= Jeffery (automobile) =

Defunct American motor vehicle manufacturer

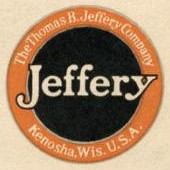
- Jeffery Logo from Brochure

Overview
- Manufacturer: Thomas B. Jeffery Company
- Also called: Jeffery Four, Jeffery Six
- Production: 1914–1917
- Assembly: United States: Kenosha, Wisconsin
- Designer: Charles T. Jeffery

Chronology
- Predecessor: 1913 Rambler Model Four
- Successor: 1917 Nash Model 671

The Jeffery brand of automobiles were manufactured by the Thomas B. Jeffery Company in Kenosha, Wisconsin.

== History ==
The company was founded by Charles T. Jeffery and Thomas B. Jeffery, and sold under the brand name Rambler between 1902 and 1913.

On the death of the founder, Thomas Jeffery in 1910, his son Charles took over the business. In 1915, Charles T. Jeffery, changed the automotive branding from Rambler to Jeffery to honor the founder, his father, Thomas B. Jeffery.

Production continued until 1917 when it was sold to Charles W. Nash, former president of General Motors, and formed the foundation of the Nash Motors Company.

Nash Motors went on to become Nash-Kelvinator Corporation, in 1954 merging with Hudson to form American Motors Corporation (AMC), finally bought out by Chrysler in 1987 and becoming the Jeep-Eagle Division of Chrysler.

== Models ==
The 1914 to 1917 Jeffery Four was a new monobloc 4-cylinder car of 40 horsepower on a 118-inch chassis. The Jeffery Six (called the Chesterfield Six in 1915) was a 48 hp six-cylinder car on a 128 inch chassis. The cars were moderately priced from $1,550 to $1,950, (equivalent to $62,060 in 2025) and came in open or closed body styles.

The Jeffery cars were available with special bodies that were manufactured by the W.S. Seaman Company. Located in Milwaukee, Wisconsin, Seaman was 50% owned by the Jeffery Company and it also supplied bodies for other automakers as well as for trucks, buses, and ambulances. One of the models was "Touring" and approximately 1,350 were made from 1914 until 1916.

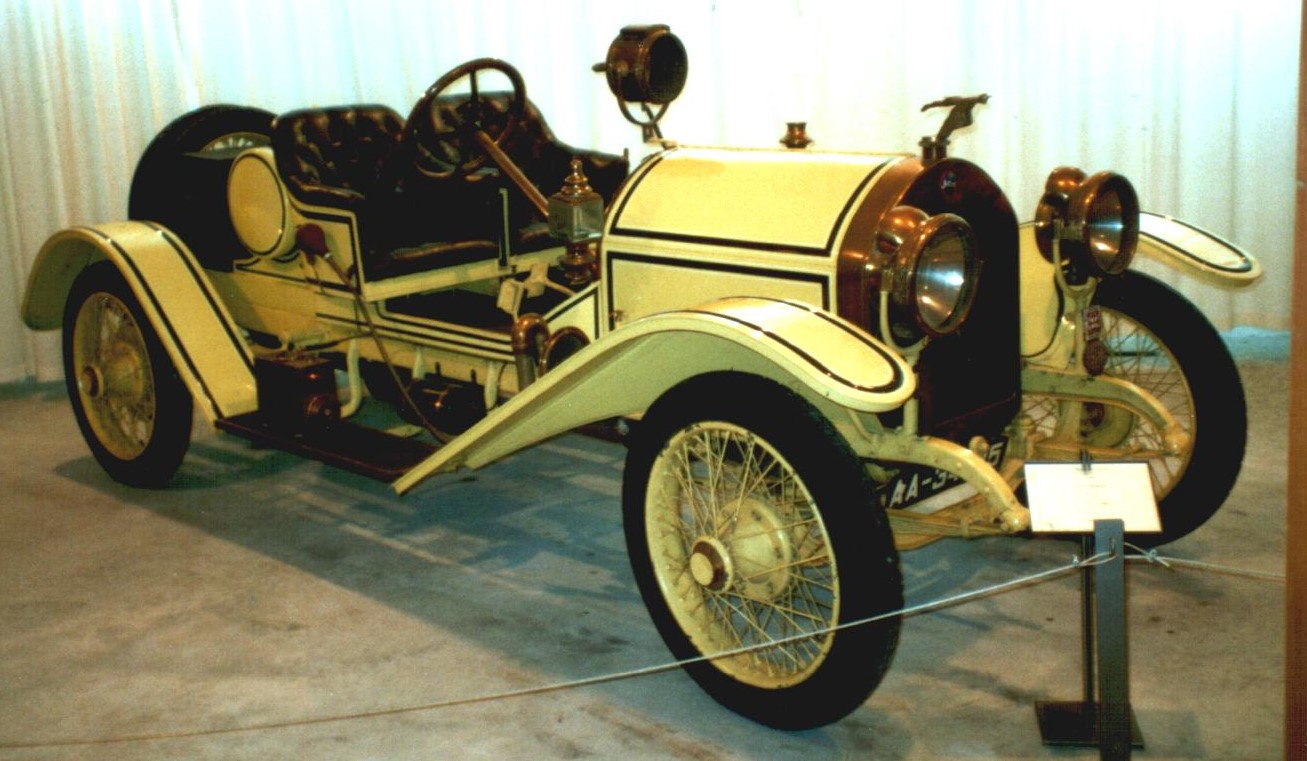
1915 Jeffery roadster

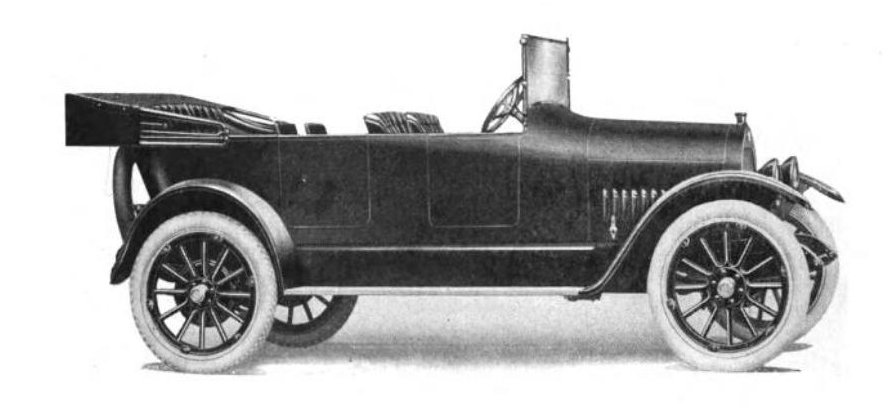
1916 Jeffery touring car

1917 Jeffery Six

== Jeffery Quad ==
Main article; Jeffery Quad

The company made four-wheel-drive trucks and Jeffery armored cars as well as supplying the chassis to other firms.
