= Nash Haul Thrift =

Series of medium-duty trucks made by Nash Motors

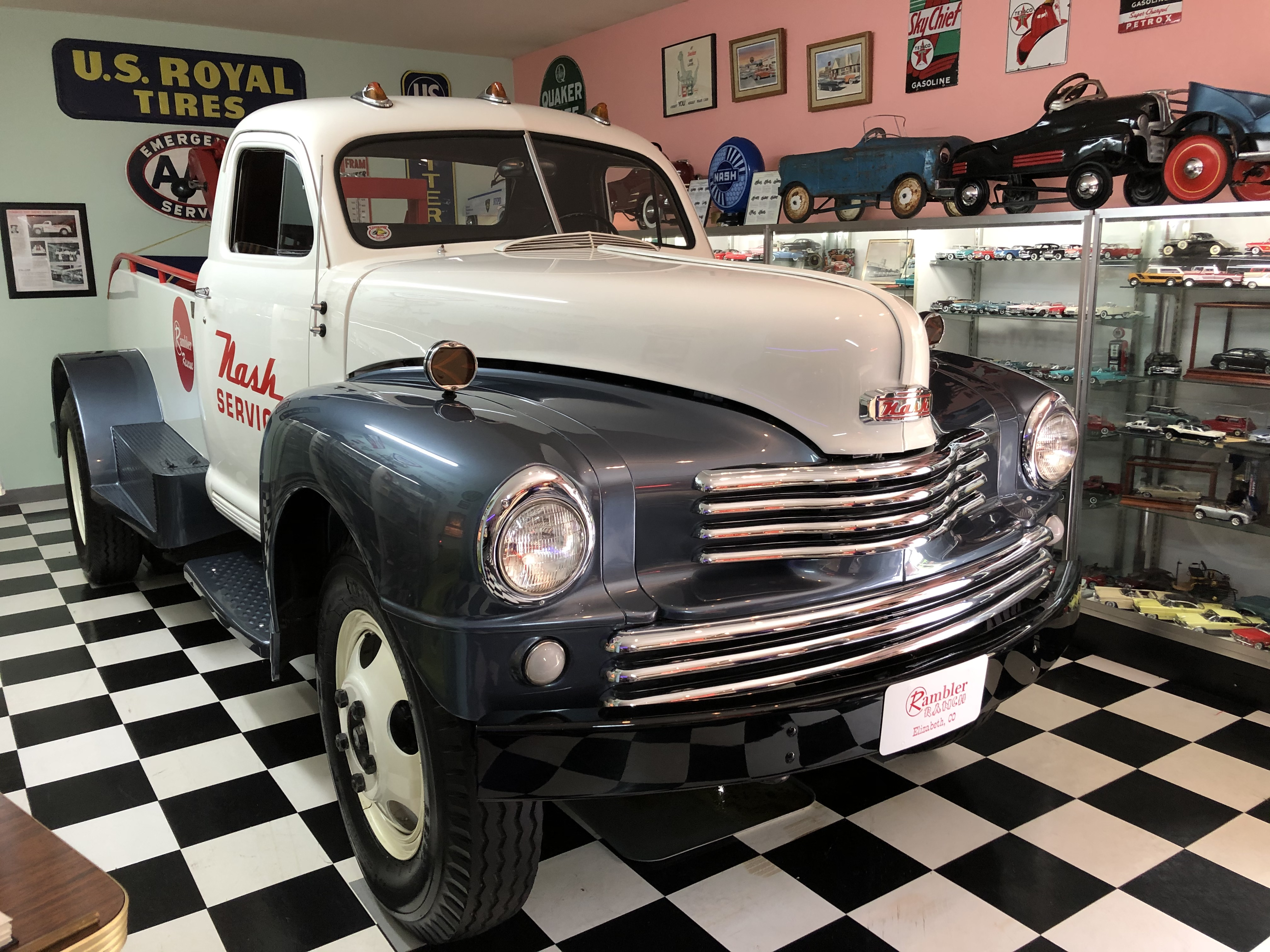
- 1948 Nash dealership tow truck

Overview
- Manufacturer: Nash Motors
- Also called: Nash 3148/3248
- Production: 1947–1954

Body and chassis
- Class: Light truck
- Layout: FR layout

Powertrain
- Engine: 234.8 cu in (3.8 L) I6

Dimensions
- Wheelbase: 3148: 133 in (3,378 mm); 3248: 157 in (3,988 mm)

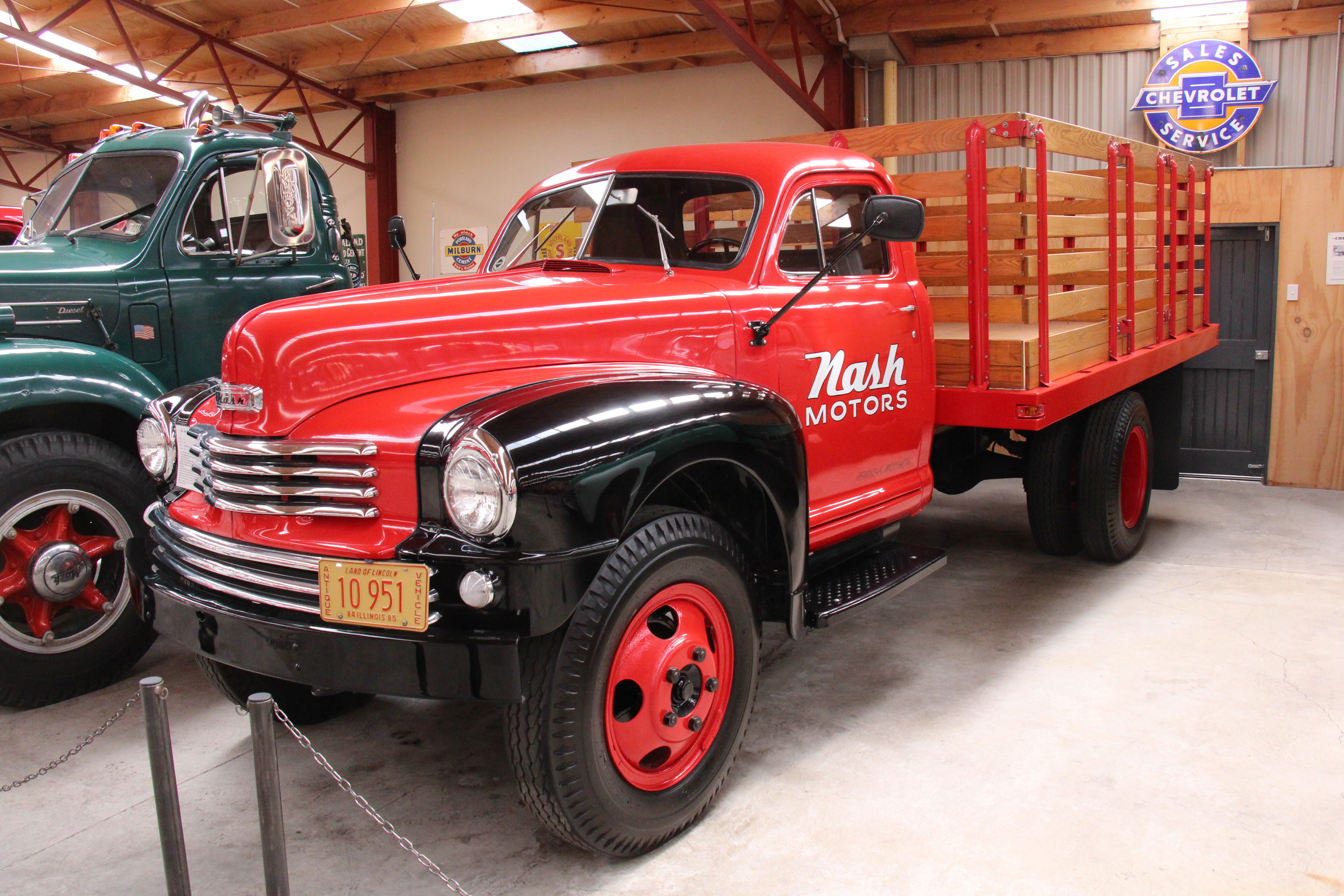
Nash Model 3148

The Nash Haul Thrift (sometimes "Haulthrift") is a series of trucks produced by Nash Motors from 1947 until 1954, mainly for export markets.

Nash dealers in the United States had the option of ordering these trucks for dealership use as tow trucks.

== Design ==
The first Nash trucks were the continuation of the Jeffery Quad, an all-wheel drive, all-wheel steered vehicle for military and civilian use. The Nash Quads were produced until 1928. After that, Nash focused on building high-quality passenger cars.

The automaker developed a line of commercial vehicles in 1947 for export markets and offered them to its domestic dealerships for strictly dealer-only use because no retail sales were allowed. These units had tow bodies supplied by Ashton Power Wrecker Equipment of Detroit, Michigan.

Most Nash trucks were shipped overseas or in completely knocked down (CKD) kit form. Local Nash affiliates assembled the vehicles, thus saving on import duties. Examples include kits shipped to Canada that were assembled by Nash Motors of Canada as well as assembly of kits at the Nash assembly plant in Mexico. Other markets included countries in South America and Europe, as well as reports of 50 exported to Tasmania.

Customers could order the Haul Thrift trucks with or without a 3/16-inch all-steel cab. They could adapt the truck's heavy-duty frame and chassis to a variety of uses including equipment for tow truck duty with a power crane, while other body options were a 12-foot (4 m) stake platform with the 157-inch chassis, a dump body with the 133-inch chassis, and straight frame or wheelhouse-type 12 ft (4 m) enclosed cargo van bodies.

Two Haul Trift models were available:

- Nash 3148: 133-inch-wheelbase chassis weight = 4,335 lb (1,966 kg), with cab = 4,820 lb (2,186 kg), Maximum Gross Vehicle Weight Rating = 14,500 lb (6,577 kg)

Nash 3148-A: with two-speed rear end, Maximum Gross Vehicle Weight Rating =16,000 lb (7,257 kg)

- Nash 3248: 157-inch-wheelbase chassis weight = 3,312 lb (1,502 kg), with cab = 4,887 lb (2,217 kg), Maximum Gross Vehicle Weight Rating = 14,500 lb (6,577 kg)

Nash 3248-A: with two-speed rear end, Maximum Gross Vehicle Weight Rating = 16,000 lb (7,257 kg)

Nash's trucks looked more luxurious than other trucks of the era and are reminiscent of the 1946 through 1948 Nash 600 passenger cars from which much of the cab's bodywork originated. The fenders were the same as the passenger car, albeit with larger openings made by a second panel stamping. The truck's grille design was more basic and did not have a lower portion that continued on the front fenders. The hood-mounted badge was also simpler than on the Nash passenger cars, and the parking lights were round rather than rectangular. The interior was also more upscale than the typical trucks of the era because it featured gauges and controls from the luxurious Nash Ambassador with its distinctive full-width engine-turned dash panel, and the trucks had "fancy" brown vinyl upholstery with a tan headliner.

The truck's engine was the same as in the Nash Ambassador series. However, the I6 was designed with a lower state of tune for truck use, producing 104 horsepower (78 kW) at 3400 rpm and 200 pound force-feet (270 N⋅m) of torque at 1500 rpm, rather than the 112 hp (84 kW) and 208 lb⋅ft (282 N⋅m) for the passenger cars. This was an advanced overhead-valve design with the intake manifold integrally cast in the cylinder head with individual ports to each combustion chamber. The Haul Thrift engines featured seven main bearing crankshaft and could operate on lower-grade gasoline due to its 7.25:1 compression ratio. These engines have been described as "potent ... rugged and seemed to last forever".<rref name="Foster"/> The clutch was an 11-inch (279 mm) Borg & Beck unit with a four-speed manual transmission with a power take-off on the right side. An optional Timken double-reduction hypoid vacuum-shift rear axle provided a total of eight forward gears. A push-pull knob on the shift lever controlled a vacuum switch for a diaphragm to move the pinion between the rear axle's two ring gears. No declutching was needed to go between the two-speed axle gears. Changing from low to high was by pulling on the knob while lifting the accelerator pedal, pausing slightly, and then pushing down on the accelerator. Shifting from high to low gearing was accomplished by pushing the knob down and quickly lifting and then pressing down on the accelerator pedal. Parking the truck with the two-speed axle should be with the rear axle in low gear.

Nash produced little over 5,000 Nash Haul Thrift trucks from 1947 through 1954. One source lists 16 were made in 1955. Approximately 300 were delivered to Nash dealers in the United States, while the automaker retained a few for use as service vehicles, parts runners, and tractor-trailer units at Nash factories.

== Nash truck prototypes ==
The Haul Thrift line was the only trucks that Nash produced and marketed after World War II. The company developed a prototype pickup truck in 1942, but meeting the demand for automobiles was a higher priority. Between 1946 and 1949, several prototypes or styling exercises of light-duty pickup trucks were built, but Nash's unibody design made it difficult for such designs to reach production.

== Survivors ==
After Nash merged with Hudson to form American Motors Corporation in 1954, documentation about the trucks was lost. The Nash Car Club has about 30 of these Nash trucks registered among its members as of 2010. Some of these original Nash dealer tow trucks were converted to flatbed stake bodies.
