= Stoke, Plymouth =

Suburb of Plymouth, Devon

Coordinates: 50.377°N 4.161°W

Stoke
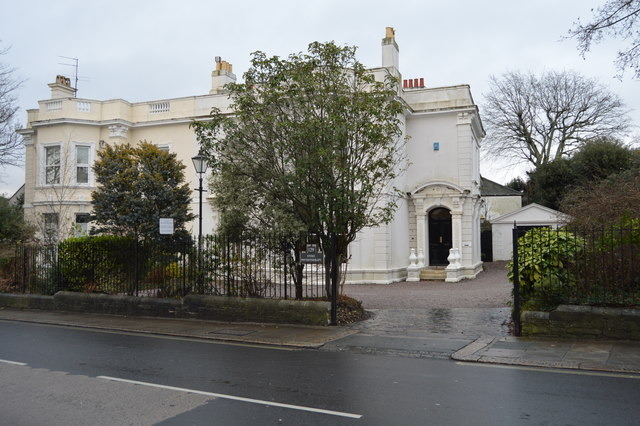
- Stoke Physiotherapist

- Location within Devon
- Population: 13,861 (2011)
- OS grid reference: SX465552
- Unitary authority: Plymouth
- Ceremonial county: Devon
- Region: South West
- Country: England
- Sovereign state: United Kingdom
- Post town: PLYMOUTH
- Postcode district: PL3 4xx
- Dialling code: 01752
- Police: Devon and Cornwall
- Fire: Devon and Somerset
- Ambulance: South Western
- UK Parliament: Plymouth Sutton and Devonport

Stoke, also referred to by its earlier name of Stoke Damerel, is an inner suburb of the city of Plymouth, in the ceremonial county of Devon, England.

In 1844, Stoke Damerel was described as a parish in Roborough hundred, adjoining the borough of Plymouth, and including Devonport within it. In 1914, Devonport and Plymouth amalgamated with Stonehouse, and the new town took the name of Plymouth.

Stoke is now densely built up with family houses and bisected by the main railway line from Paddington to Penzance. The parish church is notable not only for its evolving architecture, but also its contents and historical connections. The area has been prosperous for several hundred years, and there are distinguished private houses dating to Georgian and Victorian times, several of which feature in Nikolaus Pevsner's South Devon.

Stoke Damerel Primary School educates approximately 320 pupils of ages 4–11.

Devonport High School for Boys on Paradise Road draws pupils from all over the city and parts of south-west Devon and south-east Cornwall.

== Notable people ==
- George Bentham (1800–1884), botanist, sometimes called "the premier systematic botanist of the nineteenth century"
- Mary Fergusson (1914–1997), British engineer, and the first female fellow of the Institution of Civil Engineers
- Captain Tobias Furneaux (1735–1781), a Royal Navy officer and the first man to circumnavigate the globe in both directions
- Rev John Hawker
- John Scott, Robert Falcon Scott's father
- Thomas B. Jeffery, inventor, bicycle and vehicle manufacturer. Founder of the brand name "Rambler", see Rambler bicycles and Rambler cars.
