= Thomas B. Jeffery Company =

American automobile company (1902-1917)

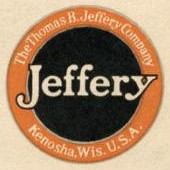
- Industry: Automotive
- Predecessor: Gormully & Jeffery Manufacturing Company
- Founded: 1902
- Fate: Renamed Nash Motors in 1917
- Headquarters: Kenosha, Wisconsin, U.S.
- Key people: Thomas B. Jeffery; Charles T. Jeffery; Charles W. Nash
- Products: Automobiles; Trucks; Military vehicles

The Thomas B. Jeffery Company was an American automobile manufacturer in Kenosha, Wisconsin, from 1902 until 1916. The company manufactured the Rambler and Jeffery brand motorcars. The Gormully & Jeffery Manufacturing Company, a bicycle manufacturer, preceded it. It was the company that formed Nash Motors, and thus one of the automakers that merged to become American Motors Corporation (AMC), later part of Chrysler, and subsequently Stellantis.

== Thomas B. Jeffery ==
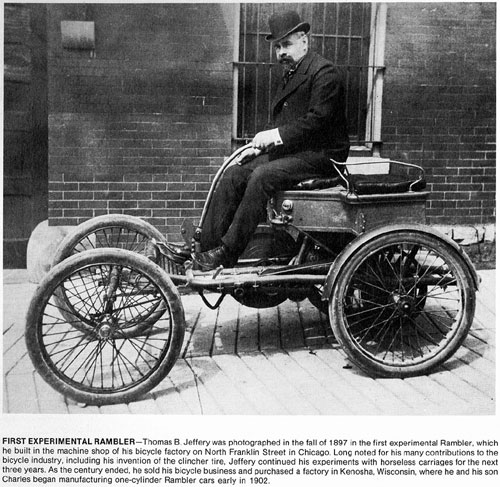
Thomas B. Jeffery and his 1897 Rambler prototype

Thomas B. Jeffery was an inventor and an industrialist. He was one of America's first entrepreneurs interested in automobiles in the late 19th century. In 1897, he built his first prototype motorcar. Thomas B. Jeffery was serious enough about automobiles to sell his stake in Gormully & Jeffery to the American Bicycle Company to finance his new car company.

== Business ==
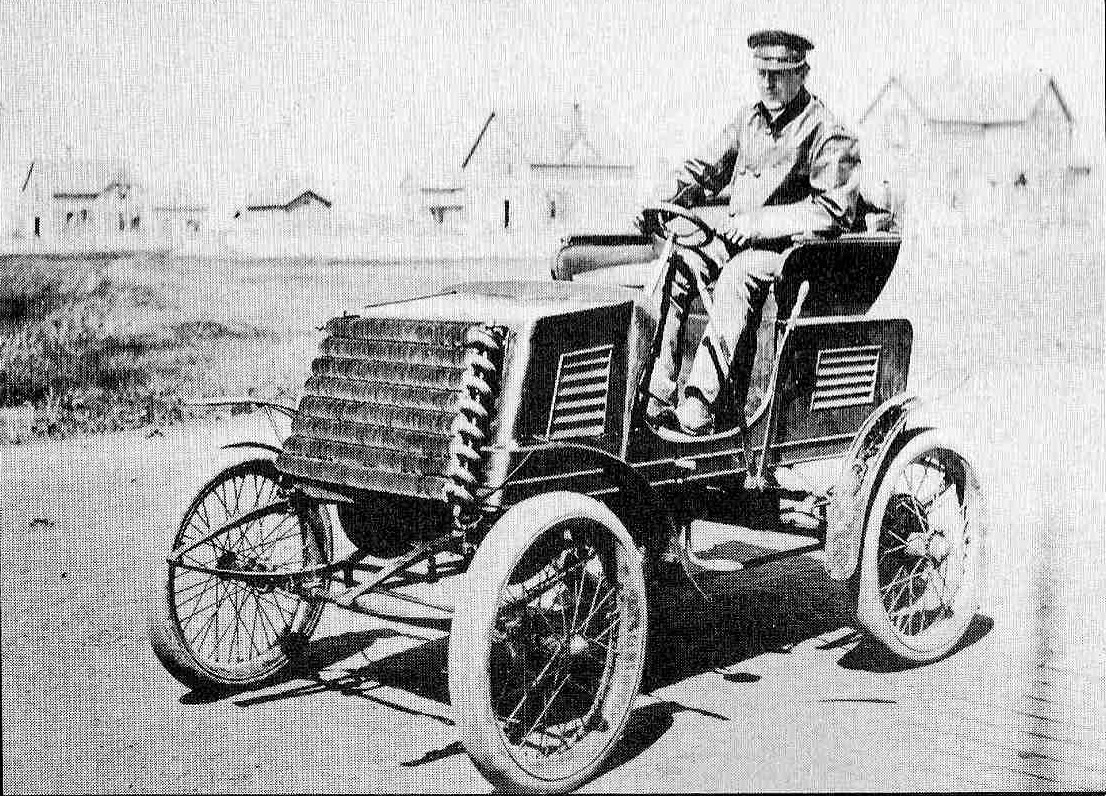
Charles T. Jeffery driving a 1901 Rambler Model A

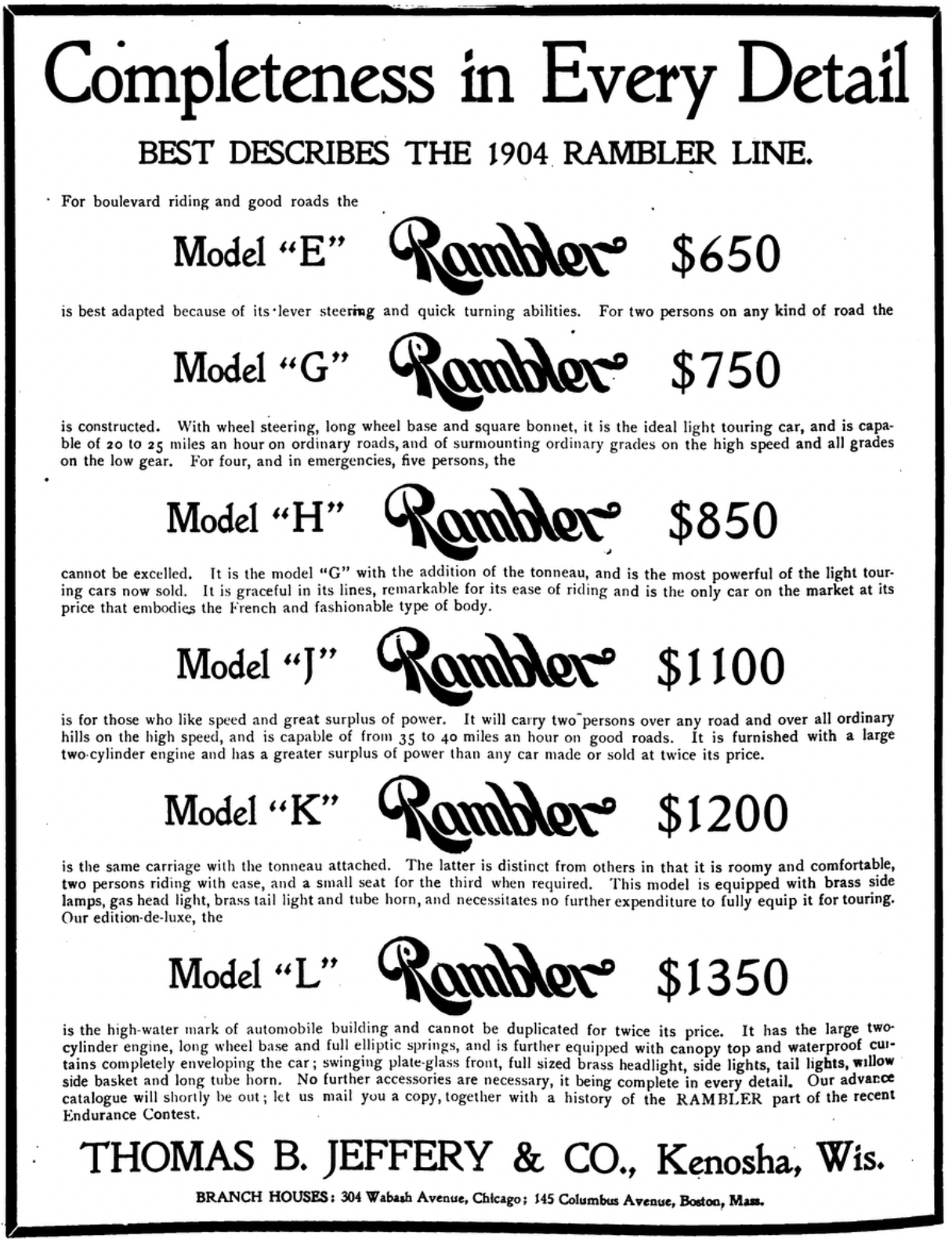
Rambler Model E,G,H,J,K,L (1904)

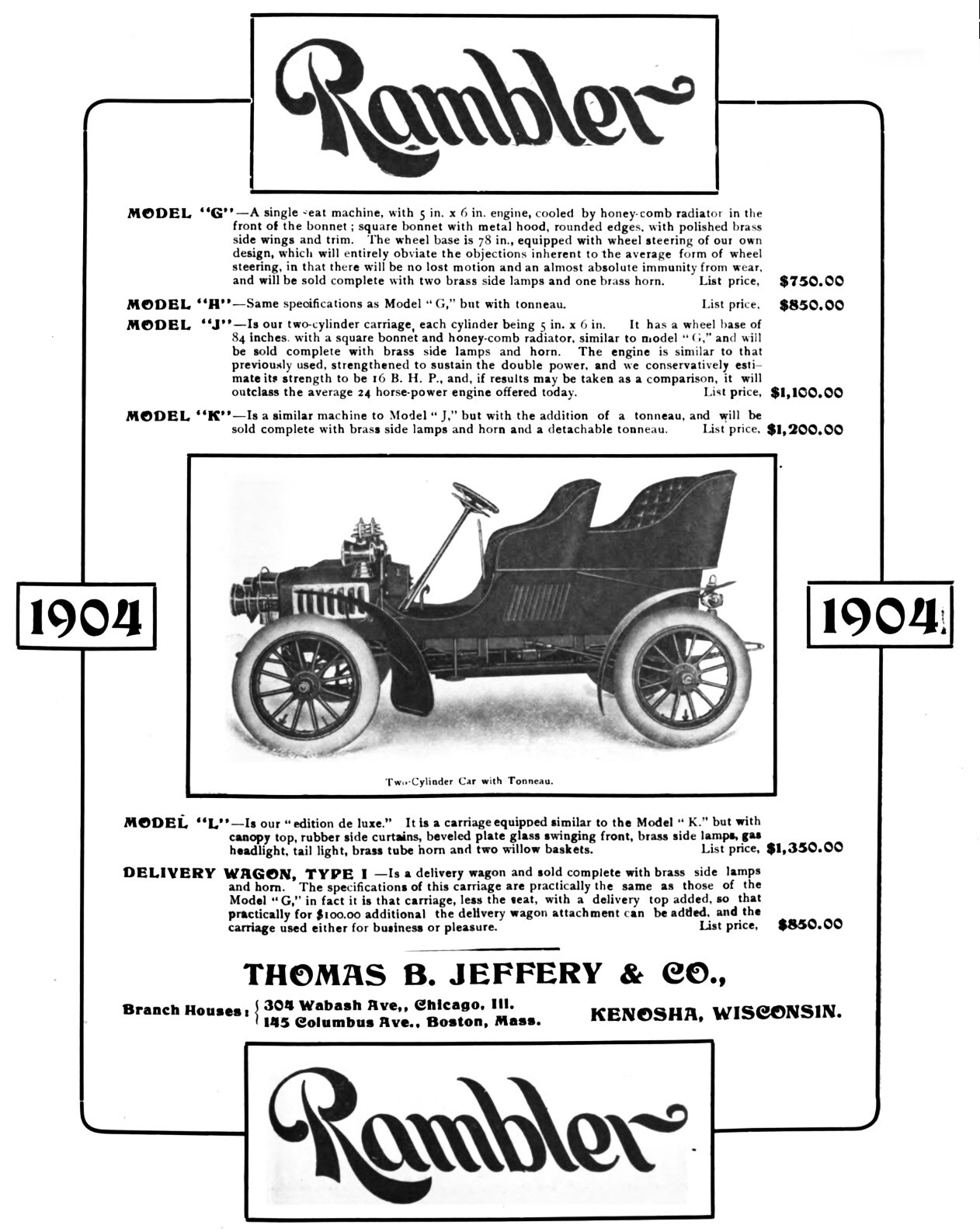
Rambler Model G,H,J,K,L,I (1904)

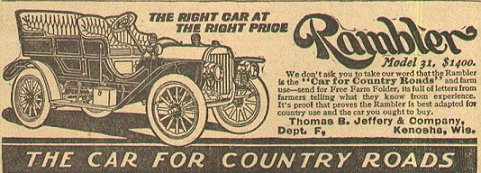
1908 Rambler advertisement

Charles T. Jeffery's (Thomas' son) experimental prototypes of 1901 (Models A and B) used at least two radical innovations – steering wheels and front-mounted engines. By the time Charles was ready for production in 1902, his father had talked him out of these wild dreams and convinced him to stick with tillers and engines under the seat.

From 1902 until 1908, Jeffery moved steadily to bigger, more reliable models, starting with the 1902 Model C. Jeffery cars were built on assembly lines (the second manufacturer to adopt them, Olds Motor Works was first), and in 1903, Jeffery sold 1,350 Ramblers. By 1905, Jeffery had more than doubled this number. One reason may have been that Charles went back to the steering wheel before 1904. In 1907, Jeffery was building a large variety of different body styles and sizes. Among them was a five-passenger, US$2,500 Rambler weighing 2,600 pounds (1,179 kilograms) and powered by a 250 horsepower (186 kilowatts) engine.

In April 1910, Thomas B. Jeffery died in Pompeii, Italy. In June of that year, the business was incorporated as the Thomas B. Jeffery Company, with Charles T. Jeffery as president and general manager, and H.W. Jeffery as vice president and treasurer.

In 1915, Charles T. Jeffery changed the automotive brand from Rambler to Jeffery to honor his father, Thomas B. Jeffery.

In 1916, G.H. Eddy replaced H.W. Jeffery as treasurer, allowing Jeffery to focus on the vice presidency. G.W. Greiner was the secretary, L.H. Bill the general manager, J.W. DeCou the factory manager, and Al Recke the sales manager.

Charles T. Jeffery survived the sinking of the RMS Lusitania (a British luxury liner torpedoed by the Germans in World War I) in 1915. He thus decided to spend the rest of his life more enjoyably.

Charles W. Nash was caught in a power struggle for leadership at General Motors (GM) after successfully refocusing the automaker's management and production as well as increasing its sales and profits. Although William C. Durant offered Nash an annual salary of $1 million to continue working for GM, Nash saw an opportunity to exercise complete control over a company and purchased the Thomas B. Jeffery Company in August 1916. In 1917, Nash renamed the company Nash Motors.

== The factory ==
Jeffery factory building

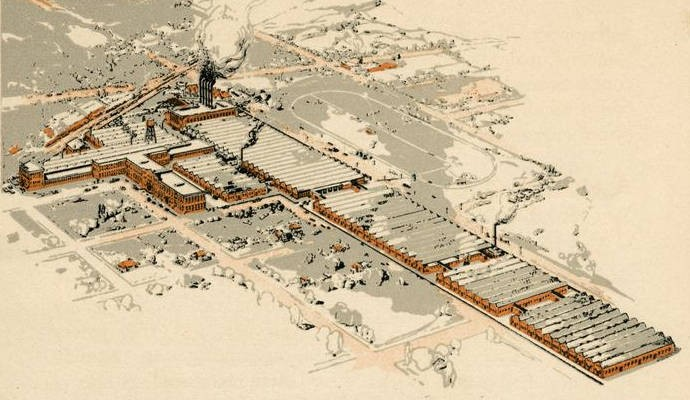
The sprawling Jeffery works circa 1915

Thomas B. Jeffery, with the money from his sale of Gormully & Jeffery, bought the old Sterling Bicycle Company's factory in Kenosha, Wisconsin. The original factory building was only 600 by 100 feet (183 m × 30 m) in size.

By 1916, the company's buildings expanded to cover over 20 acres (8 ha) under roof and all of its facilities had grown to over 100 acres (40 ha) that included a test track.

Automotive production would continue on the original sites under a number of succeeding companies. The last facility in Kenosha, known as Kenosha Engine, was finally closed by Chrysler in 2010.

== Jeffery Quad ==
The Jeffery Quad, also known as the Nash Quad or Quad, is a four-wheel drive truck that was developed and built in Kenosha from 1913, and after 1916, by Nash Motors, as well as under license by other truck makers. The Quad introduced numerous engineering innovations. Its design and durability proved effective in traversing the muddy, rough, and unpaved roads of the times.

The Quad also became one of the most effective work vehicles in World War I.

The Quad was also one of the first successful four-wheel drive vehicles ever to be made, and its production continued unchanged through 1928, or 15 years, with a total of 41,674 units made.

== Timeline ==
Jeffery company employees

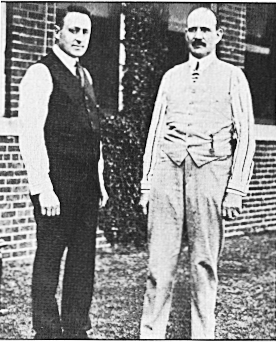
Charles T. Jeffery (left) Charles W. Nash (right)

1897 – Thomas B. Jeffery builds a rear-engine prototype motorcar using the Rambler name previously used on a highly successful line of bicycles made by Gormully & Jeffery.

1899 – Positive reviews at the 1899 Chicago International Exhibition & Tournament and the first National Automobile Show in New York City prompt the Jefferys to enter the automobile business.

1900 (Dec 6) – Thomas B. Jeffery finalizes a US$65,000 deal to buy the Kenosha, Wisconsin, factory of the defunct Sterling Bicycle with money from the sale of his interest in Gormully & Jeffery.

1901 – Two more prototypes, Models A and B, are made.

1902 – First production Ramblers – the US$750 Model C open runabout and the $850 Model D (the same car with a folding top). Both are powered by an 8-horsepower (6 kW; 8 PS), 98-cubic-inch (1.6 L) one-cylinder engine mounted beneath the seat, and are steered by a right-side tiller. First-year production totals 1,500 units making Jeffery the second-largest car maker behind Olds Motor Works.

1910 (Mar 21) – Thomas B. Jeffery dies while on vacation in Italy.

1910 (Jun 10) – Charles T. Jeffery incorporates the firm as a $3 million (US$103,660,714 in 2025 dollars) public stock company.

1914 – The Rambler name is replaced with the Jeffery moniker in honor of the company's founder, Thomas B. Jeffery.

1916 (Aug) – Charles T. Jeffery sells the company to former GM president Charles W. Nash.

1917 – Charles W. Nash renames the company Nash Motors after himself.
