= Gormully & Jeffery =

American bicycle company

- Founded: 1879
- Founder: Thomas B. Jeffery; R. Philip Gormully
- Defunct: 1900
- Fate: Sold to American Bicycle Company

Gormully & Jeffery (G&J) was an American bicycle company, founded in Chicago in 1879 by Thomas B. Jeffery and R. Philip Gormully.

== History ==
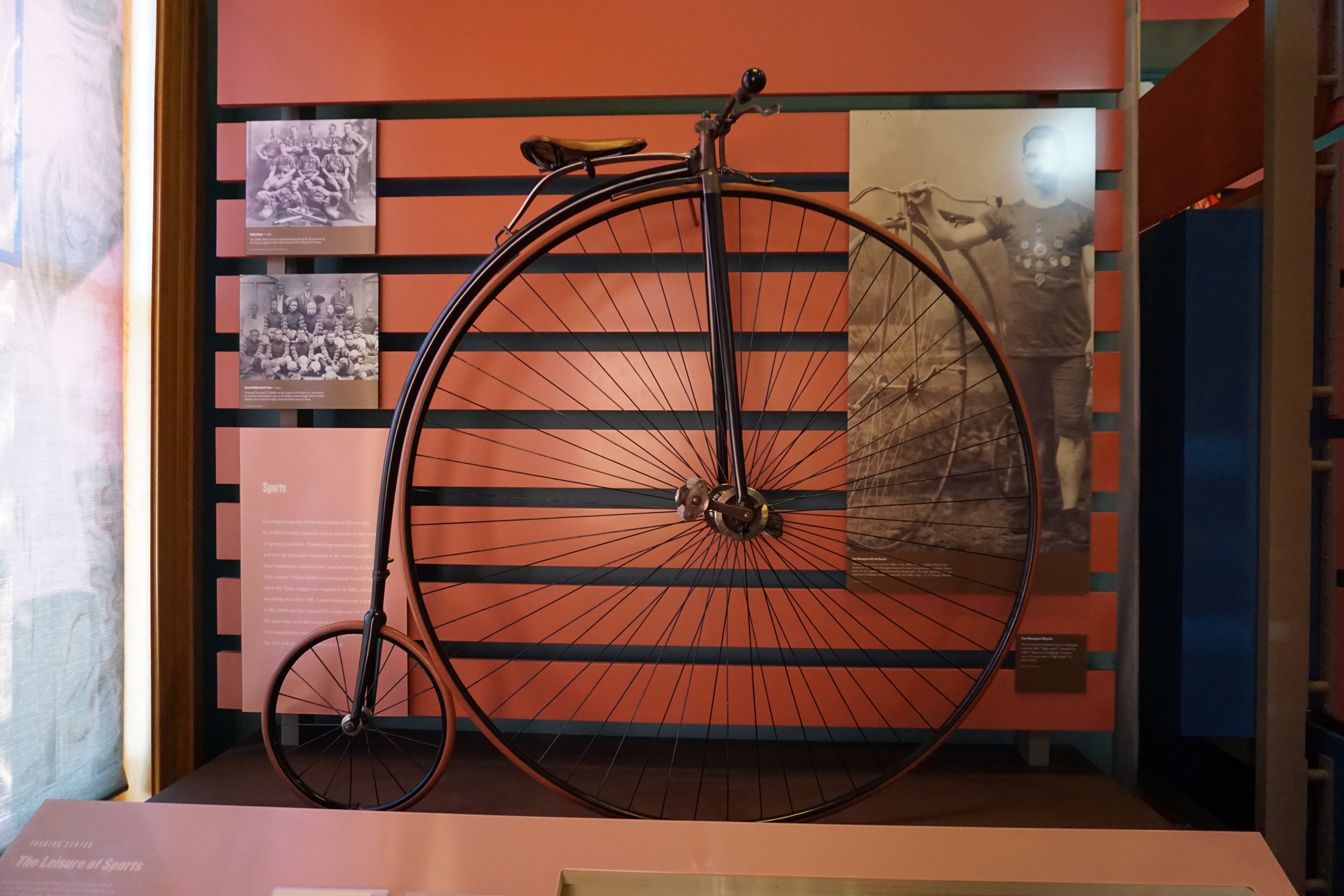
An 1887 Gormully & Jeffery American Challenge bicycle at the Old Red Museum

Gormully & Jeffery started with the production of children's bicycles in 1879. They were the second bicycle manufacturer established in the United States, and the first in the Western US.

G&J played an important role in opening up the industry for bicycles in the United States. They fought the original license-holder for the production of bicycles and eventually won the process in the US Supreme Court.

The company was sold to the American Bicycle Company, led by Pope and Spaulding, in 1900 so that Jeffery could focus on manufacturing the Rambler automobile under the new Thomas B. Jeffery Company.

== Company ==
Gormully served as the company's president and treasurer, while Jeffery served as secretary and superintendent.

The main workshop of Gormully & Jeffery Manufacturing Company was located on North Franklin and Pearson streets in Chicago, where they produced high-quality bicycles. The company also had a retail salesroom at 85 Madison street. Over time, the company expanded its operations and developed branches in New York, Boston, and Washington, D.C.

== Products ==
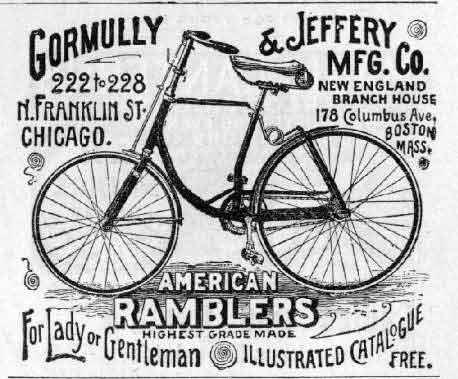
Newspaper ad for a "Rambler" by Gormully & Jeffery Manufacturing Company (1891)

From 1887 to 1900, Gormully & Jeffery marketed their products under the Rambler brand. They used a variety of new techniques, improving the quality of their bikes.

Under the Rambler brand, Gormully & Jeffery marketed a range of bicycles with various designs and features. The company was known for its innovative techniques, they were one of the first companies to introduce chain-driven bicycles, which improved the efficiency and speed of bicycles.

In addition to chain-driven bicycles, Gormully & Jeffery also developed bicycles with unique designs and features, such as the Rambler bicycle, which had a curved top tube that allowed riders to mount and dismount the bicycle more easily. The Rambler brand became popular among cycling enthusiasts for its innovative designs and high-quality construction.

=== Models ===
Under the Rambler brand, Gormully & Jeffery marketed a range of bicycles models with various designs and features. The company was known for its innovative models and were one of the first companies to introduce chain-driven bicycles, which improved the efficiency and speed of bicycles.

In addition to chain-driven models, Gormully & Jeffery also developed bicycle models with unique designs and features, such as the Rambler bicycle, which had a curved top tube that allowed riders to mount and dismount the bicycle more easily. The Rambler brand became popular among cycling enthusiasts for its innovative designs and high-quality construction.

== Literature ==
- Kenosha's Jeffery & Rambler Automobiles, Patrick Foster, Arcadia Publishing, 2018
- The History of AMC Motorsports: Trans-Am, Drag, NASCAR, Land Speed and Off-Road Racing. Bob McClurg, 2016, p. 11
- Peddling Bicycles to America: The Rise of an Industry, Bruce D. Epperson, McFarland & Company, 2014
