= Annie Londonderry =

American cyclist and world traveler (1870–1947)

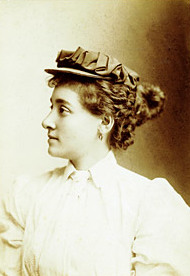
- Annie Londonderry as a young woman
- Born: Annie Cohen; 1870; Latvia
- Died: November 11, 1947 (aged 76–77); New York
- Other names: Annie Cohen Kopchovsky, Nelly Bly Jr.
- Occupation: Businesswoman
- Notable work: Circumnavigated the globe on a bicycle

Annie Cohen Kopchovsky (1870 – 11 November 1947), known as Annie Londonderry, was a Latvian immigrant to the United States who in 1894–95 became the first woman to bicycle around the world. After having completed her travel, albeit mostly by ship, she built a media career around engagement with the popular conception of what it was to be female.

== Early life and marriage ==
Annie Cohen was born in Latvia to Levi (Leib) and Beatrice (Basha) Cohen. She had two older siblings, Sarah and Bennett. Her family moved to the United States in 1875 and she became a citizen as a child, only four or five years old.

They settled in Boston, Massachusetts, and lived in a tenement on Spring Street, in the West End. On January 17, 1887, her father died, and her mother died two months later. Her older sister Sarah was already married and living in Maine, leaving Annie (age 17) and her brother Bennett (age 20) to take care of their younger siblings Jacob and Rosa (ages 10 and 8 or 9 at the time, respectively). Annie and Bennett both soon married, and brought their spouses to share their Spring Street home.

In 1888 Annie Cohen married Simon "Max" Kopchovsky, a peddler. They had three children in the next four years: Bertha Malkie (Mollie), Libbie, and Simon. Her brother Bennett married Bertha, and they had two children. Her brother Jacob died of a lung infection at age 17. Max, a devout Orthodox Jew, attended synagogue and studied the Torah, while Annie sold advertising space for several daily Boston newspapers.

== Trip around the world ==
=== The wager ===
The inspiration for betting (or falsely claiming there was a bet) on a bicycle journey around the world likely came from a former Harvard student E. C. Pfeiffer. Under the pseudonym Paul Jones, he started bicycling in mid-February 1894 claiming to be attempting a trip around the world in one year on a $5,000 wager. Two weeks later, the bet was revealed to be fake. Later in 1894, two rich Boston men allegedly wagered $20,000 against $10,000 that no woman could travel around the world by bicycle in 15 months and earn $5000. It is doubtful there was ever a wager. The alleged bettors were never named.

Annie Londonderry's great-grand nephew and author of the authoritative history of her journey, Peter Zheutlin, has stated that "It's virtually certain, for example, that she concocted the wager story to sensationalise her trip". If Annie's gambit was a stunt, one person stood to benefit: Colonel Albert Pope, the owner of Pope Manufacturing Company of Boston and Hartford, which produced, among many other things, Columbia bicycles. His senior salesman at Columbia's main store in Boston delivered one of their models for the start of the journey. The choice of a woman was an obvious extension of previous exploits. In 1887 Thomas Stevens had become the first person to bicycle around the world. Moreover, the bicycle craze of the 1890s was providing women with an independent method of transportation and fomenting an evolution in women's clothing, from full skirts and heavy material to bloomers that allow for more mobility and freedom of movement.

Annie Kopchovsky was a highly unlikely choice for the completion of this wager, starting with her name, which identified her as a Jew in a city and country where anti-Semitism was widespread. She lacked the experience, never having ridden a bicycle until a few days before her trip, and had a slight build, only 5 foot 3, about 100 pounds. In addition, she was a married woman and a mother of three children, ages five, three, and two.

Sponsorships were crucial to financing the enterprise and the publicity surrounding it. Her 42-pound Columbia women's bike carried a placard attached to the rear wheel that advertised New Hampshire's Londonderry Lithia Spring Water Company, for which the company paid her $100 and she in turn agreed to go by the name "Annie Londonderry" for the duration of her trip.

=== Setting out ===
On June 27, 1894, at about 11 o'clock in the morning, Londonderry set off from the Massachusetts State House on Beacon Hill. The 24-year-old wore a long skirt, corset and high collar and carried with her a change of clothes and a pearl-handled pistol. On her route to Chicago, she chose cycling routes published in tour books by the League of American Wheelmen. These tour books contained distances, road conditions, landmarks, places to eat, and hotels that offered cyclist discounts, and provided company as many other cyclists rode the same routes. With good weather and roads, she was able to average between eight and ten miles per day.

When she arrived in Chicago on September 24, she had lost 20 pounds and the desire to continue. Winter was coming, and she realized she could not make it across the mountains to San Francisco before snow started to fall. Prior to leaving Chicago to ride home to Boston, she met with Sterling Cycle Works, whose offices and factory were located on Carroll Avenue.

=== Europe and Asia ===
With the change in dress and bicycle, Londonderry was determined to complete her world trip, even though she only had eleven months to make it back to Chicago. She followed her route back to New York City, and on November 24, 1894, she boarded the French liner La Touraine, destined for Le Havre on France's north coast. She arrived on December 3 and became wrapped up in bureaucracy. Her bike was confiscated by custom officials, her money was taken, and the French press wrote insulting articles about her appearance. She managed to free herself and rode from Paris to Marseille. Despite being held up by bad weather, she arrived in two weeks by cycling and train with one foot bandaged and propped up on her handlebars due to an injury on the road.

Londonderry left Marseille on the 413-foot steamship Sydney with only eight months to get back to Chicago. The wager did not dictate a minimum cycling distance, so she sailed from place to place, completing day-trips at each stop along the way. She visited many places, including Alexandria, Colombo, Singapore, Saigon, Hong Kong, Shanghai, Nagasaki and Kobe.

=== Return to the United States ===
On March 9, 1895, Londonderry sailed from Yokohama, Japan, and reached the Golden Gate in San Francisco on March 23. At one point, she and another cyclist were almost killed by a runaway horse and wagon. They received minor injuries, yet she claimed that she had been knocked out and taken to a hospital in Stockton where she coughed up blood for two days. In fact, she had given a lecture in Mozart Hall in Stockton the evening after the accident. She rode to Los Angeles, through Arizona and New Mexico and on to El Paso.

The Southern Pacific Railway tracks offered many benefits to cyclists traveling across southern California and Arizona, and Londonderry took advantage of them. Riders could follow service roads made of hard packed dirt and stop at shelters for train crews, where they could get a meal and a bath. Some presume she rode the train across parts of the desert, though she claims to have declined rides from passing train crews. From El Paso, she traveled north, leaving Albuquerque on July 20, 1895, bound for Denver, where she arrived on August 12. She rode the train across most of Nebraska because of the muddy roads. Near Gladbrook, Iowa, she broke her wrist when she crashed into a group of pigs and was forced to wear a cast for the remainder of her trip.

On September 12, 1895, Londonderry arrived in Chicago, accompanied by two cyclists she had met in Clinton, Iowa, and collected her $10,000 prize. She had made it around the world fourteen days under allowed time. She was back home in Boston on September 24, arriving fifteen months after she had left. When she published an account of her exploits in the New York World on October 20, 1895, the newspaper headline described it as "the Most Extraordinary Journey Ever Undertaken by a Woman". Despite criticism that she traveled more "with" a bicycle than on one, she proved a formidable cyclist at impromptu local races en route across America.

== Entrepreneurship ==
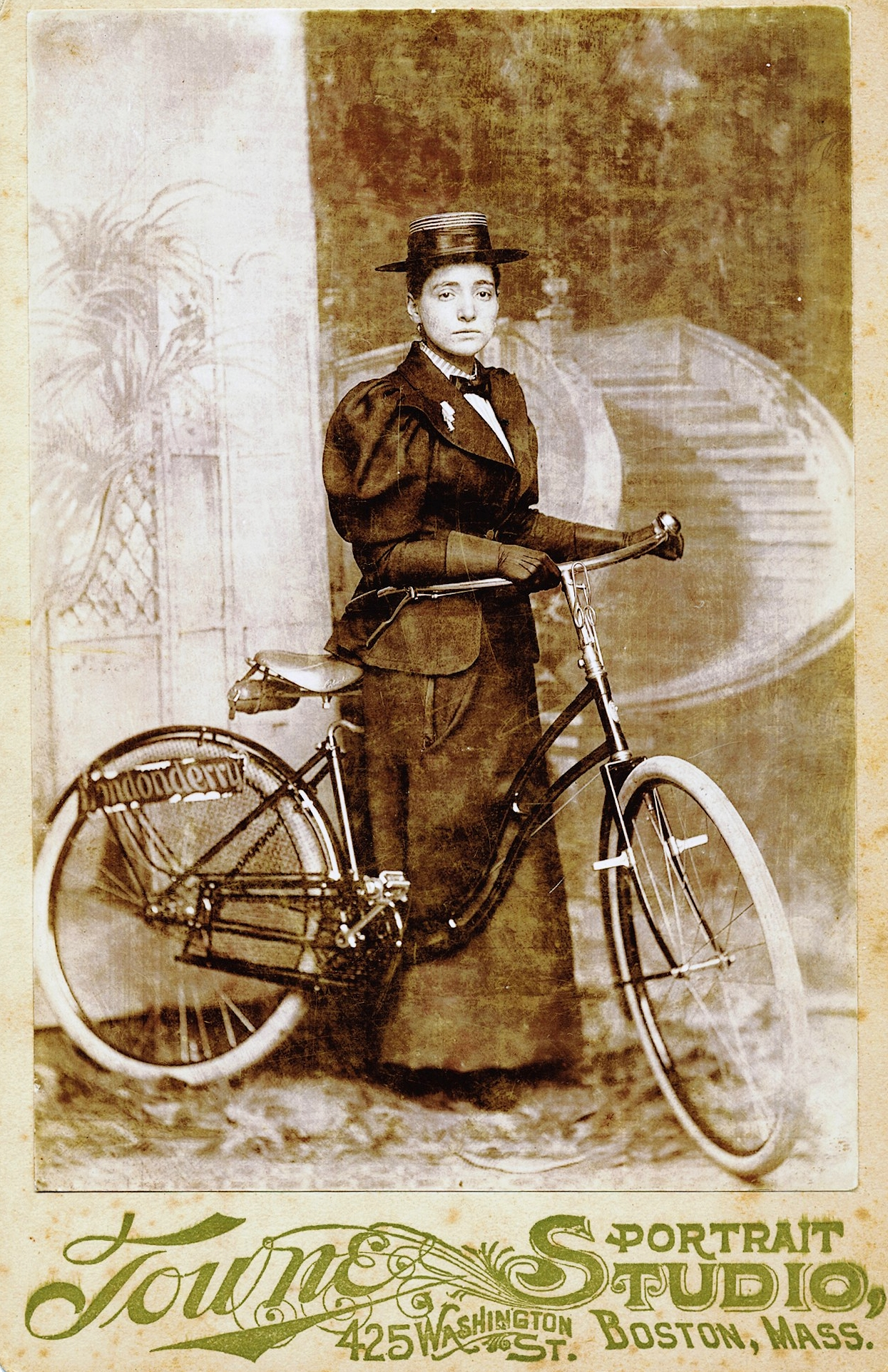
Londonderry with her branded placard

As a saleswoman and storyteller, Londonderry raised all of the money and attracted the media attention necessary for her trip. Her main income was from selling advertising space on her bike and person, hanging ribbons and signs for products ranging from bicycle tires to perfume. Her first sponsor was the Londonderry Lithia Spring Water Company of New Hampshire, which paid her $100 to carry a placard on her bike with its company name and to use the name "Annie Londonderry" throughout her trip. In Chicago, she received sponsorship from Sterling Cycle Company for promotion of its products when she swapped her bulky Columbia for the faster and lighter Sterling Roadster.

During her travels, she gave lectures about her adventures, often exaggerating her exploits. These enthralled the media and boosted her popularity. For instance, in France she described herself as an orphan, wealthy heiress, a Harvard medical student, the inventor of a new method of stenography, and the niece of a U.S. senator. While in the United States, she told stories about hunting tigers in India with German royalty and getting sent to a Japanese prison with a bullet wound. She also gave cycling demonstrations and sold promotional photos of herself, souvenir pins, and autographs.

After the trip, she accepted an offer to write about her adventures as the "New Woman" and moved her family to Bronx, New York City, where Joseph Pulitzer’s newspaper, The World, hired her to write, as "Nellie Bly, Jr." An article began "I am a journalist and a 'new woman,' if that term means that I believe I can do anything that any man can do."

After reuniting with her husband, Annie became pregnant and her brief stint as a reporter ended.

She had a child in 1897. She left again, living in northern California. She returned, living with her husband in the Bronx, New York, operating a clothing business. In the 1920s, the business was burned and, Kopchovsky used the insurance money to start Grace Strap & Novelty in Manhattan, "with a man named Feldman she met at a Horn & Hardart restaurant."

== Death ==
Kopchovsky died of a stroke on November 11, 1947, at the age of 77.

== Legacy ==
In 2007 Peter Zheutlin, her great-nephew, published Around the World on Two Wheels: Annie Londonderry's Extraordinary Ride.

In 2011, Evalyn Parry premiered SPIN, her bicycle-themed performance piece that includes a song about Londonderry ("The Ballad of Annie Londonderry"), and presented it on tour in Canada and the US.

In 2013, Gillian Klempner Willman of Spokeswoman Productions wrote, directed and produced a 26-minute documentary film titled The New Woman - Annie "Londonderry" Kopchovsky. It premiered in February 2013 at the DC Independent Film Festival, where it won the award for Best Documentary.

In November 2019, Londonderry was featured in an obituary in The New York Times, as part of their "Overlooked" series.

In August 2022, RIDE, a new musical based on Annie Londonderry's cycle by Freya Catrin Smith and Jack Williams, starring Liv Andrusier and Yuki Sutton, debuted at the Charing Cross Theatre. The musical returned in 2023, playing at the Curve Theatre, Leicester and the Southwark Playhouse with Liv Andrusier returning as Annie and Katy Ellis. In April 2024, the musical made its U.S. premiere at the Old Globe Theatre in San Diego, California.

== Timeline of the trip ==
Her trip proceeded according to this timeline: [No dates specified for cities except for those given below]

- June 25, 1894 - Boston, Massachusetts
  - Providence, Rhode Island
  - New York City, New York
  - Albany, New York
  - Syracuse, New York
  - Rochester, New York
  - Buffalo, New York
  - Cleveland, Ohio
- September 24, 1894 - Chicago, Illinois
  - Same route back to New York City

November 24, 1894 - New York City, New York

- December 3, 1894 - Le Havre, France
  - Paris, France
  - Lyon and Valence, France
  - Marseille, France
  - Alexandria and Port Said, Egypt
  - Jerusalem
  - Aden, Yemen
  - Colombo, Sri Lanka
  - Singapore
  - Saigon, Vietnam
  - Hong Kong and Port Arthur, China
  - Korea to Vladivostok, Russia (unconfirmed)
- March 9, 1895 - Nagasaki and Yokohama, Japan
- March 23, 1895 - San Francisco, California

Mark Johnson, a cyclist from the San Francisco Olympic Club accompanied her to Los Angeles, taking five weeks to ride the 650km.

- 12 April 1895 — Stockton, California
- 19 April 1895 —San Jose, California
  - San Luis Obispo, California
- 2 May 1895 — Paso Robles, California
- 15 May 1895 — Santa Barbara, California
  - Los Angeles, California
  - San Bernardino, California
  - Riverside, California
  - Indio, California
  - Yuma, Arizona
  - Phoenix, Arizona
  - Tucson, Arizona
  - Deming, New Mexico
  - El Paso, Texas
  - Albuquerque, New Mexico
  - Santa Fe, New Mexico
  - Las Vegas, New Mexico
  - Raton, New Mexico
  - Raton Pass
  - Trinidad, Colorado
  - La Junta, Colorado
  - Colorado Springs, Colorado
- August 12, 1895 - Denver, Colorado
  - Cheyenne, Wyoming
  - Train through Nebraska
  - Fremont, Nebraska
  - Omaha, Nebraska
  - Missouri Valley, Iowa
  - Ames, Iowa
  - Tama, Iowa
  - Cedar Rapids, Iowa
  - Clinton, Iowa
  - Rochelle, Illinois
- September 12, 1895 - Chicago, Illinois
- September 24, 1895 - Boston, Massachusetts

== See also ==
- Around the world cycling record and Cycling records
- Bicycling and feminism
- Elizabeth Robins Pennell, who wrote of her cycling tours around Europe in the 1880s
- Fanny Bullock Workman, who toured by bicycle in Europe, Algeria and India in the 1890s
- Frances Willard (suffragist)
- Laura Dekker
- Nellie Bly
- Thomas Stevens (cyclist)
