= Charles T. Jeffery =

American businessman (1876–1935)

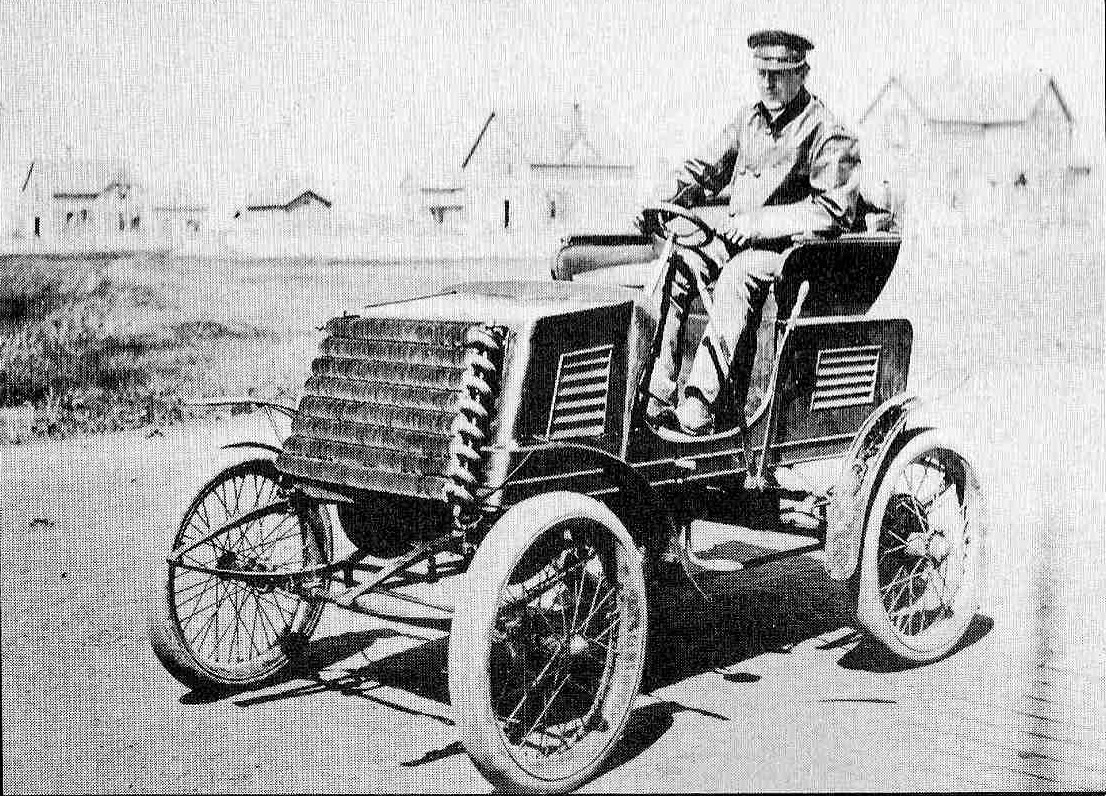
- Charles T. Jeffery in 1901
- Born: May 13, 1876
- Died: November 10, 1935 (aged 59); Merion Station, Pennsylvania
- Occupation: Businessman

Charles Thomas Jeffery (13 May 1876 – 10 November 1935) was an American businessman.

== Early life ==
He was the son of Thomas B. Jeffery, founder of Thomas B. Jeffery Company, an automobile manufacturer.

== Career ==
When his father died in 1910, Charles Jeffery assumed control of the Thomas B. Jeffery Company. Under his guidance, the firm continued to prosper. His most significant success was in the large number of heavy-duty trucks he manufactured.

The U.S. Army was Jeffery's best customer during the years of World War I. The four-wheel, chain-drive Jeffery Quad eventually became the workhorse of the Allied Expeditionary Force. Jeffery also made impressive advances in sales of his automobile. He dropped the Rambler marque in 1914 in favor of "Jeffery" and produced 10,283 of them.

=== RMS Lusitania ===
Jeffery was totally committed to the company and its success before he became a passenger on the ill-fated passenger ship RMS Lusitania in 1915. It was sunk after being torpedoed by a German submarine off the Irish coast, with a heavy loss of life. Jeffery survived, but he lost interest in the company, or as one author put it, "re-evaluated his priorities". The Jeffery Company was put up for sale, and Charles Nash purchased the Thomas B. Jeffery Company and Charles T. Jeffery's lakeside commercial property at 6221 Third Avenue, Kenosha.

== Collections and death ==
During his lifetime, Jeffery collected an extensive library of rare books, maps and autographs which was sold at auction following his death at Merion Station, Pennsylvania.
