= Londonderry Lithia =

Brand of bottled lithia water

- Country: United States
- Source: Londonderry Lithia spring
- Type: still/sparkling
- pH: unknown
- TDS: unknown
- All concentrations in milligrams per liter (mg/L); pH without units

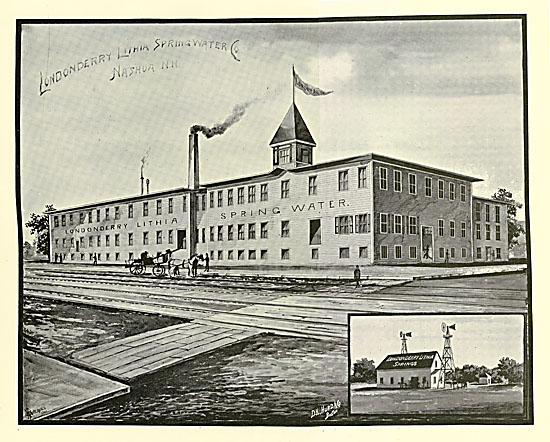
Bottling plant in 1892.

Londonderry Lithia was a brand of bottled lithia water sold in the northeastern United States during the late 19th and early 20th centuries. The source of the water was in Londonderry, New Hampshire, and the company headquarters of the Londonderry Lithia Spring Water Company was in Nashua, New Hampshire.

Used as a table water and in the treatment of kidney troubles.

— Artemas Ward, The Grocer's Encyclopedia

As a marketing promotion, Annie Kopchovsky, the first woman to bicycle around the world, changed her name in 1895 to Annie Londonderry and carried the company's placard on her journey.

== Composition ==
According to the company, the water had been analyzed by Prof. H. Halvorson and found to contain among various other minerals 8.620 grains of lithium bicarbonate per Imperial gallon. However, following the prohibition of adulterated and misbranded drugs, a government chemist determined that the water contained only a spectroscopic trace of lithium, less than 1/1200 grain per gallon, and that sodium chloride and sodium bicarbonate had been added to some samples. This resulted in action condemning and forfeiting the product. The company ceased production by 1920.
