= Sterling Bicycle Co. =

19th-century American bicycle manufacturer

- Industry: Manufacturing
- Headquarters: United States
- Products: Bicycles

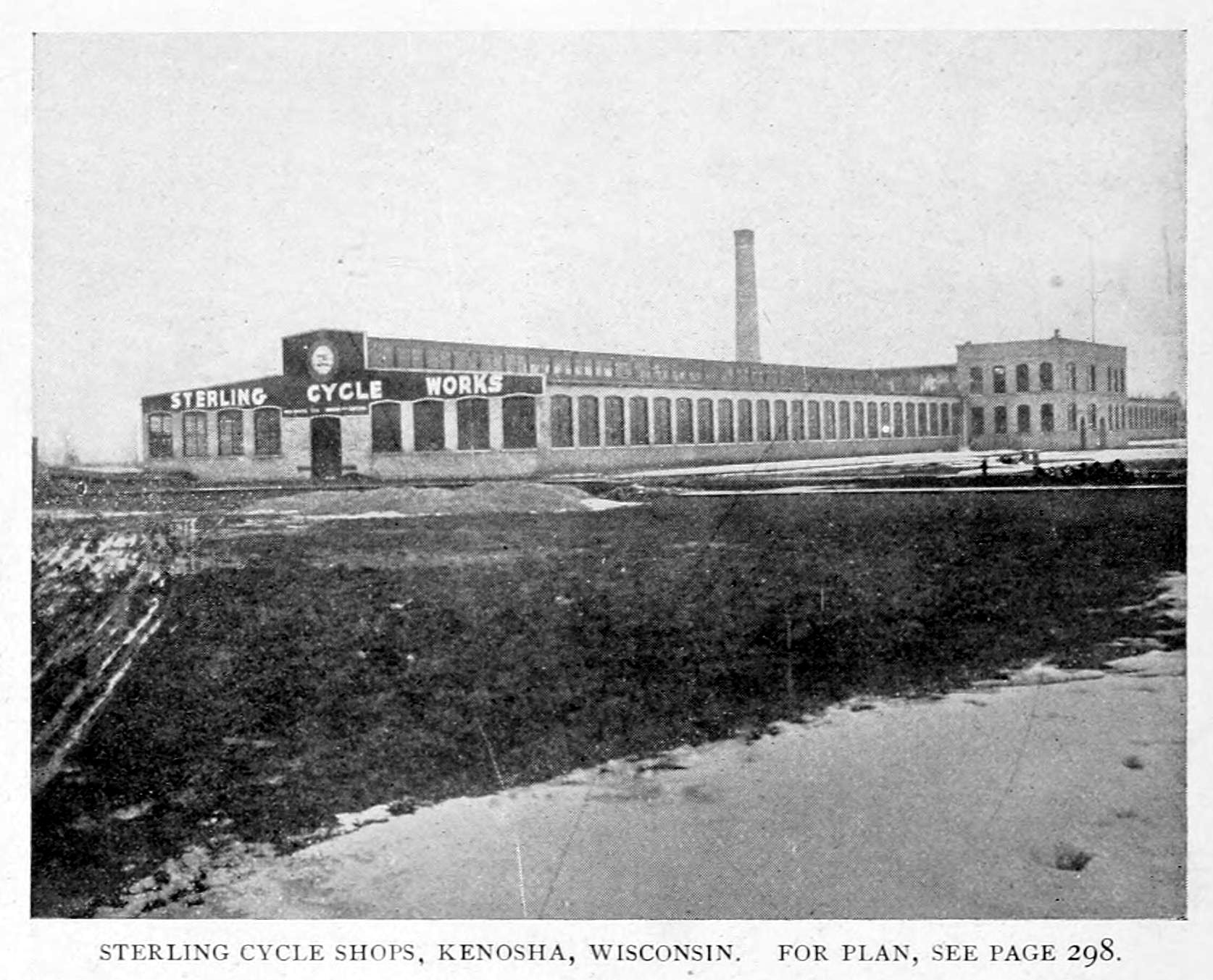
Sterling Cycle Shops, Kenosha, Wisconsin, 1896.

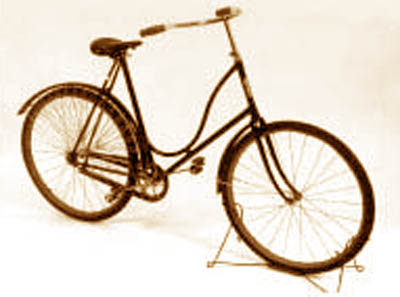
A 19th-century Sterling Bicycle

Sterling Bicycle Co. (also known as Sterling Cycle Works) was a 19th-century American bicycle company first based in Chicago, Illinois before relocating to Kenosha, Wisconsin.

== History ==
In 1894 Annie "Londonderry" Kopchovsky traveled "around the world" on a Sterling. Starting from Boston and heading west, her first bike was a Columbia but it proved unsuitable. In Chicago, the Sterling company gave her a men's Sterling (weighing 21 pounds, it had no brakes) which made riding in skirts impossible. She then wore bloomers and finally rode in a men's riding suit. Peter Zheutlin's book "Around the World on Two Wheels" records her journey. She claimed to be the first woman to "cycle around the world", duplicating a feat that Thomas Stevens had accomplished 10 years earlier. However, there was much controversy at the time as to whether she really had ridden her bicycle the entire way. In fact, she bicycled across the United States and France, and took steamships and trains the remainder of the way, while obscuring that fact in frequent newspaper accounts. Her ride came during the late 1800s "bicycle craze" and she gained widespread attention for her feat and for wearing bloomers (op cit).

In "The Works: The Industrial Architecture of the United States" (by Betsy Hunter Bradley – Oxford Press – Out of print?) a history of industrial buildings, the Sterling Cycle Works in Kenosha are cited by Harold Arnold ("engineer and industrial journalist") as an example of an 'open shop', a single story, unpartitioned machine shop. This dates the shop to Kenosha in 1895.

In 1898 Sterling won a Silver Medal at the Trans-Mississippi International Exposition held in Omaha, Nebraska for its "chainless bicycles and safeties".

In 1899, Sterling bikes were announced to be sold by the "American Bicycle Company" a consortium of 44 American bike and bike part manufacturers. Incorporation papers assert these 44 companies accounted for 60% of bicycles sold in the U.S. and that, in 1899, "661,000 wheels" were sold (ibid).

The 1899 Outing magazine lists Sterling's prices as "Chainless, for men and women, $75; racers, $65; roadsters, for men and women, $50; tandems, double diamond or combination, $75 or $85." The "chainless" drive is described as unique in that its longer connecting shaft connected the pinion to the rear sprocket gears back of the rear hub instead of in front of it.

The defunct Kenosha factory was sold to Thomas B. Jeffery in 1900 who turned it into one of the first automobile factories in the U.S., in operation until 1988 under Nash Motors and later American Motors.

After the American Bicycle Company went bankrupt about 1900, the Westfield Manufacturing Company acquired Sterling assets (patents and trademarks) and would manufacture "The Sterling" bicycles in its own Westfield complex, with the motto "built like a watch".

The "Hand Book of the United States Tariff 1913 references the Sterling Cycle Works, again of Chicago as in importer of steel tubing.

=== Dates of operation ===
- Sterling Cycle Co., Chicago, IL, 1894–1898
- Sterling Cycle Co., Kenosha, WI, 1899

== Advertisements ==
Slogans: "Built like a watch" and "Worldwide is the Sterling's reputation"

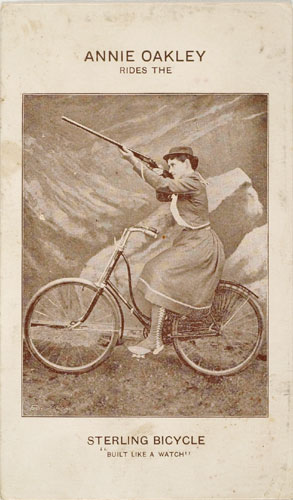
Annie Oakley ad

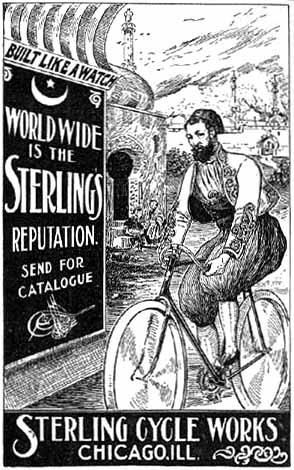
Persian (Iran) ad – 1897

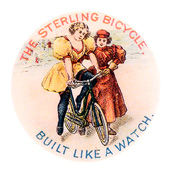
Logo

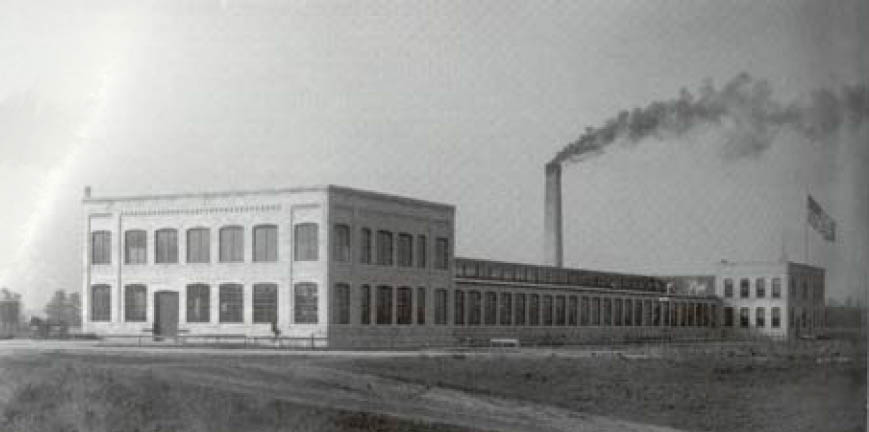
The Kenosha Factory
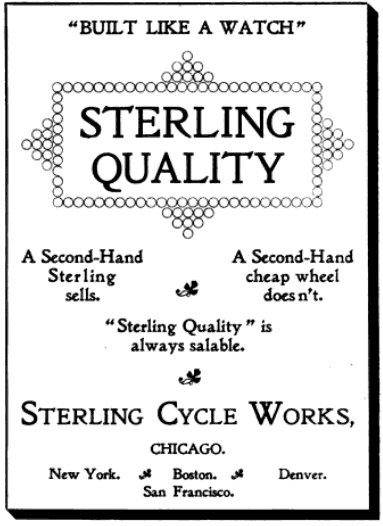
Sterling Cycle Works – Chicago 1897

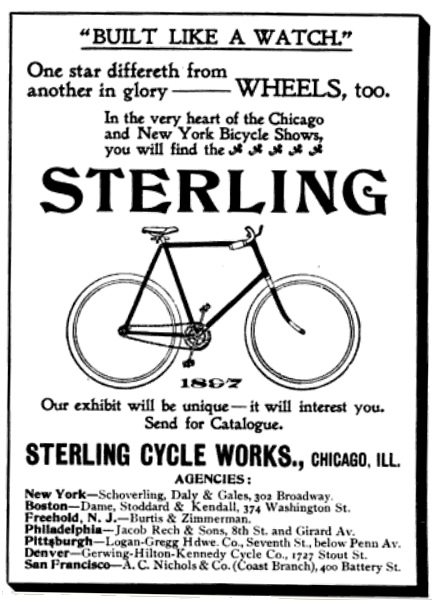
Sterling Cycle Works – Chicago 1897

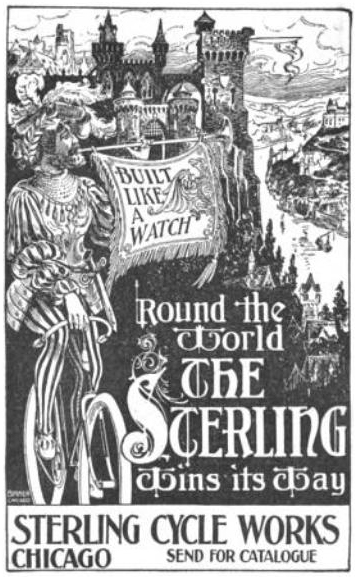
Sterling Cycle Works – Chicago 1897
