= Jeffery Quad =

American four-wheel drive truck

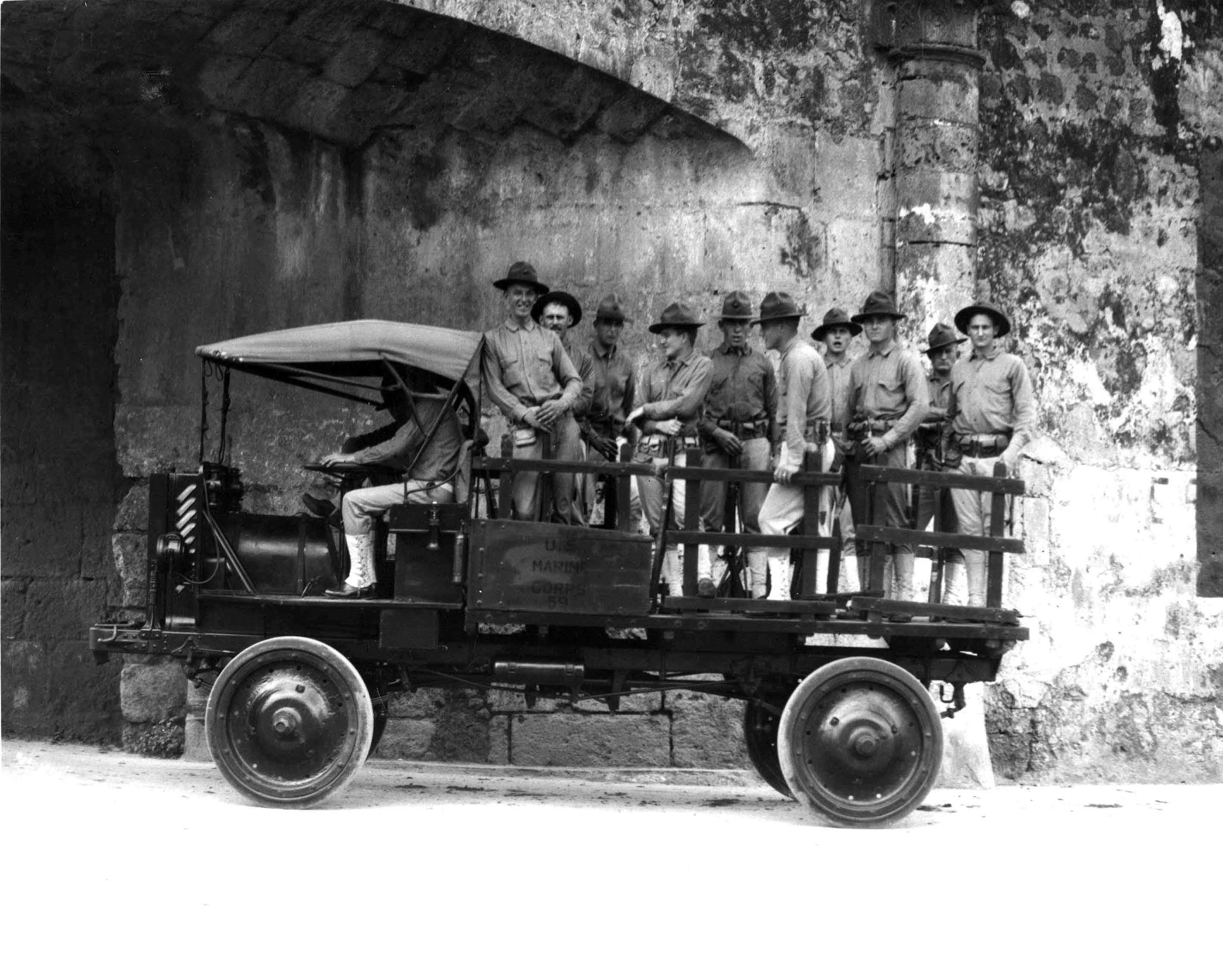
- U.S. Marines riding in a Jeffery Quad, Fort Santo Domingo, c. 1916

Overview
- Manufacturer: Thomas B. Jeffery Company; Nash Motors after 1916
- Also called: Nash Quad
- Production: 1912–1928

Body and chassis
- Layout: Front-engine, four-wheel-drive

Powertrain
- Engine: Buda, 312 cu in (5.1 L) side-valve 4-cylinder, 28 hp (21 kW; 28 PS)
- Transmission: four-speed, four wheel drive, hub-reduction gearing

Dimensions
- Length: 200 in (5,080 mm)
- Width: 74 in (1,880 mm)
- Height: 85.5 in (2,172 mm) without canopy
- Curb weight: 5,350 lb (2,427 kg); Payload = 3,000 lb (1,361 kg)

The Jeffery Quad, also known as the Nash Quad or Quad, is a four-wheel drive, 1 1/2-ton rated truck that was developed and built by the Thomas B. Jeffery Company from 1912 in Kenosha, Wisconsin, and after 1916 by Nash Motors, which acquired the Jeffery Company. Production of the Quad continued unchanged through 1928.

The Quad introduced numerous engineering innovations. Its design and durability proved effective in traversing the muddy, rough, and unpaved roads of the time. The Quad also became one of the most successful vehicles in World War I. The Quad was produced in large numbers by Jeffery and Nash, as well as under license by other truck makers.

== Development ==
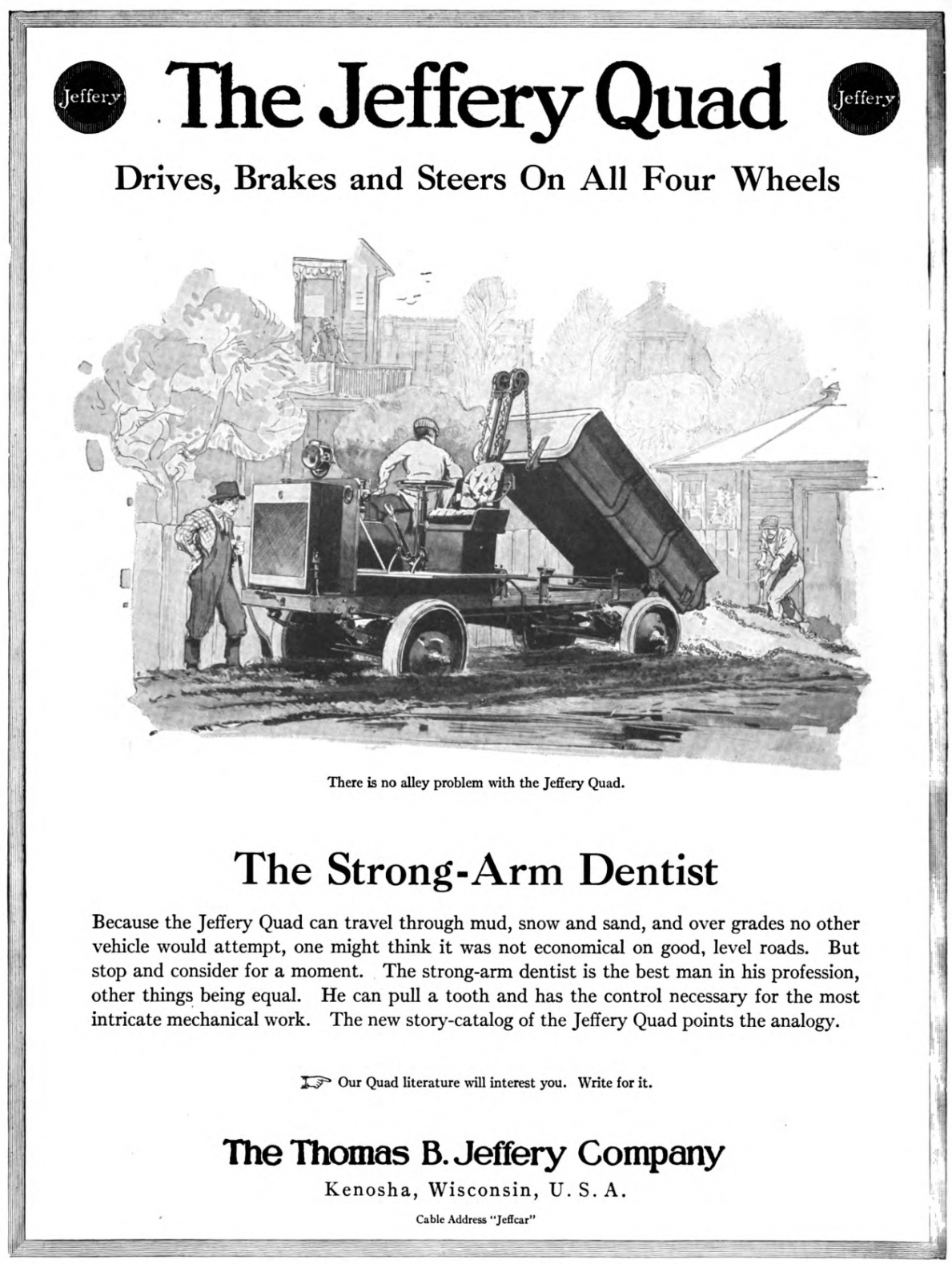
Jeffery Quad advertisement (1915)

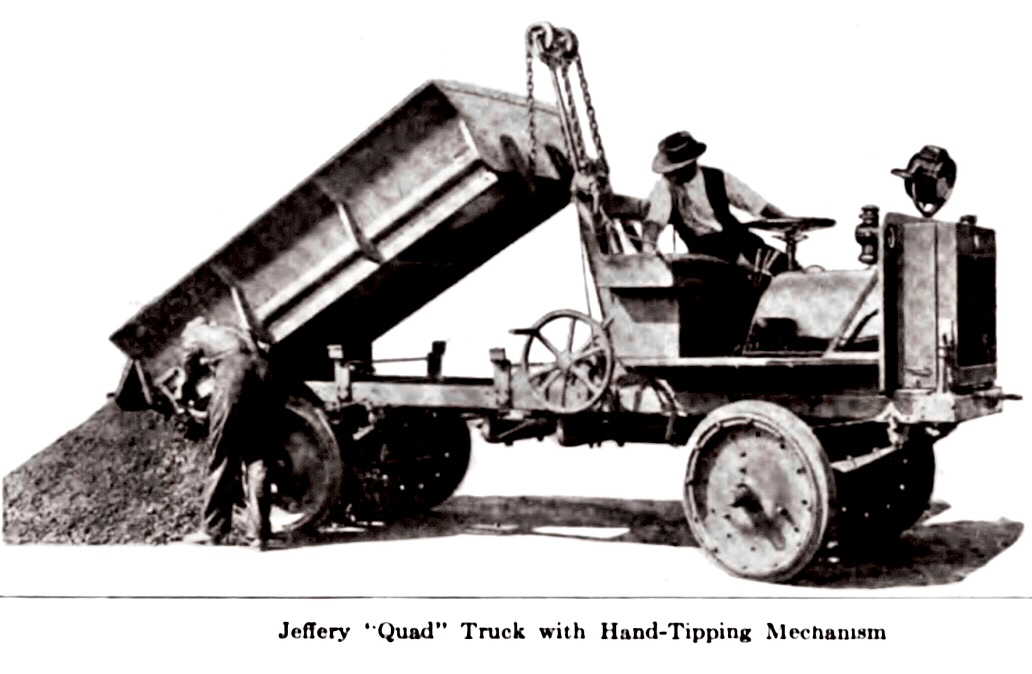
Jeffery Quad (1915).

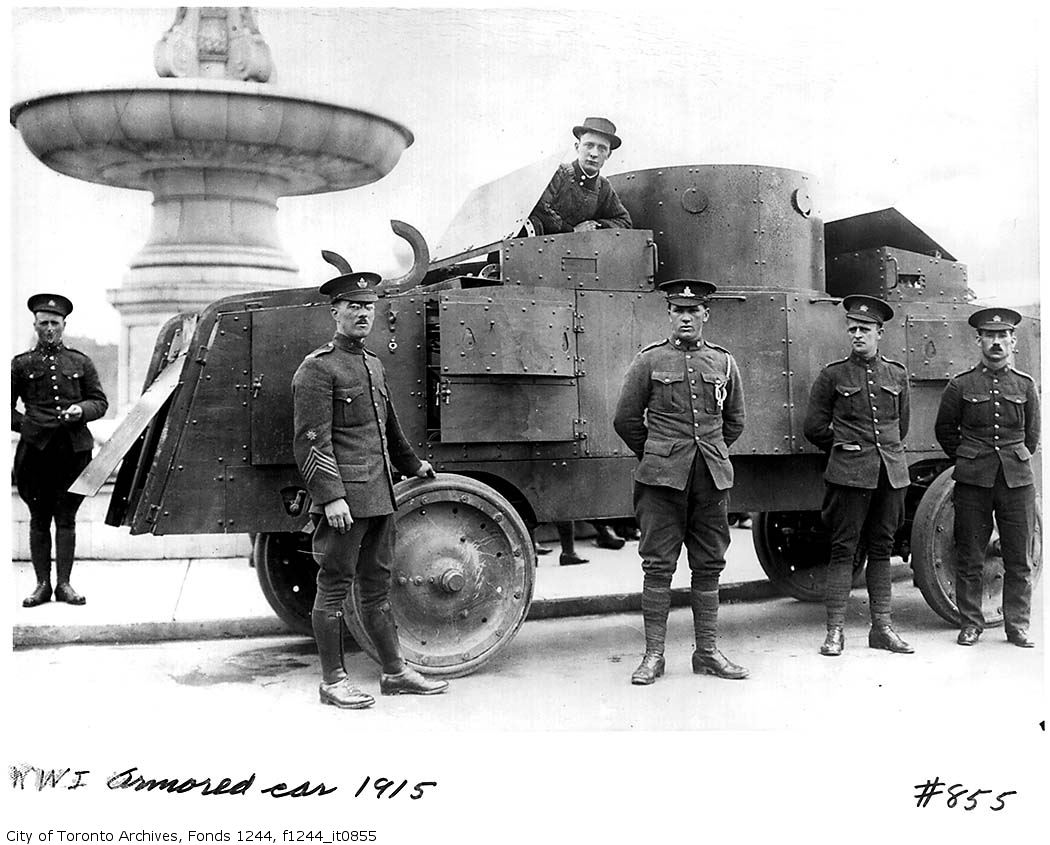
Jeffery armoured car 1915

The United States Army needed to replace the four-mule teams used to haul standard one-and-a-half-ton loads with a truck and requested proposals in late 1912.

The company began development by purchasing and examining a new Four Wheel Drive Auto Company (FWD) truck, but found it to be unacceptable and sold the vehicle to begin their own design from scratch. By July 1913, Jeffery had their 3,000 lb (1,361 kg) capacity truck ready for public demonstration of its capabilities.

Jeffery designed a four-wheel-drive truck, known as the "Quad" or "Jeffery Quad," which greatly assisted the subsequent efforts during World War I by several Allied nations, particularly the French. The Jeffery Quad became the workhorse of the Allied Expeditionary Force.

These unique vehicles also saw heavy service under General John J. "Blackjack" Pershing as both the Jeffery armored car and as regular transports during the Army's 1916 Punitive Expedition through Mexico; Quads were also used extensively during Pershing's later European campaigns of World War I. The United States Marine Corps also adopted the Jeffery Quad, using it in the occupation of Haiti, and of the Dominican Republic, from 1915 through 1917. After WWI the United States government sold or distributed the majority of their surplus trucks to local governments and municipalities. Surplus Quads proved popular as road-construction vehicles during the postwar Good Roads Movement.

In the French Army, though viewed as obsolete, Jeffery Quads remained in service with some regiments of the truck-borne artillerie portée as late as the 1939 mobilization at the outbreak of the Second World War. Used to haul 75mm field guns, these vehicles were progressively replaced by more modern Berliet trucks.

At least 11,500 Jeffery and Nash Quads were built between 1913 and 1919. In 1918 alone, Nash built 11,490 of its Quads, a world record at the time.

"Four-wheel drive trucks had been built before ..., but aside from the Jeffery Quad (Nash Quad, per subsequent purchase) earlier designs were inefficient, crude, and flimsy."

== Design ==
Initially called the Rambler Quadruple for its car-derived 281.4 cu in (4.6 L) Rambler four-cylinder that produced 21 hp (16 kW; 21 PS). Development called for a switch to a Buda-manufactured 312 cu in (5.1 L) side-valve four-cylinder engine that was rated at 28 hp (21 kW; 28 PS), but actually produced 52 hp (39 kW; 53 PS) at 1,800 rpm.

The Quad had four-wheel drive and four-wheel brakes, as well as an innovative four-wheel steering system. This novel approach to steering allowed the rear wheels to track the front wheels around turns, such that the rear wheels did not have to dig new "ruts" on muddy curves because most roads of the day were unpaved and often badly rutted.

This four-wheel steering mechanism was integrated with Muehl limited-slip differentials on both the front and rear axles.

From the transfer case, shafts led to the top of both the front and rear solid portal axles giving the trucks a very high ground clearance allowing it to drive through mud up to its hubcaps. Engine power was transmitted by half-shafts with a u-joint and bearing that was connected by a pinion gear to each of the four wheels from the dual differentials that positioned parallel to but above the load-bearing "dead" axles. This pinion gear then drove an internal toothed ring gear at each of the four wheels.

The Quad's combination of innovative features constituted a revolutionary approach to four-wheel drive and allowed the truck to traverse soft and poor conditions with unprecedented effectiveness.

The Quad was fitted with a Borg & Beck clutch, providing excellent reliability for the enduring environment.

== Legacy ==
The Quad was one of the first successful four-wheel drive vehicles ever to be made, and its production continued for 15 years with a total of 41,674 units made. Concurrently with the Quad's production, the company expanded its truck line by building conventional 1.5-ton trucks with double chain rear-wheel drive.

The Quad's ability to traverse terrain across the globe that challenged modern trucks meant civilians used their slow, but unstoppable work at least until the 1950s.

In 1954, Nash Motors merged with Hudson Motor Car Company to form American Motors Corporation (AMC), which acquired the vehicle operations of Kaiser Jeep in 1970 to complement its passenger car lines, later including the AWD/4WD AMC Eagle. The combined automaker's ancestry reached back to the famed World War I "Quad".

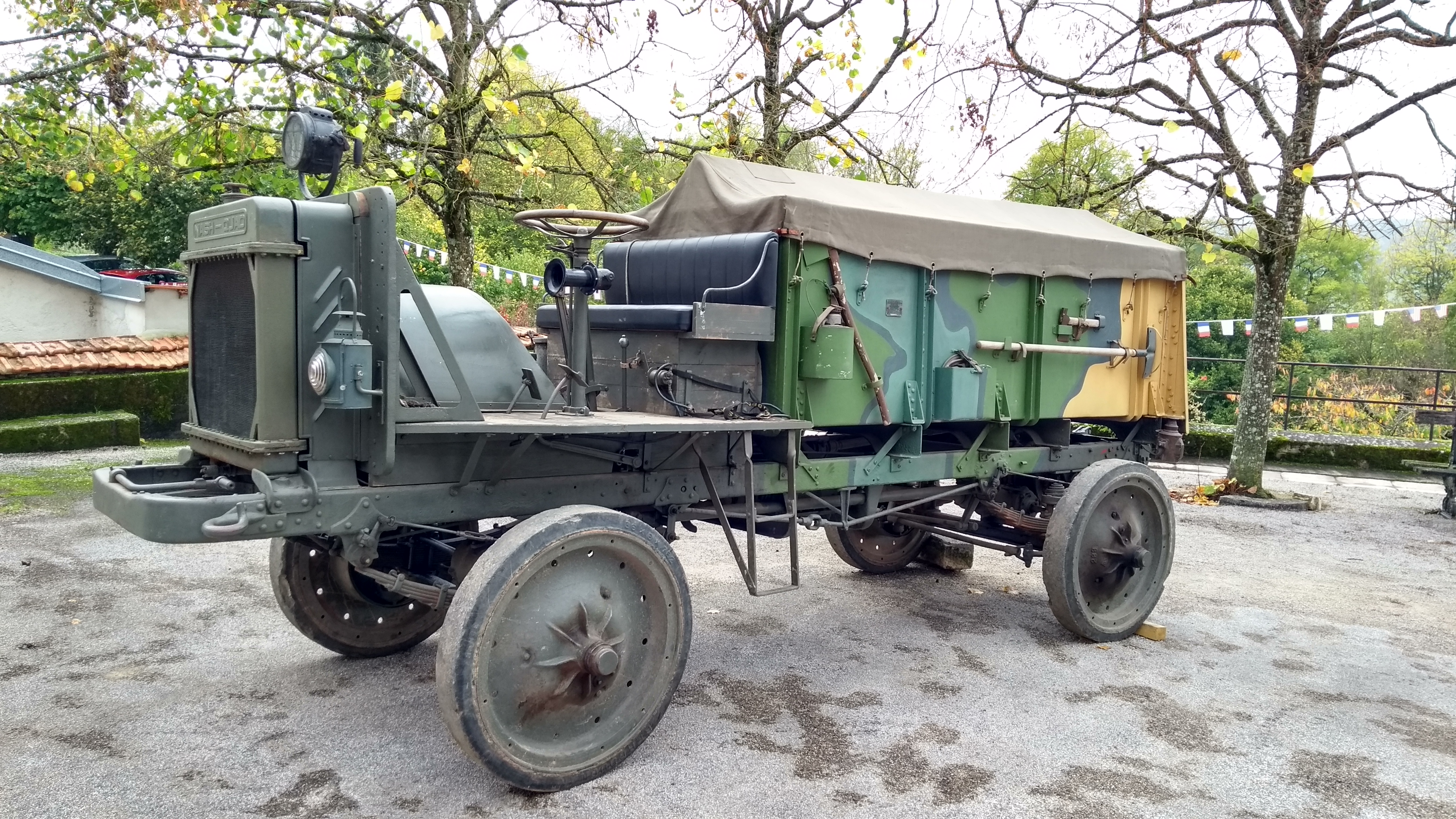

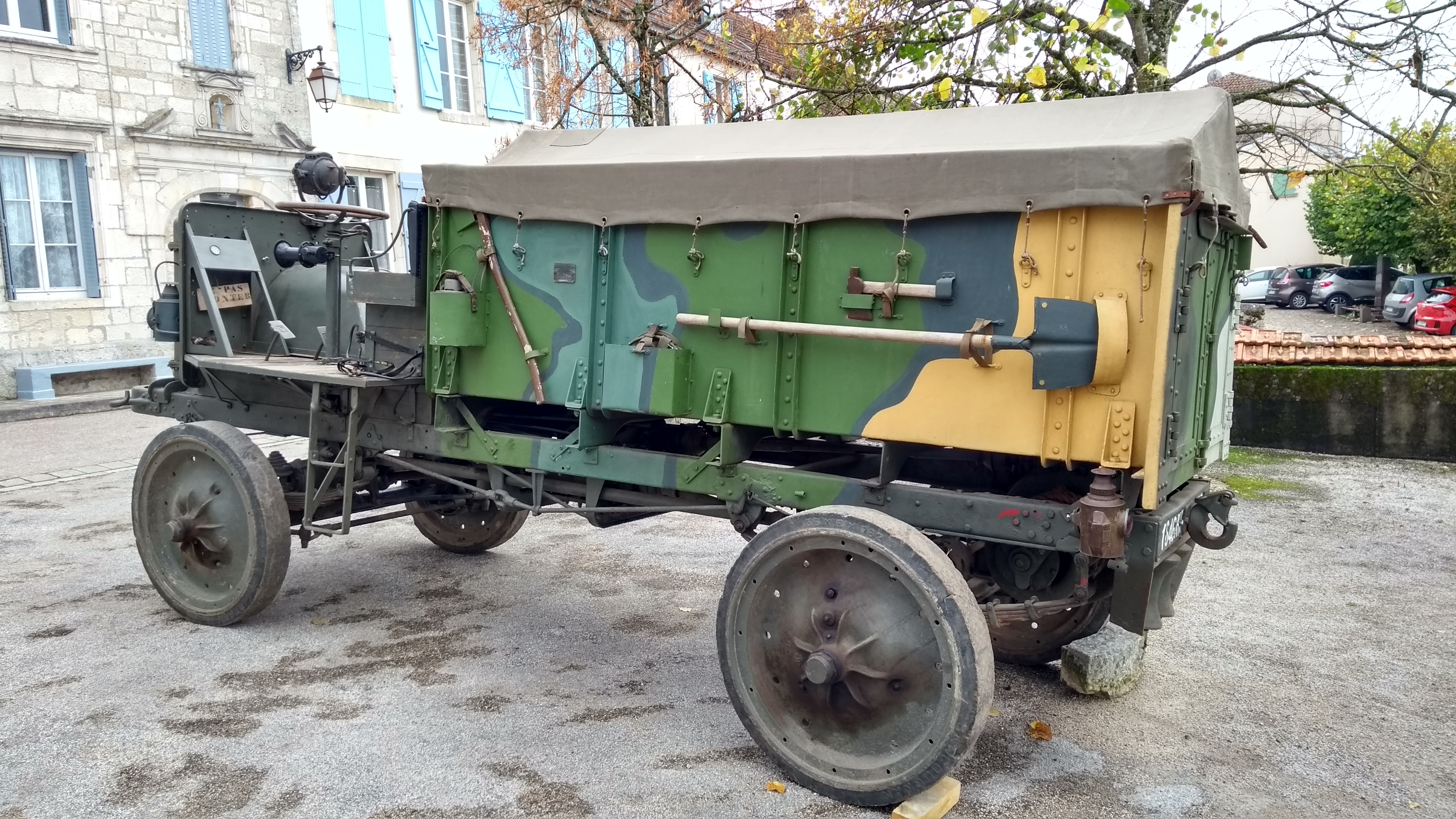

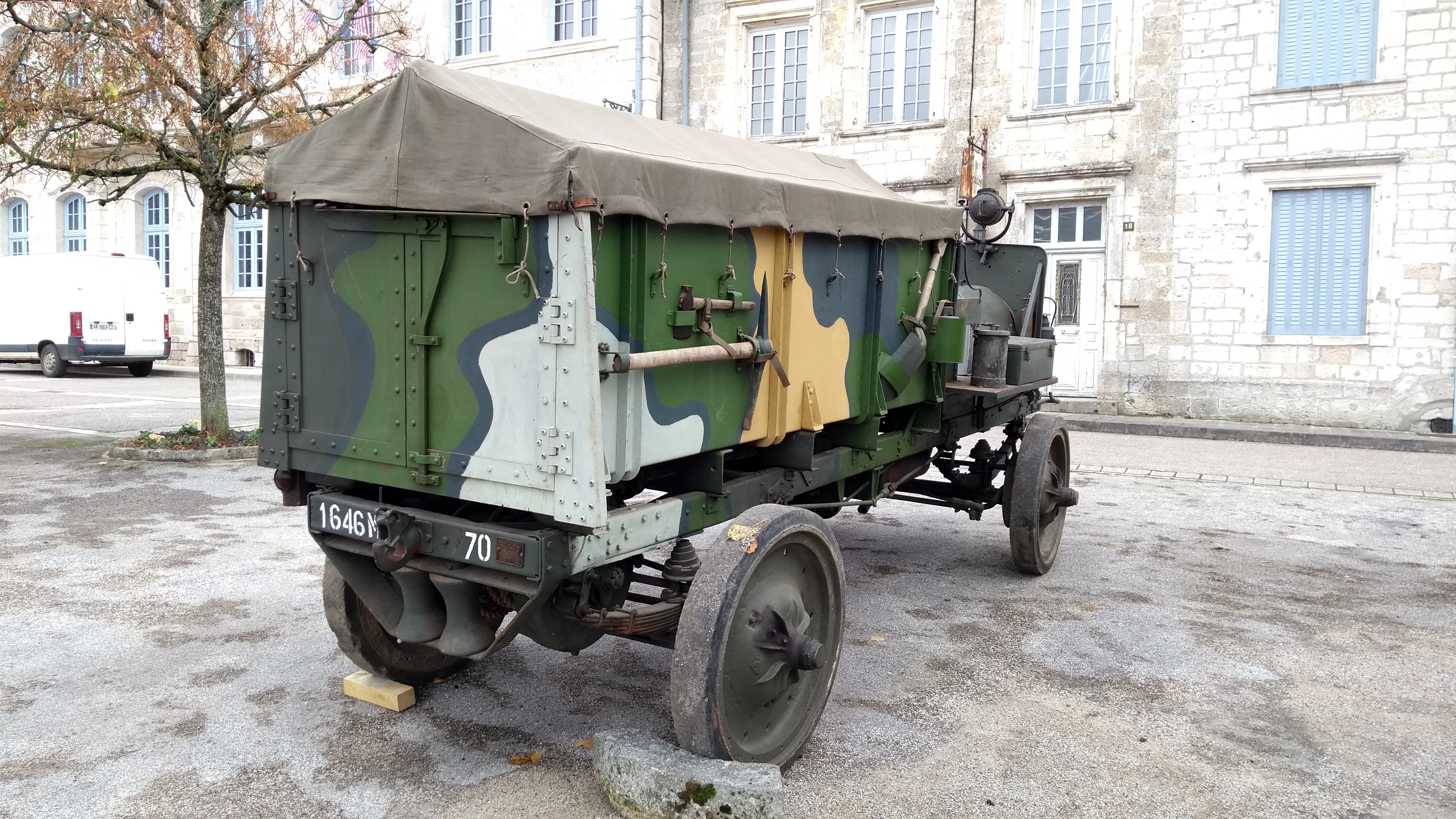

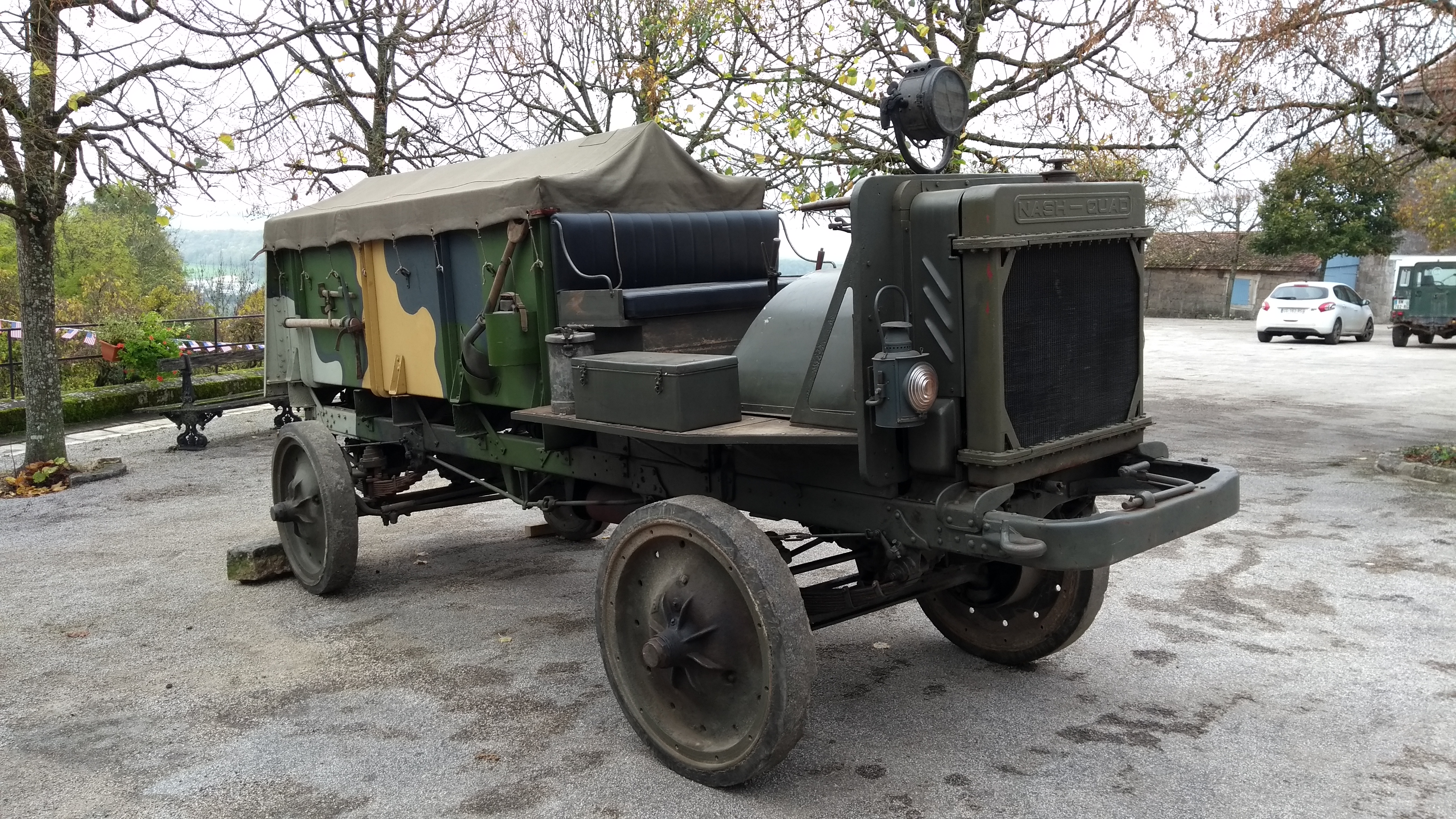

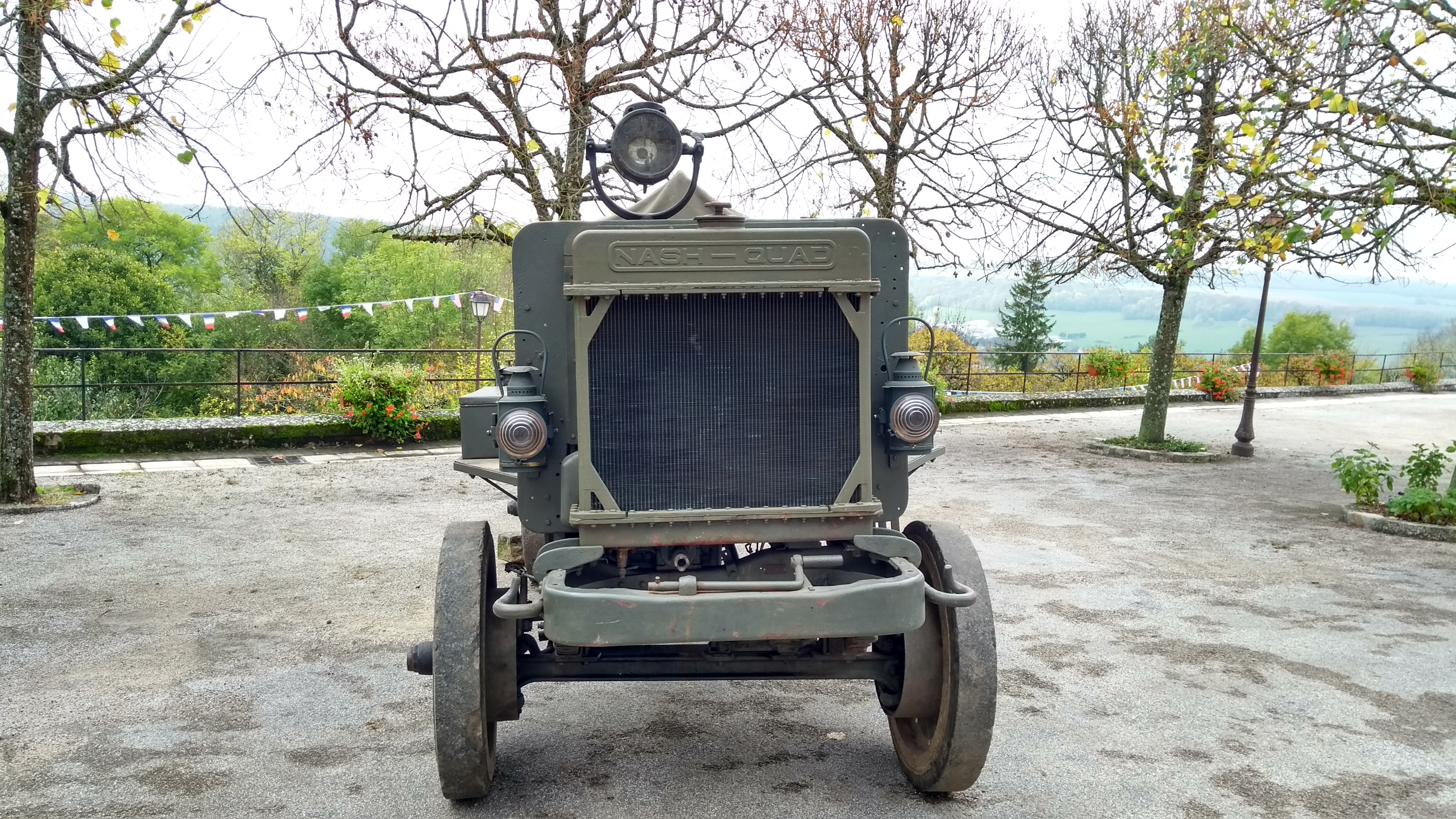
