= Stoke Damerel Church =

Church in Devon, England

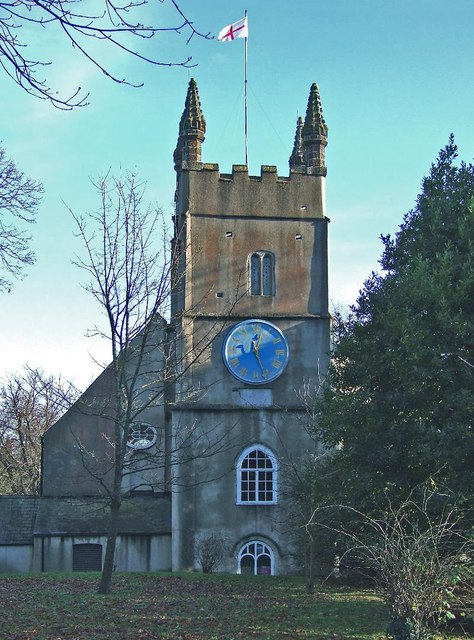
- Stoke Damerel Church

Religion
- Affiliation: Church of England
- Ecclesiastical or organizational status: Active

Location
- Location: Stoke, Plymouth, Devon, England
- Interactive map of Stoke Damerel Church
- Coordinates: 50.3747°N 4.1625°W

Architecture
- Type: Church

Stoke Damerel Church, also known as the Church of St Andrew with St Luke, is a Church of England church in Stoke, Plymouth, Devon, England. Dating from the 15th century, the church has been Grade II* listed since 1954. In addition to its listed status, the northern churchyard gate piers are also Grade II listed, alongside two 19th-century tombs, one of which belongs to Captain Tobias Furneaux.

== History ==
An earlier church is known to have existed on the site of the existing building, with records dating back to the 13th century. The existing church dates from the 15th century, with the tower being the oldest part. It underwent extensive reconstruction and alteration during the 18th century, including enlargement in 1715 and 1751 as a result of population growth in the parish of Stoke Damerel and to serve personnel of HMNB Devonport. Further work was carried out in the 19th century including a clock being added to the tower in 1811, the rebuilding of the chancel in 1868 and a restoration in 1883.

A failed scheme to replace the church was carried out at the beginning of the 20th century. Although a new rectory and part of the proposed new building had been built in 1902, the scheme was soon abandoned and the existing church underwent restoration in 1904 and continued to serve the parish.
