= Jeffery armored car =

US/Canadian armored car

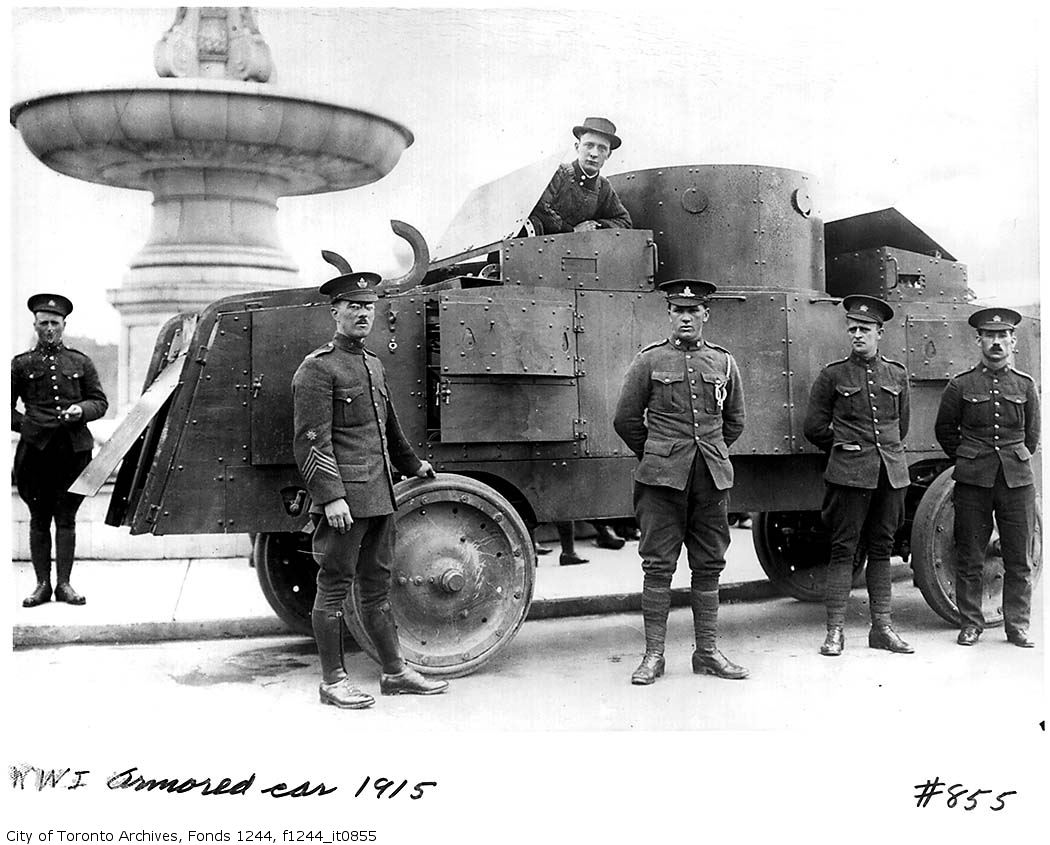
- A Jeffery-Russel armored car, likely of the Eaton Motor Machine Gun Battery, seen in Toronto, Ontario.
- Type: Armored car
- Place of origin: United States; Canada

Service history
- Used by: Canada; British India Command; United States Army: Austro-Hungary
- Wars: Pancho Villa Expedition

Production history
- Manufacturer: Thomas B. Jeffery Company
- Produced: 1915

Specifications
- Length: 18 ft (5.48 m)
- Width: 6.4 ft (1.95 m)
- Height: 8 ft (2.44 m)
- Crew: 4
- Main armament: 4 x Hotchkiss M1909 Benét–Mercié machine guns (No. 1) or 1 x .303 Vickers machine gun (Jeffery-Russel)
- Engine: 4-cylinder petrol
- Suspension: 4x4 wheel
- Maximum speed: 20 miles per hour (32 km/h) maximum

The Jeffery armored car was an armored car developed by the US and Canada. It saw heavy use in World War I. During World War I, the Austro-Hungarian monarchy also captured a few pieces.

== Armored Car No. 1 ==
The Jeffery Armored Car No.1 was developed by the Thomas B. Jeffery Company in Kenosha, Wisconsin in 1915 with a hull from the Rock Island Arsenal.

The armored car No.1 was used in General John Pershing’s 1916 Pancho Villa Expedition in Columbus, New Mexico for training. Pancho Villa was far into Mexico at that time and there are no records on its use in fighting.

== Jeffery-Russel armored cars ==
The Russel company in Canada built a number of armored cars on the four-wheel drive Jeffery chassis. After serving in Canada for a while they were sent to the UK. From there they were sent on to British India. Forty were added to the "Field Force" that was operating to contain the Mohmand rising of Haji Mullah on the North West Frontier. The "Mohmand blockade" involved British armored cars patrolling unpaved tracks between blockhouses. Maintenance of the cars was difficult as the ship carrying spares had been torpedoed. They were armed with a single Vickers machine gun. Although the four-wheel drive with independent transmission and wide range of gears should have been an advantage, the narrow solid tires negated that and running at more than 12 mph (19 km/h) caused problems with engine bearings.

== Jeffery-Poplavko ==
A different model of armored car basing on the Jeffery Quad chassis was built in Russia by Ukrainian officer Victor Poplavko who was the Odessa city commandant (1917–18), and was known as Jeffery-Poplavko.

== Gallery ==
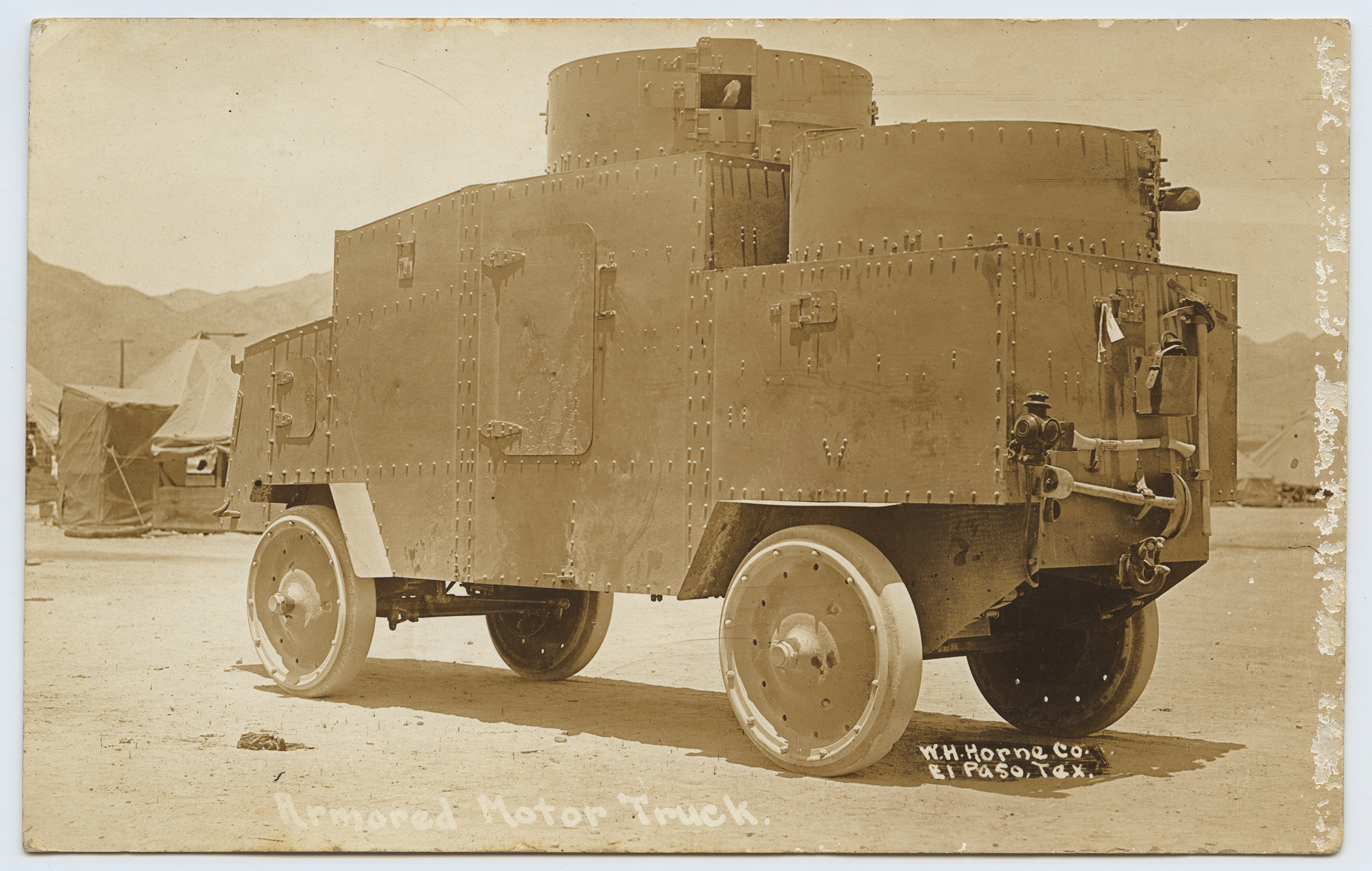
No. 1 c. 1916 in Mexico

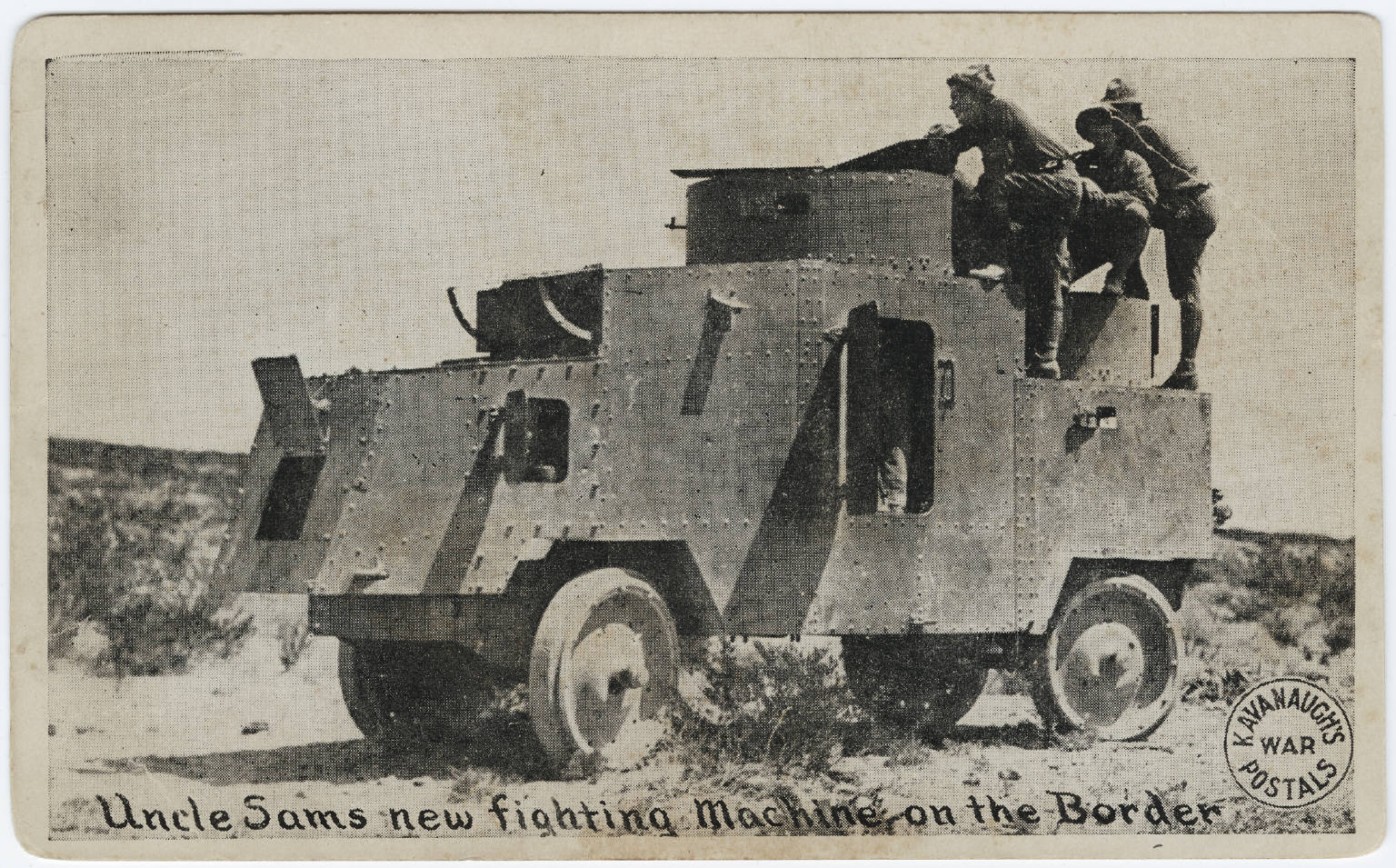
Ditto

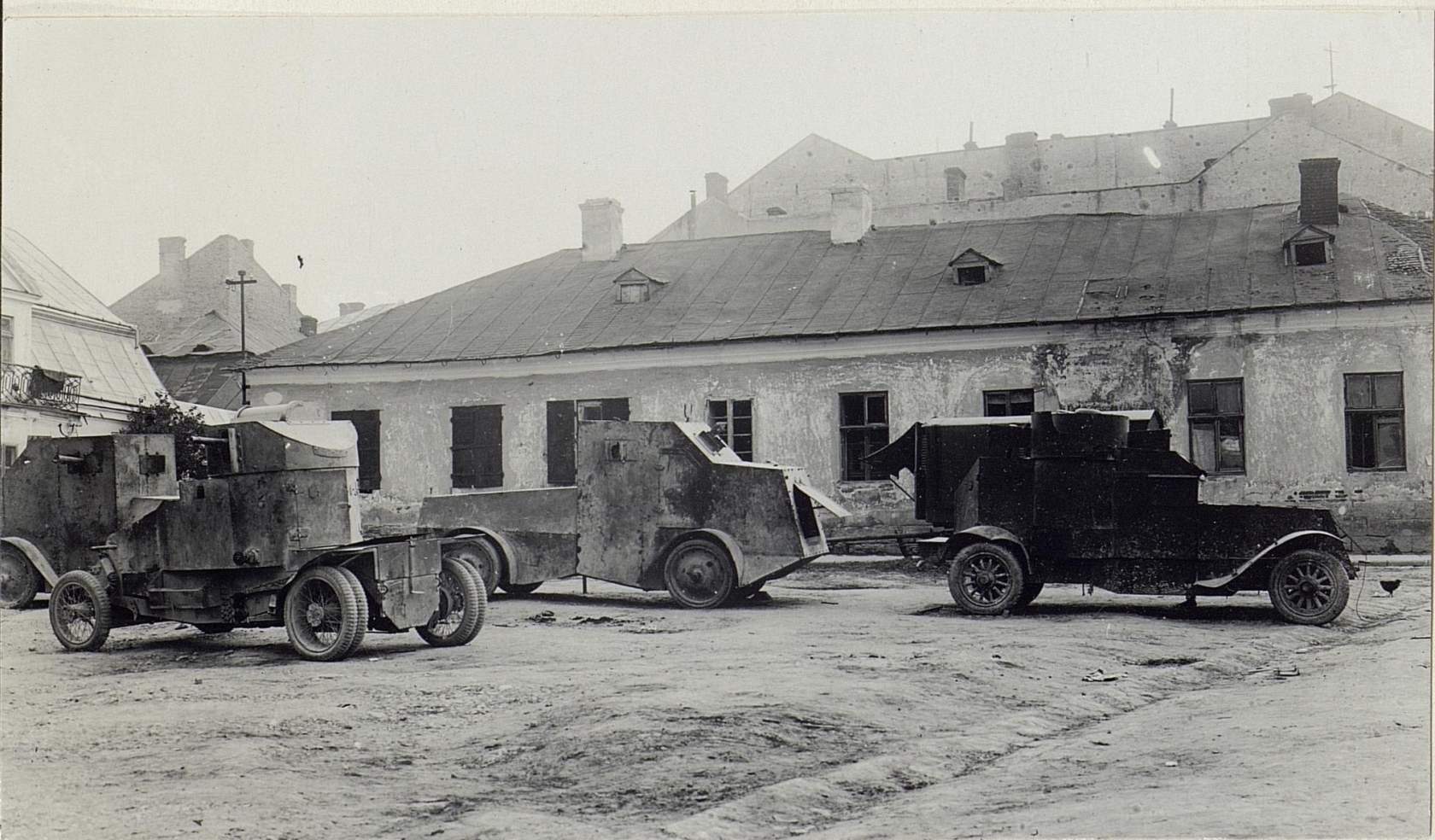
Russian Jeffery-Poplavko (in centre and on the left)
