= Thomas B. Jeffery =

Thomas Buckland Jeffery
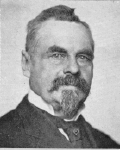
- Born: February 5, 1845; Stoke Damerel, Devon, England
- Died: April 2, 1910 (aged 65); Pompeii, Italy
- Occupations: Inventor and manufacturer
- Known for: Bicycles, clincher rim, and Rambler automobiles
- Awards: 1974: Inductee Automotive Hall of Fame

Thomas Buckland Jeffery (5 February 1845 – 2 April 1910) was a British emigrant to the United States who co-founded the Gormully & Jeffery company which made the Rambler bicycle. He invented the "clincher" rim which was widely used to fit tires to bicycles and early automobiles, and in 1900 established the Thomas B. Jeffery Company to make automobiles, again using Rambler branding.

== Early life ==
Jeffery was born on 5 February 1845 at 3 Mill Pleasant in Stoke Damerel, Devon, England to Thomas Hellier and Elizabeth (Buckland) Jeffery. At sixteen years of age he was working as a "mathematical instrument maker."

At eighteen years of age, he emigrated to the United States and became a resident of Chicago, where "he was connected with the business of manufacturing telescopes." Later he was engaged in making models for the patent office.

== Bicycle manufacturer ==
In 1879, Jefferey, together with R. Philip Gormully, started the Gormully & Jeffery Manufacturing Company and began making the Rambler bicycle.·

Jeffery was an inventor and bicycle manufacturer with his partner, R. Philip Gormully, who built and sold Rambler bicycles through his company, Gormully & Jeffery Mfg. Co., in Chicago from 1878 to 1900. The Rambler was still a proud piece of machinery when low prices took precedence over high quality. Its body featured flared metal tubing for extra strength at the joints, which were brazed by immersion in molten brass. These techniques continued even after Gormully & Jeffery and Rambler became names of the American Bicycle Company, or Bicycle Trust, which was not known for the best manufacturing techniques in all of its lines.

By 1900, Gormully & Jeffery was the country's second-largest bicycle maker and Jeffery had gained fame for developing, among other things, the clincher rim that enabled pneumatic tires to be used. Jeffery and Gormully were pioneers in the field.

== Invention of the clincher rim ==
Dunlop's original pneumatic tires were wrapped onto the rim, making them hard to service. The challenge was securely fastening the tire to the rim, while also allowing it to be easily removed for service. This was an era where horseshoe nails and other sharp debris were common on roads and tires typically had to be repaired every 100 miles.

From 1889 to 1895, a slew of patents were filed with various methods of fastening tires to rims. Jeffery came up with an improved tire, held on the rim by hard rubber flanges that locked into channels in the rim. This came to be known as the "Clincher" tire. Jeffery received a patent on the ancestor of all clincher tires in 1892 (US Patent 466,789). From 1900 to about 1913, clinchers (which are still used on some bicycles) were the most common form of tires used on U.S. automobiles.

William Erskine Bartlett patented a similar clincher technology in Great Britain and the respective patents prevented British companies from manufacturing in the U.S. and vice versa. in 1903 G&J formed The Clincher Tire Manufacturer's Association to license the use of their patent to tire companies, and the snubbing by CTMA of newcomers Goodyear and Firestone led these companies to develop the "straight-side" tire, which is the basis of all modern automobile tires. The ancestor of the straight-side tire was invented by Charles Kingston Welch in 1890. In 1906, CTMA lost a patent infringement suit over the G&J patent, opening the U.S. market to other manufacturers of clincher tires. In 1917, CTMA changed its name to the Tire and Rim Association and that organization still publishes an annual Year Book containing tire and wheel standards.

== Automobile manufacturer ==
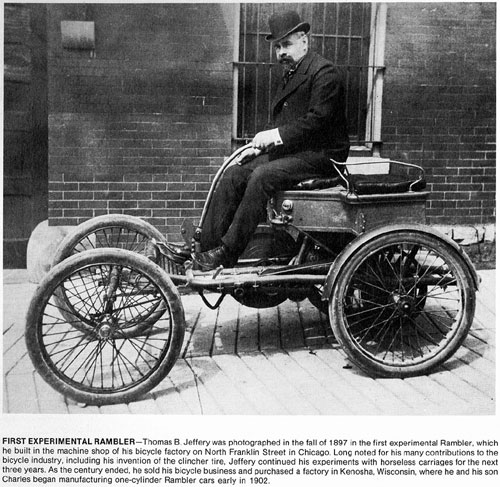
Thomas B. Jeffery and his 1897 Rambler prototype

Jeffery was one of America's first men interested in automobiles, and in 1897 he built the first Rambler motor car. It had a tiller-type steering and was powered by a 5 horsepower (4 kW; 5 PS) engine mounted under the seat

The 1900 Rambler Stanhope model was displayed at the first New York National Auto Show in Madison Square Garden. This was the first national car exhibition that began on November 3, 1900, lasting one week attracting 48,000 paid visitors to see 160 different cars and the show included a driving and maneuverability demonstrations on a 20-foot (6.1 m) wide track around the display areas. The Ramler Stanhope featured a water-cooled two-cylinder engine mounted in the front of the vehicle, all major innovations at a time when most American cars were still positioning an air-cooled engine under the seat. The 1901 Rambler Model A also featured a front-mounted engine and the steering was positioned on the left side for right-hand traffic.

Around 1900, Jeffery sold his stake in G&J and founded the Thomas B. Jeffery Company. He used the G&J money to buy the Sterling Bicycle Co. factory in Kenosha, Wisconsin, where he began to manufacture automobiles to produce them on a large scale.

From 1902 until 1908, Jeffery moved steadily to bigger, more reliable models. His cars were built on assembly lines (the second manufacturer to adopt them—Ransom E. Olds was first), and in 1903 he sold 1,350 Ramblers. By 1905, Jeffery more than doubled this number. One reason may have been because he went to the steering wheel before 1904.

In 1907, he was building a large variety of different body styles and sizes. Among them was a five-passenger, $2,500 Rambler weighing 2,600 pounds (1,179 kg) and powered by a 40 horsepower (30 kW; 41 PS) engine.

His company also assisted all motorists by financing the first road signs that were put up in Kenosha County, Wisconsin.

Jeffery died in 1910 while on holiday in Pompeii, in Italy. After his death, his son Charles T. Jeffery changed the automotive branding from Rambler to Jeffery in the founder's honor.

== Legacy ==
In 1916, Jeffery's family sold the manufacturing business to Charles W. Nash, who renamed the company Nash Motors and greatly expanded its products and manufacturing. Nash also brought back the Rambler automobile nameplate and the product line continued after Nash and Hudson merged to form American Motors Corporation, which retained the Rambler name into the 1970s in U.S. and foreign markets.

== Monopoly fighter ==
Jeffery contested several patents:

- Fought the Pope bicycle patent and won.
- Fought the Selden bicycle patent and won.

== Timeline ==
- 1878 – Jeffery partners with Phillip Gormully and starts the Gormully & Jeffery Manufacturing Company in Chicago, Illinois.
- 1892 – Jeffery invents the "Clincher Tire".
- 1897 – Jeffery builds a rear-engine Rambler prototype using the Rambler name previously used on a highly successful line of bicycles made by G&J.
- 1899 – Positive reviews at the 1899 Chicago International Exhibition & Tournament and the first National Automobile Show in New York prompt the Jefferys to enter the automobile business.
- 1900 – Jeffery sells his stake in G&J to the American Bicycle Company.
- 1900 (Dec 6) – Thomas B. Jeffery finalizes a $65,000 deal to buy the Kenosha, factory of the defunct Sterling Bicycle Co. with money from the sale of his interest in the G&J.
- 1901 – Two more prototypes, Models A and B, are made.
- 1902 – First production Ramblers – the $750 Model C open runabout and the $850 Model D (the same car with a folding top). Both are powered by an 8-hp, 98cu. in., 1-cyl. engine mounted beneath the seat, and both are steered by a pioneering right-side tiller (a new concept at the time). First-year production totals 1,500 units making Jeffery the second-largest car maker behind Olds Motor Works.
- 1910 (Mar 21) – Thomas B. Jeffery dies while on vacation in Pompeii, Italy.
- 1910 (Jun 10) – Charles T. Jeffery incorporates the family's car business as a $3 million public stock company.
- 1914 – Charles T. Jeffery replaces the Rambler name with the Jeffery moniker in honor of Thomas B. Jeffery.
- 1915 – Charles T. Jeffery survives the sinking of the RMS Lusitania off the Irish coast.
