= Rambler (bicycle) =

American bicycle brand

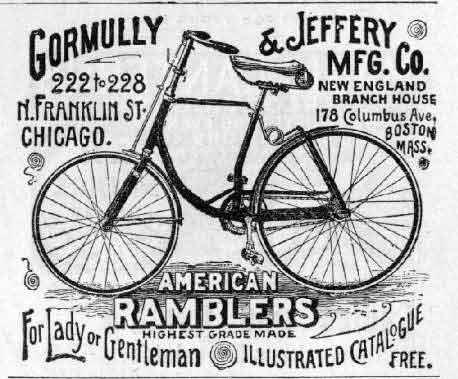
- 1891 Rambler advertisement
- Product type: Bicycle
- Produced by: Gormully & Jeffery (1878-1900); American Bicycle Company (from 1900)
- Country: United States
- Introduced: 1878
- Related brands: Rambler automobile

Rambler was an American bicycle brand manufactured by the Gormully & Jeffery Manufacturing Company (G&J) in Chicago from 1878 to 1900 and subsequently by the American Bicycle Company.

== History ==
The Rambler brand was created in 1878 by Thomas B. Jeffery, who co-founded G&J in Chicago with R. Philip Gormully. At the time, low prices often took precedence over quality but in manufacturing the Rambler, G&J used several more costly techniques, such as using brass-brazed joints instead of more common non-brazed welds, which improved the quality of the bicycle.

In 1897, Jeffery built his first Rambler automobile, a simple single cylinder car with bicycle wheels and a forerunner of the 1901 Rambler Model A.

Jeffery sold his stake in the successful bicycle company in 1900 to the American Bicycle Company to focus on automobiles after favorable responses to his exhibition of a $900 runabout at auto shows. At the time, G&J was the second-largest bicycle manufacturer in the US.

== Manufacturing ==
The Rambler's body featured flared metal tubing for extra strength at the joints, which were brazed by immersion in molten brass. These techniques continued even after Gormully & Jeffery and Rambler became brands of the American Bicycle Company.
