= Borg & Beck =

British automotive supplier

- Type: Private
- Industry: Automotive industry
- Founded: 1903; 123 years ago in Moline, Illinois, in the United States
- Founder: Charles Borg and Marshall Beck
- Headquarters: Banbury, Oxfordshire, United Kingdom
- Area served: worldwide
- Products: clutch, braking, steering, suspension, filters, cables, wheel bearings, cooling, turbo hoses
- Parent: First Line Ltd
- Divisions: Automotive Aftermarket

Borg & Beck is a British car parts company owned by First Line Ltd.

It was started as a tool company in Moline, Illinois, in the United States, by Charles Borg and Marshall Beck. In 1909 they invented the first practical sliding clutch. It merged with other companies in 1928 to become BorgWarner. In 1931, the Borg & Beck Company Limited was set up by Automotive Products in the UK to manufacture clutches under American patents from Borg & Beck in the USA. This allowed the company to sell British made Borg & Beck clutches in Great Britain, British Overseas Territories and the British Empire (except Canada).

The company was particularly successful in the UK, where, during the 1970s, over 85% of British-made vehicles had a Borg & Beck clutch fitted as OE. The Borg & Beck brand was purchased in 2006 by First Line Ltd. who supply over 40,000 products across 60 different product groups to the Automotive Aftermarket globally.
