= American Bicycle Company =

American manufacturer

- Company type: Trust
- Industry: Bicycle manufacturing
- Founded: 1899; 126 years ago
- Founder: Albert Augustus Pope
- Defunct: 1903

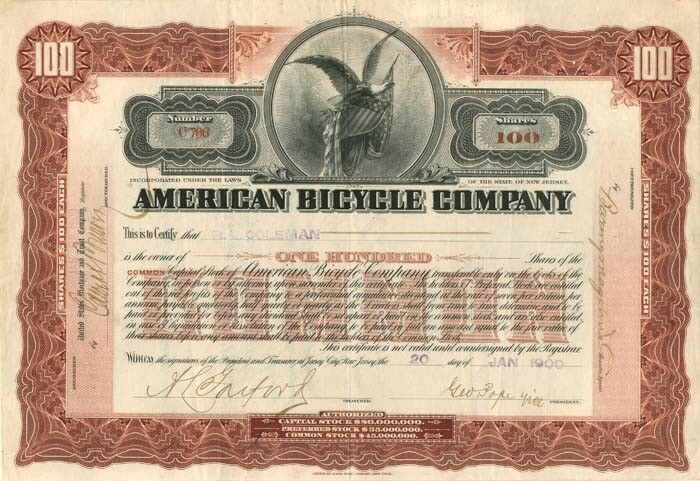
American Bicycle Company 100 shares of stock (January 20, 1900)

American Bicycle Company (1899-1903) was an American bicycle company (Trust) led by Albert Augustus Pope. The company was formed to consolidate the manufacturers of bicycles and bicycle parts. In the 1890s the advancements in bicycle design led to unprecedented demand for the new Safety bicycles. The "American Bicycle Company" trust only lasted for three years.

== Background ==
=== Early Bicycles ===
Early bicycles received the name Boneshakers because they were made of wood with hard wheels. Next was the "High Wheeler" also known as the Penny-farthing which was difficult and dangerous to ride.

=== Safety Bicycles ===
The Overman Wheel Company, founded 1882, was the first manufacturer of a safer bicycle in the United States: the design came to be known as a safety bicycle in the United States, in their factory complex in Chicopee, Massachusetts. During the 1880s there was great demand for bicycles because of the advancements in safety and design. One of the major advances which helped bicycles become popular were chain driven cycles with gears which allowed the bicycle to use smaller wheels. Inflatable rubber tires were also a great advancement which helped to make bicycles practical and possible.

The bicycle craze reached a peak in the 1890s when there were up to 4 million riders and 300 bicycle manufacturers.

== History ==
American Bicycle was founded by Albert Augustus Pope, owner of Columbia Bicycle. In 1898, the U.S. bicycle industry was caught in a downward spiral of market saturation, over-supply and intense price competition. Pope issued an affidavit stating that the American Bicycle Company was incorporated on May 12, 1899. In an attempt to control supply and limit competition, 42 manufacturers (later over 75 companies) formed the American Bicycle Company and soon afterwards announced plans to open a branch plant in Canada called the National Cycle Company.

=== Company failure ===
The American Bicycle Company only lasted a few years (from 1899 to 1903). Historians have not determined why the company failed but they have several theories. One idea was that the company was poorly organized, and another theory is that the various manufacturers involved in the company had different objectives. After the breakup the many different companies went back to competing.

One contributor to the end of the bicycle craze may have been the advent of combustion engines which were initially applied to 4-wheel carriages. In early 1900 the resulting "motor car" or "automobile" and large-scale, production-line manufacturing of affordable cars was underway in Lansing, Michigan. In the late 1890s and early 1900s manufacturers also installed engines on bicycles to create the first motorcycles.

=== Gormully & Jeffery ===
American Bicycle later bought the Gormully & Jeffery Manufacturing Company which made Rambler brand bicycles. Rambler bicycle was obtained in 1900 after Thomas B. Jeffery sold it to focus on the Rambler automobile.

== See also ==
- CCM (bicycle company)
