= Gaslight =

Gaslight may refer to:

- Gas light, light produced by burning gas
- Gas Light, a 1938 play by Patrick Hamilton
  - Gaslight (1940 film), starring Diana Wynyard, Anton Walbrook, and Frank Pettingell
  - Gaslight (1944 film), directed by George Cukor, starring Ingrid Bergman, Charles Boyer and Angela Lansbury
  - Gaslight (1958 film), starring Beverley Dunne
- Gaslighting, manipulating someone to make them question their reality, the theme of the 1938 play
- Gaslight (2023 film), an Indian Hindi-language film
- "Gaslight", a single by Willow from the album Lately I Feel Everything
- Gaslight (automobile), a defunct American automobile company (1960 – c. 1961)
- Gaslight Tavern, a club in Lawrence, Kansas
- The Gaslight Cafe, a club in Greenwich Village in New York

== See also ==
- Gaslamp (disambiguation)
- Gaslighter (disambiguation)
- Gaslit (disambiguation)
- Gaslight district (disambiguation)
- Gas Light and Coke Company
