= Gaslighter =

Gaslighter may refer to:

- Gas lighter, the igniter for a gas stove
- Gaslighter (album), a 2020 album by The Chicks
- Gaslighter (song), a 2020 song by The Chicks
- Someone who engages in gaslighting, manipulating a person into questioning their sanity

== See also ==
- Gaslamp (disambiguation)
- Gaslight (disambiguation)
- Gas lighting, artificial light produced by combusting gas
