= Gaslit =

Gaslit may refer to:

- Gaslit (film), a 2026 documentary film
- Gaslit (TV series), a 2022 political thriller about the Watergate scandal
- "Gaslit" (Gossip Girl episode), a 2010 episode of the CW television series
- Gas Lit, a 2021 album by the band Divide and Dissolve

== See also ==
- Gaslight (disambiguation)
