= Edward S. Jordan =

American entrepreneur (1882–1958)

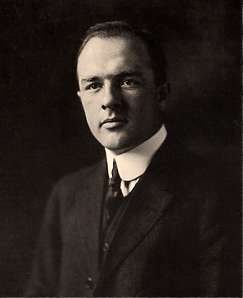
Edward S. "Ned" Jordan, ca. 1914

Jordan's "Red Arrow" emblem

Edward S. Jordan (November 21, 1882 – December 29, 1958) was an American entrepreneur, automotive industrialist and pioneer in evocative advertising copy, which he wrote and used to advertise the automobiles produced by his Jordan Motor Car Company of Cleveland, Ohio. Jordan’s June 1923 advertisement for the company’s Somewhere West of Laramie is considered a breakthrough in the art of writing advertising copy.

== Early years ==
Jordan was born in Merrill, Wisconsin in 1882, the only son in a family of six children. His mother, Kate Griffin Jordan, supported the family by running a series of small general stores along the Overland Trail.

== University ==
Jordan supported his own way through the University of Wisconsin–Madison and achieved high grades while working as a sports reporter for a Madison, Wisconsin newspaper and the Milwaukee Journal. He then joined the National Cash Register Company in Dayton, Ohio for a year, and in 1907 began a nine-year affiliation with the Thomas B. Jeffery Company in Kenosha, Wisconsin, manufacturers of the Rambler and the Jeffery automobile, where he served as secretary and manager of advertising, publicity and sales, and eventually as general manager. Jordan married Kenosha native Charlotte (Lottie) Hannahs on February 1, 1902 and the couple relocated to Cleveland, Ohio after 1906 where he was a reporter for the Cleveland Daily Press. Jordan also worked as a reporter for the Crowell-Collier Company of Springfield, Ohio, publisher of Collier's Magazine at this time.

After leaving Cleveland, Jordan came under the employment of John Patterson of National Cash Register Corporation of Dayton, Ohio. From Patterson, Jordan learned that success was built upon doing one thing a little better than anyone else. Patterson also added the caveat that the "Husband is only half sold until his wife is sold" on the item at hand.

== Family Ties ==
Charlotte Hannahs Jordan's family (The Hannahs Company made children's furniture at 1324-1330 52nd Street) had connections within Kenosha society, and it is believed by Jordan biographer James Lackey that she asked her family to make a contact with Thomas B. Jeffery about securing a position for her husband at Jeffery’s automobile company which produced the Rambler automobile in Kenosha. Upon arriving in Kenosha, Jordan was offered a position with the Jeffery concern.

In 1909, Thomas Jeffery died and the leadership of the company passed to his son Charles, who, in 1914, renamed the car the Jeffery in honor of his late father. While successful, Charles Jeffery decided to leave auto making in 1915, following a harrowing ordeal in the sinking of the RMS Lusitania. Jeffery’s wife had purchased a high-quality life preserver prior to her husband’s trip, and it saved his life. However the event also caused Jeffery to re-evaluate his life and priorities, and automaking wasn't one of them; he sold the Jeffery concern to Charles Nash, who renamed the concern the Nash Motors Company.

Nash extended an invitation to Jordan to stay on, but Jordan decided to pursue building his own type of car. According to Jordan, "Cars are too dull and drab." He reasoned that since people dressed smartly, they were willing to drive "smart-looking cars" as well.

== Entrepreneurial Venture ==
Using his position, Jordan arranged financing for the venture and chose Cleveland (where his father had lived as a child) as the manufacturing center for the car; outside of Detroit, Michigan, Cleveland had the greatest concentration of automakers and suppliers in the nation at the time. Cleveland’s position as a shipping and steel center as well as a finance center also weighed heavily in his decision. Jordan also selected a spacious home in East Cleveland, Ohio on Grandview Terrace to which he could retreat when the pressures of running the company became too great.

== Assembled Automobiles ==
Jordan decided that the vehicles built by his Jordan Motor Car Company would be an "assembled" car - that is to say that Jordan would build the cars but not manufacture the vehicle parts from scratch. Instead, it would rely upon the best standardized components available. Jordan also decided that he would outsource the production of components that were unique to his cars and designed by his engineers. While this raised the cost of each Jordan built, Ned Jordan’s target market was not one in which price mattered much. He managed to raise $200,000 within a day to start the Jordan company.

From the first, the Jordan was a success for a car of its type. While production never exceeded 10,000 per year, given the type of operation and the intended market, Ned Jordan and his products were an instant hit, especially with women. Jordan bet that in the upper-class car markets, women would be drawn to fine upholstery, richly detailed interiors, as well as a wide array of body types and colors.

One engineering hallmark that all Jordan vehicles were known for were their suspension systems, which were supple but without sacrificing stability or handling. Designed by Russell Begg, the system used oversized vanadium steel half-elliptical springs. The design also did away with a soft suspension's tendency to sway. Jordan advertised that system as the lightest of its type and unabashedly "the best on the road."

== Advertising Mind ==
However it was Jordan’s flair for turning a phrase that raised his cars above the din of makes that were available to consumers in the 1920s. Automotive writer Beverly Kimes states in the Standard Catalog of American Cars 1805-1946 that "there had to be a Jordan (automobile) if for no other reason than to allow Ned Jordan the unfettered license in the prose that he chose to extol it. And how the man could write, lyrically, romantically, emotionally."

While major automobile companies wouldn't embrace automotive styling as a major factor in their cars until the arrival of the LaSalle in 1927, advertising for all automobiles to 1922 was based on extolling the benefits and features of the automobiles themselves. Ned Jordan took another path - towards evocative advertising copy. Jordan’s style and wording captured the feeling of the restless "lost generation" that F. Scott Fitzgerald would gain fame from writing about. The ad that changed the automobile advertising world did so through sweeping prose and lack of detail about the car itself.

Appearing in the June, 1923 edition of the Saturday Evening Post, the ad promoted the Jordan Playboy, with art by Fred Cole showing a car driven by a cloche-wearing flapper hunkered down behind the wheel in abstract fashion, racing a cowboy and the clouds.

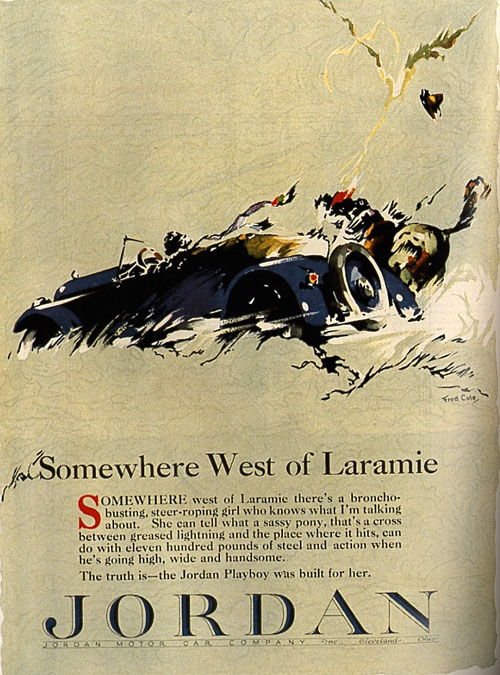
Somewhere West of Laramie advertisement for the Jordan Playboy

"SOMEWHERE west of Laramie there's a bronco-busting girl who knows what I’m talking about.
"She can tell what a sassy pony, that’s a cross between greased lighting and the place where it hits, can do with eleven hundred pounds of steel and action when he's going high, wide and handsome.
"The truth is - the Playboy was built for her.
"Built for the lass whose face is brown with the sun when the day is done of revel and romp and race.
"She loves the cross of the wild and the tame.
"There's a savor of links about that car - of laughter and lilt and light - a hint of old loves - and saddle and quirt. It’s a brawny thing - yet a graceful thing for the sweep o' the Avenue.
"Step into the Playboy when the hour grows dull with things gone dead and stale.
"Then start for the land of real living with the spirit of the lass who rides, lean and rangy, into the red horizon of a Wyoming twilight."

== Compact Luxury Car ==
For Jordan and his company, 1926 was the best year of his life. His family was doing well, his cars were selling even better than they had in 1925. However Jordan made one calculated move that set the stage for his automobile company's failure when he introduced the ill-conceived 1927 Jordan Little Custom the first "compact" luxury automobile. With the Jordan Little Custom, Jordan guessed incorrectly that American car buyers would spend as much money for a well-appointed car that was compact and European in size. Had he attempted his gamble sixty years later perhaps he could have succeeded, but in 1927, Jordan couldn't give the cars away.

Jordan automobile production continued through 1931, but as losses from Little Custom mounted Jordan Motor Car bankers who held the liens assumed more of the daily control of the company. Both Jordan and his wife began selling off their stock shares in 1927 after the Little Custom failed. As the situation became more and more dire, Jordan and his wife still had their personal fortunes, but neither was willing to plow their own money into the company to save it.

As the auto company that he built began to strain under the weight of unsold cars, Jordan’s marriage was also heading for divorce. The couple, who had one son Jack, and two daughters Joan and Jane, ended the marriage in early 1930. Publicly the separation was amicable, but Jordan was bitter about the divorce, causing a strain between himself and his now adult children.

== Collapse of the Company ==
The tottering Jordan Automobile Company produced the magnificent Speedway Ace model at the start of the 1930s, a model which is today considered a full classic car. But the company collapsed in 1931, and after a short stint on Madison Avenue in advertising, Jordan headed for the Caribbean where he descended into alcoholism. Jordan regained sobriety before the start of World War II, returned to the United States, remarried and started a second family. He joined the McArthur Corporation, maker of military aircraft seats, between 1935 and 1945, and later joined the McArthur Advertising Corporation in New York. By 1950 he began writing "Ned Jordan Speaks" for Automotive News, where he reminisced about the automobile industry. At the time of his death he was survived by four children.

== Death ==
Ned Jordan died in New York City on December 29, 1958. Per James Lackey, Jordan's body was cremated and given to his daughter Jane Jordan Rogers for disbursement.
