= Gaslight district =

A gaslight district is an urbanized region lit by or formerly lit by gas lighting using gas lamps for street lighting lamps.

Gaslight District or gas-light district may also refer to:

== Places ==
- Gaslight District, Petoskey, Michigan, USA; a neighborhood
- Gaslight District, Clifton, Cincinnati, Ohio, USA; a neighborhood
- Gaslight Square, St. Louis, Missouri, USA; a neighborhood
- Gaslamp Quarter, San Diego, California, USA; a neighborhood

== Television ==
- The Gaslight District, an animated series by Nick Szopko produced by Glitch Productions

== See also ==
- Gaslight (disambiguation)
