= Gaslight (automobile) =

Defunct American motor vehicle manufacturer

The Gaslight was an automobile manufactured in Detroit, Michigan by the Gaslight Motors Company from 1960-c.1961. The Gaslight was a venture that built a replica-style veteran car, based on the 1902 Rambler. It was built with a modern air-cooled single-cylinder engine of 4 hp (3.0 kW). The vehicle had a 77-inch (2,000 mm) wheelbase, and weighed 640 lb (290 kg). It sold for $1,495.

== See also ==
- List of defunct United States automobile manufacturers
