= Jordan Motor Car Company =

Former american car manufacturer

Jordan Motor Car Company, Inc.
- Jordan Motor Car Company "Red Arrow" emblem
- Trade name: Jordan Motor Car Company
- Company type: Corporation
- Industry: Automotive
- Predecessor: Jordan Motor Car Company (1916-1919); Jordan Motor Car Company, Inc. (1919-1931)
- Founded: 1916; 110 years ago
- Founder: Edward S. Jordan
- Headquarters: Cleveland, Ohio, United States
- Products: Automobiles

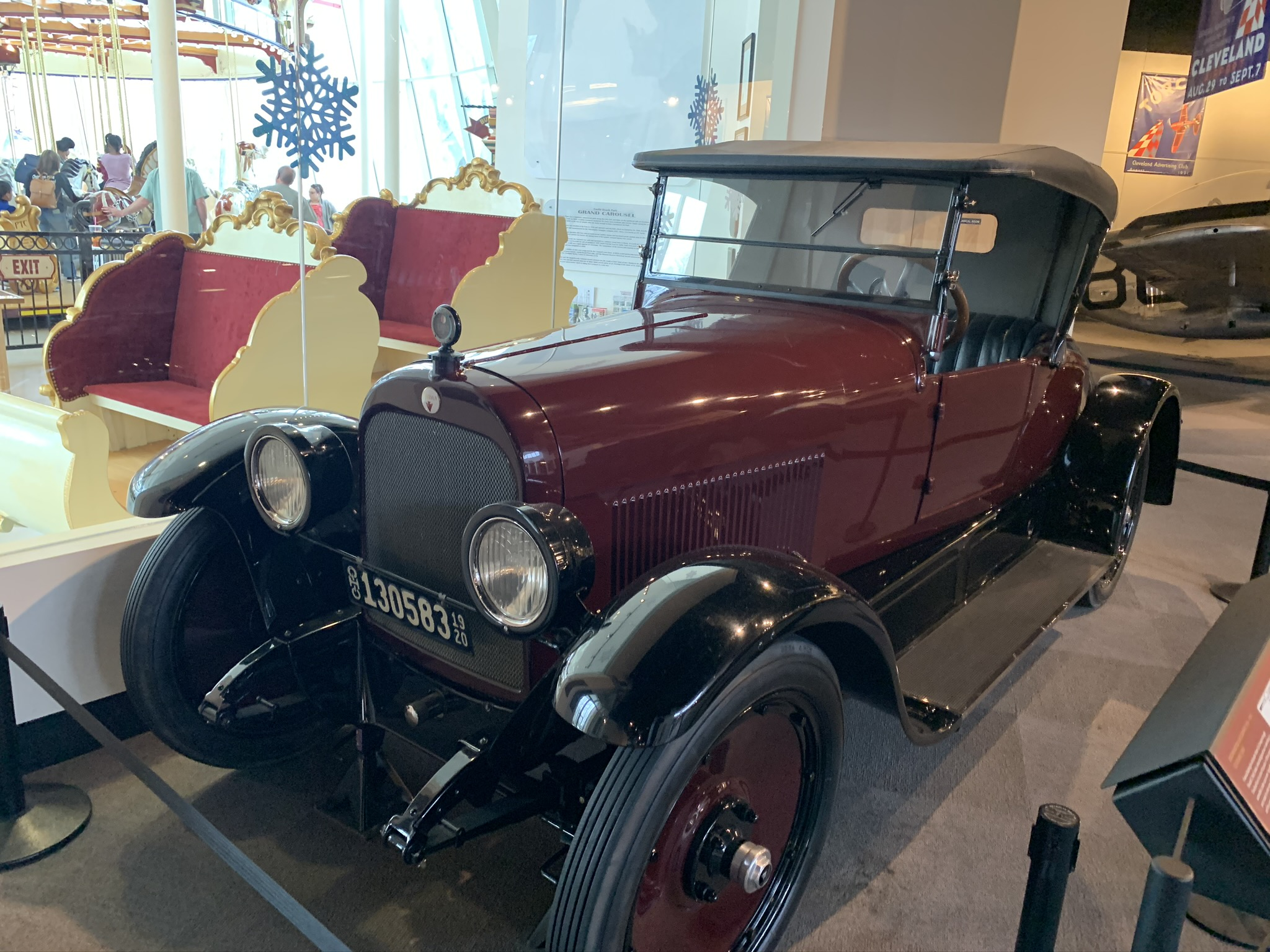
1920 Jordan Playboy at Crawford Auto-Aviation Museum

The Jordan Motor Car Company was founded in 1916 in Cleveland, Ohio by Edward S. "Ned" Jordan, a former advertising executive from Thomas B. Jeffery Company of Kenosha, Wisconsin. The factory produced what were known as "assembled cars" until 1931, using components from other manufacturers. Jordan cars were noted more for attractive styling than for advanced engineering, although they did bring their share of innovations to the marketplace. The company's advertising was often more original than the cars themselves; said Jordan, "Cars are too dull and drab." He reasoned that since people dressed smartly, they were willing to drive "smart looking cars" as well.

== Establishment in Cleveland ==
Jordan Motor Car established its plant east of downtown Cleveland at 1070 East 152nd Street in the Collinwood neighborhood along the Nickel Plate Railroad tracks. This not only provided an ideal location for shipping the finished cars but also provided Jordan with ready access to out-of-area suppliers. The plant was built in two stages: the first 30,000-square-foot (2,800 m^{2}) building was begun on April 5, 1916 and finished some seven weeks later, while the second addition was completed within months of the first structure. In their first year of production (1916), Jordan sold over one thousand vehicles.

== Manufacturing Methods ==
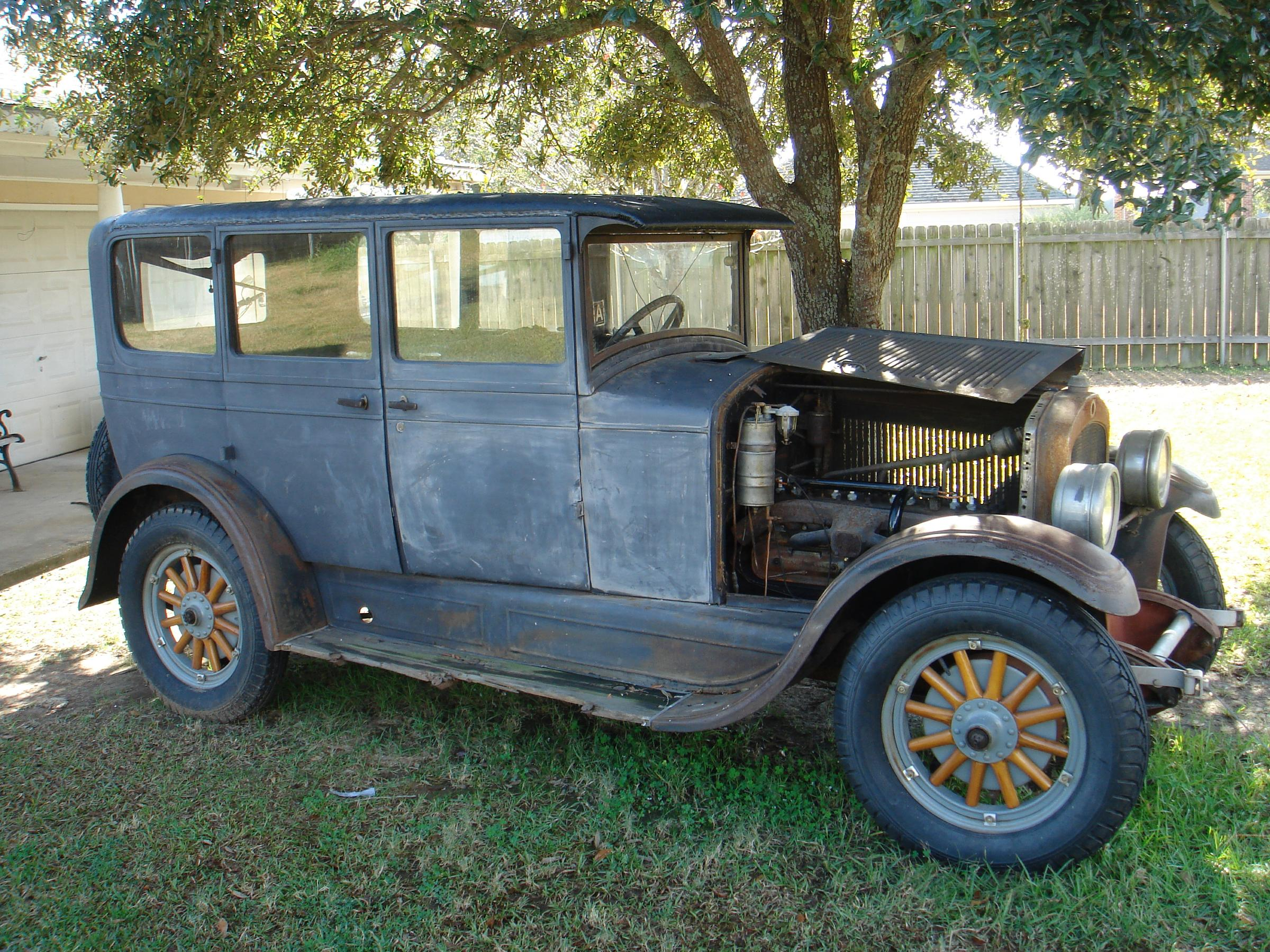
A 1928 Jordan Sedan prior to restoration work

The Jordan was an "assembled automobile", with parts obtained from outside vendors. The cars were powered by Continental engines, used Timken axles, Bijur starters and Bosch ignitions. According to Ned Jordan's biographer, James Lackey, the source of early Jordan bodies was somewhat a mystery. While Jordan had the capacity to paint the automobile bodies, attach them to the chassis and outfit the passenger compartment, the facility was unable to fabricate the bodies themselves. Later production bodies were shipped from a variety of manufacturers in Ohio and Massachusetts, fabricated from aluminum.

While most automobile producers limited themselves to a single color combination and Ford relied exclusively on the fast-drying Japan Black lacquer which cured in a matter of hours, Jordan automobiles were available in three colors of red - "Apache Red", "Mercedes Red", and "Savage Red"- as well as "Ocean Sand Gray", "Venetian Green", "Briarcliff Green", "Egyptian Bronze", "Liberty Blue" and "Chinese Blue". Black was also available. The most-flamboyant of color schemes was on the four-passenger Sport model, which could be ordered in "Submarine Gray", with khaki top and orange wheels.

Details given the cars were unusually advanced for an independently made assembled car; for example, Jordans boasted one of the first cowl fresh-air ventilation systems. Jordan also went to all-steel construction in the mid-1920s, some ten years before Buick and eight years before Chrysler introduced the advanced Airflow models.

In 1917, Jordan's 60 Series Limousine had a 6-cylinder, 303.1-cubic-inch Continental engine. Jordan purchased and installed straight-six engines for its 1919 Series F and 1920-1921 Series M cars. In 1922, the Series MX model featured a 246-cubic-inch, six-cylinder flathead engine. In 1926, their Line Eight and Great Line Eight models offered, corresponding to their names, eight-cylinder engines. The 1931 Model 90 was powered by an eight-cylinder, 85-horsepower engine.

== Jordan marketing ==
Jordan was also one of the first automakers to christen its model types with unique, evocative names, such as the Sport Marine (with "fashionably low" 32×4-inch {81×10 cm} wheels, it was "essentially a woman's car"), Tomboy, and Playboy. He originally wanted to name the car with the World War I term "Doughboy," but decided on the common-sensical-but-provocative Playboy instead. In 1920, the company issued the Friendly Three coupe, with the slogan "Seats two, three if they're friendly".

Jordan used the suburbs of Cleveland Heights and Shaker Heights as backdrops for his advertising photographs, setting the cars in front of the mansions of Overlook and South Park Drives.

Appearing in the June, 1923 edition of the Saturday Evening Post, the ad promoted the Jordan Playboy in art by Fred Cole, driven by a cloche hat wearing flapper hunkered down behind the wheel in abstract fashion, racing a cowboy and the clouds.

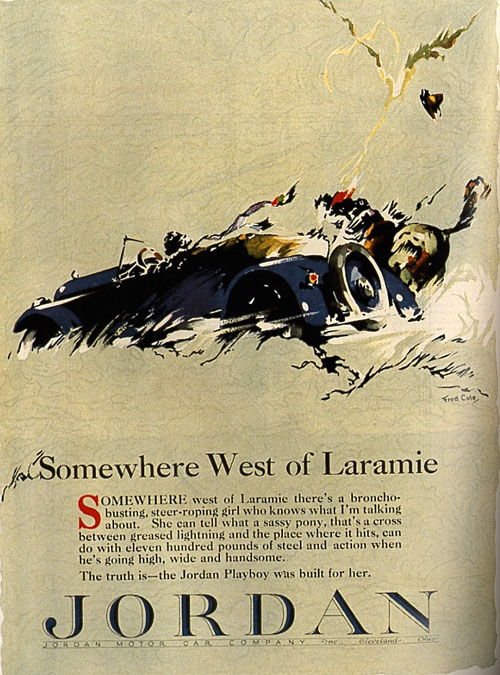
"Somewhere West of Laramie" advertisement for the Jordan Playboy

:

SOMEWHERE west of Laramie there's a bronco-busting, steer-roping girl who knows what I’m talking about. She can tell what a sassy pony, that’s a cross between greased lighting and the place where it hits, can do with eleven hundred pounds of steel and action when he's going high, wide and handsome. The truth is - the Playboy was built for her. Built for the lass whose, face is brown with the sun when the day is done of revel and romp and race. She loves the cross of the wild and the tame. There's a savor of links about that car - of laughter and lilt and light - a hint of old loves - and saddle and quirt. It’s a brawny thing - yet a graceful thing for the sweep o' the Avenue. Step into the Playboy when the hour grows dull with things gone dead and stale. Then start for the land of real living with the spirit of the lass who rides, lean and rangy, into the red horizon of a Wyoming twilight.

While other Jordan ads contained the same winsome prose, one in particular had an unseen outcome: Jordan's "Port of Missing Men", which also appeared in the Saturday Evening Post (1920), featured Jordan's musings on restless men and those places where they travel to when they needed to get away. The ad featured art work showing a Jordan Playboy in front of a cottage in winter by the sea, with a young boy walking by, looking up to the second story window aglow red from within.

Jordan wrote to the editor of the Post:

We regret that our recent advertisement has offended your high moral sense... perhaps had we placed lights in the downstairs windows as well, the suggestive implications would have been minimized.

== Final years of production (1927-1931) ==
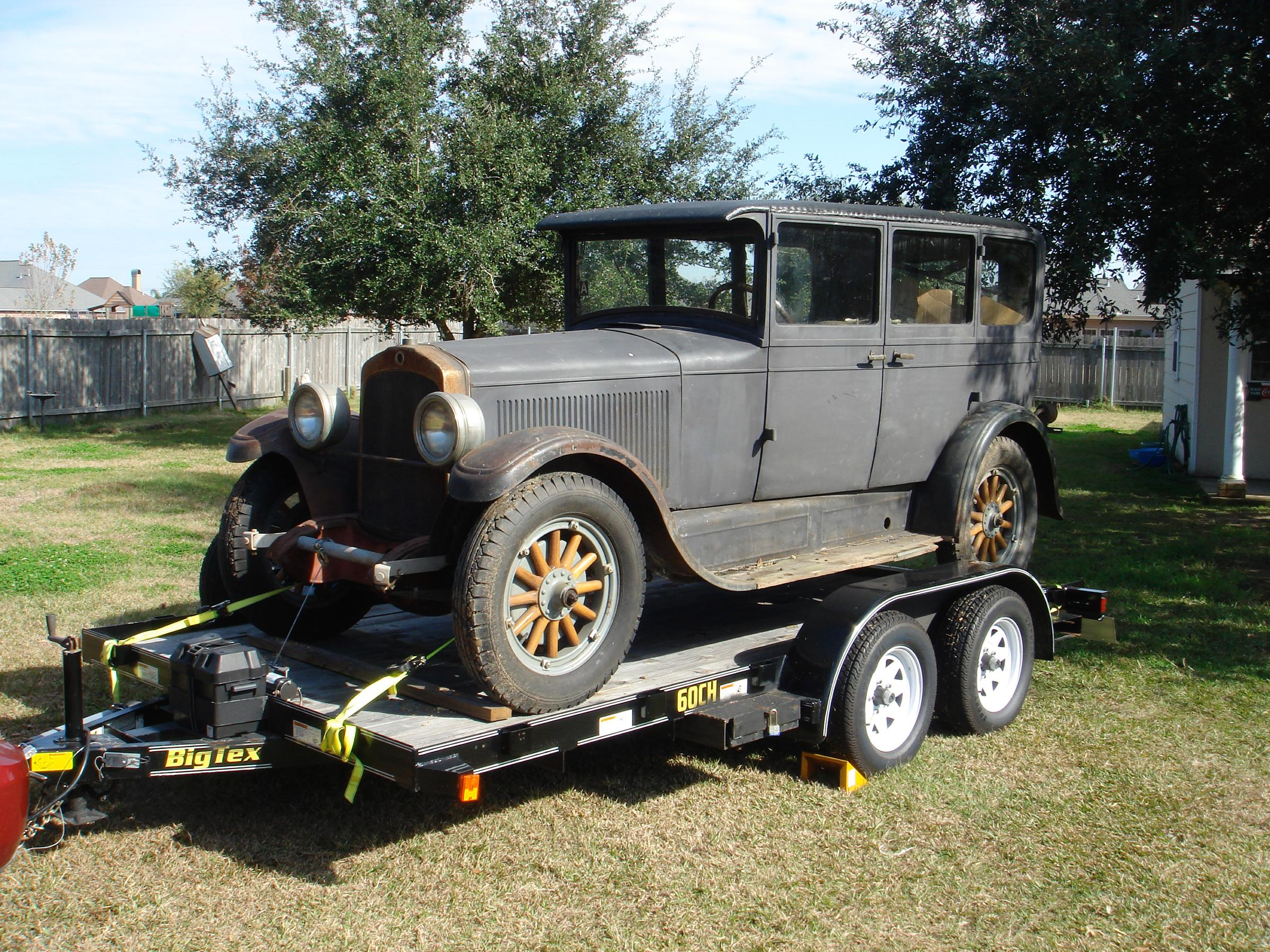
Another view of a 1928 Jordan Sedan, prior to restoration work

In 1927, the firm introduced its only significant misstep: the Little Custom, a luxury compact. Not only did consumers ignore the car but its financial drain on the company was a leading factor in the takeover by bankers of JMC, leaving Ned Jordan as the company’s titular head. Both Jordan and his wife began divesting their interests in the company in 1928.

The company survived the stock market crash of 1929, but with intense competition among the many US automakers then extant, and personal problems besetting Ned Jordan, the company ceased production in 1931.

The true total production of Jordan cars is unclear; some sources list the total amount as high as over 100,000 units, while other sources list the production as low as 30,000.

Annual production of the Jordan is indicated below (sourced from "The Standard Catalog of American Cars 1805-1932, 3rd edition):

Year	Units
1917	1,788
1918	5,713
1919	3,218
1920	7,817
1921	8,913
1922	4,167
1923	6,691
1924	6,159
1925	6,531
1926	8,469
1927	6,357
1928	7,386
1929	4,323
1930	985
1931	263
Total	78,780

== See also ==
- List of defunct United States automobile manufacturers
- List of automobiles
