= George Edward Kimball =

American journalist

George Edward Kimball III
- Born: December 20, 1943; Grass Valley, California, U.S.
- Died: July 6, 2011 (aged 67); New York
- Occupations: Author, Journalist
- Spouse: Marjorie Ostrow Seeger Marash
- Children: Darcy Maeve Kimball, George Edward Kimball IV
- Parent(s): George E. Kimball II, Sue Laslie

George E. Kimball III (December 20, 1943 – July 6, 2011) was an American author and journalist who spent 25 years as a sports columnist for the Boston Herald before retiring in 2005. Considered one of the foremost boxing writers of his era, he is the author of Four Kings: Leonard, Hagler, Hearns, Duran, and the Last Great Era of Boxing (2008) and "Manly Art: They can run -- but they can't hide" (2011). In collaboration with John Schulian, he edited two anthologies, "At The Fights: American Writers on Boxing" (2011) and "The Fighter Still Remains: A Celebration of Boxing in Poetry and Song from Ali to Zevon" (2010). Since 1997 he had written the weekly ‘America at Large’ column for The Irish Times in Dublin, Ireland, and had contributed to a number of boxing websites.

== Youth and education ==
The son of a career Army officer, Kimball was born in Grass Valley, California, but lived all over the world as a boy, including in Taiwan and Germany. After graduating from high school in San Antonio, Texas, he attended the University of Kansas, and later the Iowa Writer's Workshop. He became increasingly involved in the counterculture of the late 1960s, and although he had originally attended college on a Naval ROTC scholarship, later in the decade his participation in the antiwar movement led to several arrests.

== Early career ==
In the late 1960s Kimball (with John Fowler—whose Abington Book Shop was right next to (east of) the Gaslight Tavern on Oread in Lawrence, KS—and Charles Plymell) was an editor for the influential Midwestern magazine Grist before moving to New York, where he was heavily involved in the literary scene revolving around the Poetry Project at St. Mark's-in-the-Bouwerie and the Lion's Head saloon in Greenwich Village. After working at the Scott Meredith Literary Agency in New York, Kimball returned to Kansas in 1970, where he waged a colorful campaign from the Gaslight for the office of Douglas County sheriff. As a freelance writer he contributed to diverse publications such as The Paris Review, Rolling Stone, The Realist, and Scanlan’s Monthly, and his novel, Only Skin Deep, was published in 1968. In the early 1970s he was also an editor for the Cambridge (Mass.) literary journal Ploughshares.

== Journalistic career ==
In early 1972 Kimball became the sports editor of the Boston Phoenix, and for nearly a decade there worked on a Phoenix staff that at various times included Joe Klein, Jon Landau, Janet Maslin, Curt Raymond, Sidney Blumenthal and David Denby, while nurturing the early careers of fellow sportswriters Mike Lupica, Michael Gee, and Charles P. Pierce.

In 1980, he became a columnist for The Herald, where for a quarter century he covered major sporting events around the world, including Super Bowls and World Series, NBA Finals, and the Olympic Games, golf's four majors and Ryder Cups, Wimbledon, and the America's Cup yacht races. He covered nearly 400 world title fights, and was the 1985 recipient of the Nat Fleischer Award for Excellence in Boxing Journalism. Kimball also received ‘Best Column’ awards from the Boxing Writers Association of America, the Golf Writers Association of America, Boston Magazine, and United Press International.

== Books ==
- Only Skin Deep. Olympia/Ophelia. 1968. OCLC 12076769.
- Sunday’s Fools: stomped, tromped, kicked, and chewed in the NFL. Houghton Mifflin. 1974. ISBN 978-0-395-19952-7. (with Tom Beer)
- Chairman of the Boards, Masters of the Mile—Red Rock Press, Dublin (2008) (with Eamonn Coghlan)
- American at Large. Dublin: Red Rock Press. 2008. ISBN 978-0-954-86536-8. (introduction by George Foreman)
- Four Kings: Leonard, Hagler, Hearns, Duran and the Last Great Era of Boxing. McBooks Press. 2008. ISBN 978-1-590-13162-6. (foreword by Pete Hamill). London/Edinburgh: Mainstream Publishing (July 1, 2008) ISBN 978-1-845-96359-0
- The Fighter Still Remains: A Celebration of Boxing in Poetry and Song from Ali to Zevon. Fore Angels Press/DiBella Entertainment. June 1, 2010. ISBN 978-0-979-99475-3. (with John Schulian)
- At The Fights: American Writers on Boxing. The Library of America. March 3, 2011. ISBN 978-1-598-53092-6. (with John Schulian and Colum McCann)
- Manly Art (They can run—but they can't hide). McBooks Press. April 1, 2011. ISBN 978-1-590-13596-9. London/Dublin: Transworld Ireland, 2011. ISBN 978-1-848-27136-4

=== Anthologies ===
- The New Olympia Reader
- The World Anthology
- Baseball Diamonds
- Baseball’s Finest
- Come Out Writing
- Impossible Dreams
- A Commonwealth of Golfers
- Rolling Stone Record Review
- Patriots Day

=== Forewords ===
- Football’s Blackest Hole by Craig Parker
- The Regulation of Boxing: a history and comparative analysis of policies among American states by Robert Rodriguez

== Broadcast career ==
Beginning in the mid-1980s, Kimball served as a regular co-host for several sports talk radio programs in the Boston area, as a television analyst for boxing broadcasts on the Fox SportsNet and Comcast networks, and as a panelist for several PBS programs produced by WGBH-TV. He appeared (as a boxing writer covering a fight between Woody Harrelson and Antonio Banderas) in Ron Shelton's 1999 film “Play it to the Bone.”

== Family ==
Kimball was married to Sarah Kimball, the mother of his two grown children, Darcy Maeve Kimball and George Edward Kimball IV until their divorce in 2002. In 2004, in a ceremony officiated by former heavyweight champion George Foreman, Kimball married New York psychiatrist Marge Marash. The couple lived in New York City.

Kimball was diagnosed with cancer in 2005, and died from the disease in 2011 at age 67.
