= Rambler (automobile) =

Automobile brand name

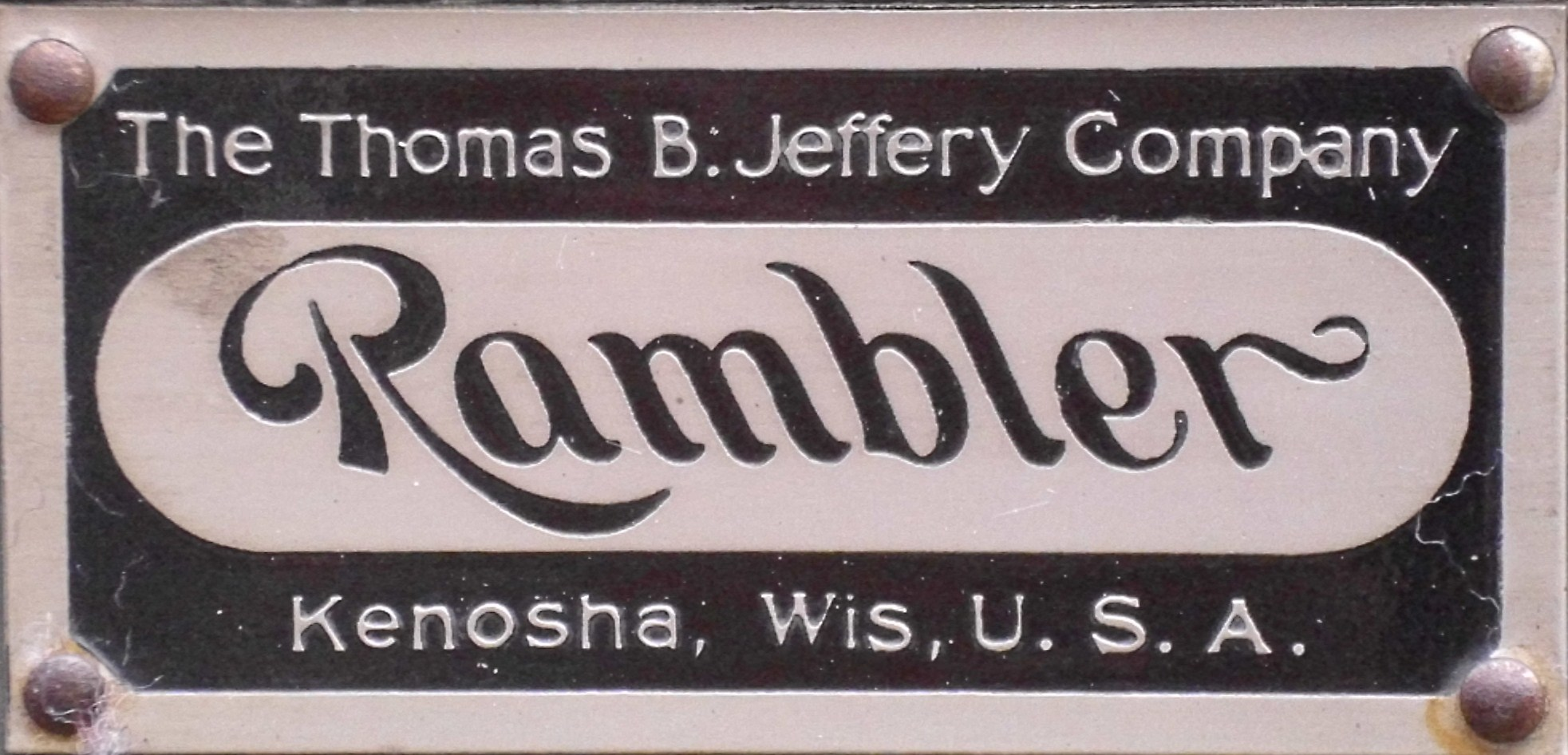
- Founded: September 27, 1897; 128 years ago
- Defunct: June 15, 1983; 42 years ago

Rambler is an automobile brand name that was first used by the Thomas B. Jeffery Company between 1900 and 1914.

Charles W. Nash bought Jeffery in 1916, and Nash Motors reintroduced the name to the automobile marketplace from 1950 through 1954. The "Rambler" trademark registration for use on automobiles and parts was issued on 9 March 1954 for Nash-Kelvinator.

Nash merged with the Hudson Motor Car Company to form American Motors Corporation (AMC) in 1954. The Rambler line of cars continued through the 1969 model year in the United States and 1983 in international markets.

Rambler cars were often nicknamed the "Kenosha Cadillac" after the original location and their most significant place of manufacture in the city of Kenosha, Wisconsin. Cadillac is an unrelated luxury car brand, but Nash and Rambler cars became known for quality construction and numerous features, leading some to the label as a affordable higher level car made in Kenosha.

== Rambler 1897–1914 ==
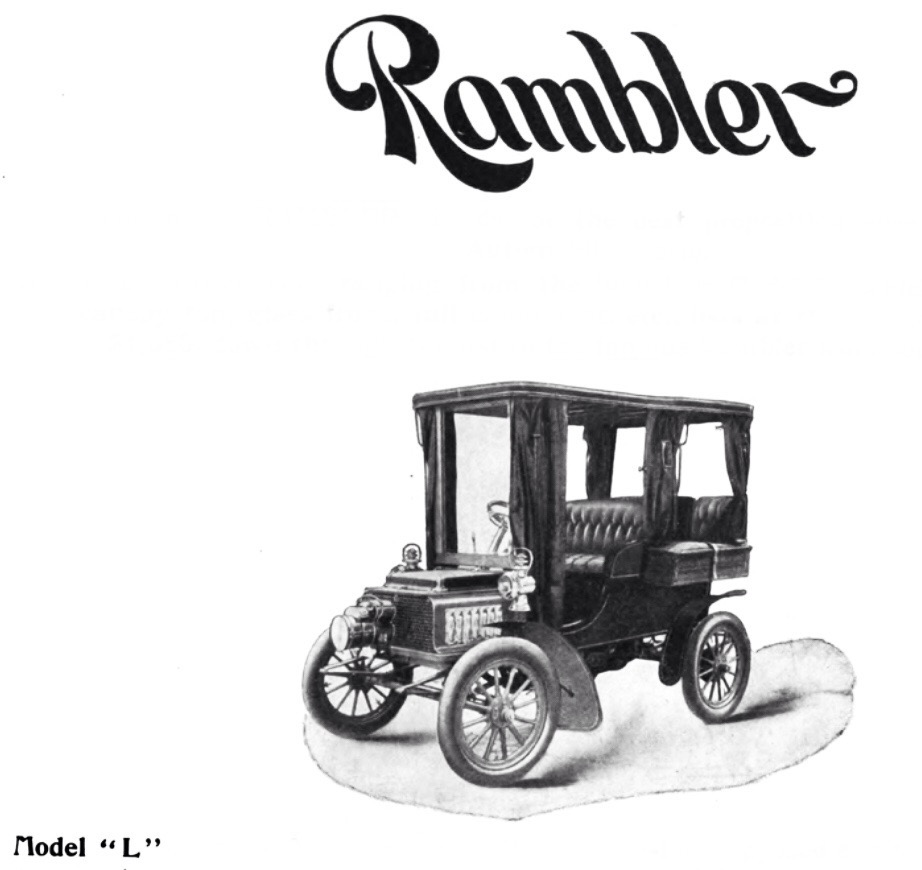
Rambler Model L (1904)

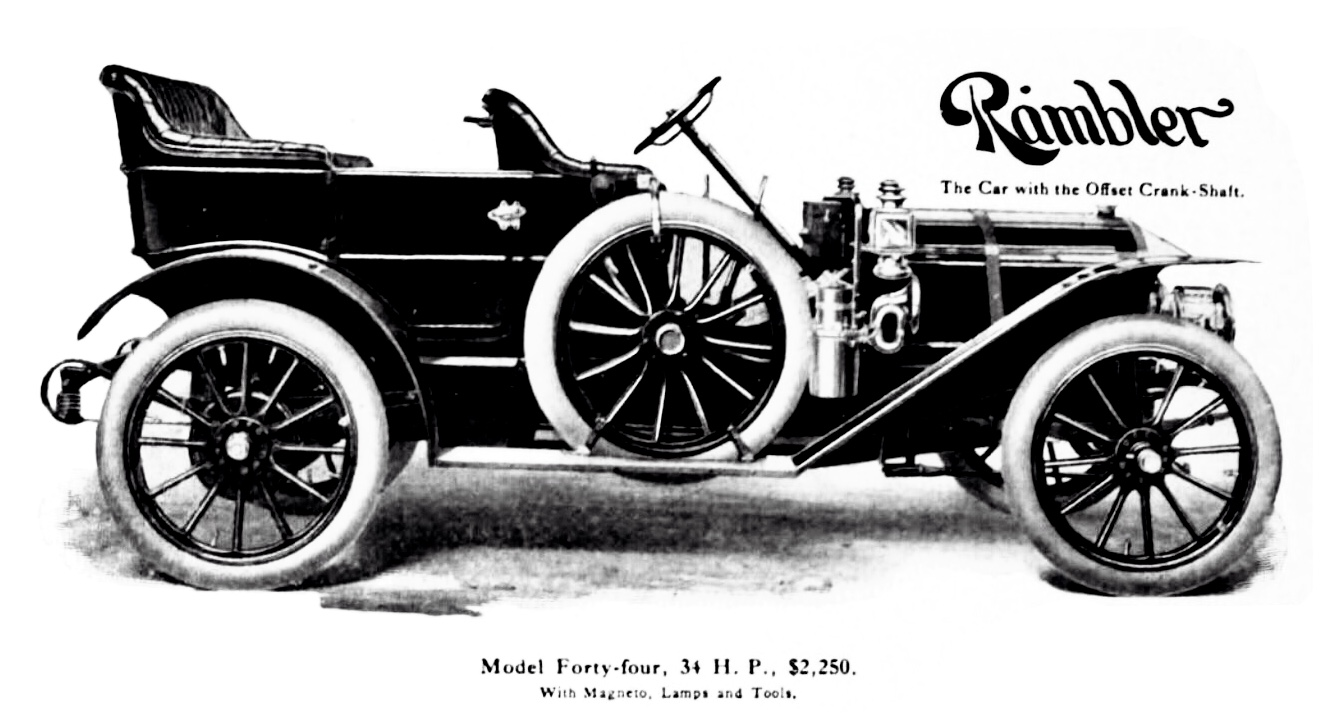
Rambler Model forty-four (1909)

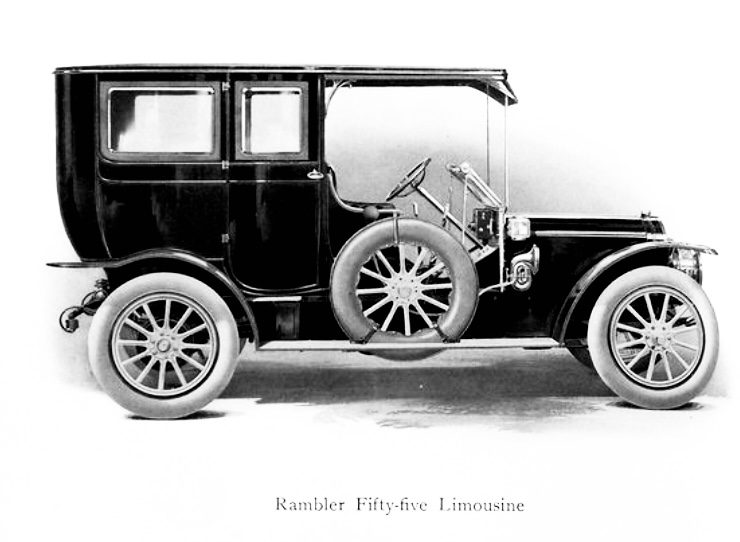
Rambler Model 55 Limousine (1910)

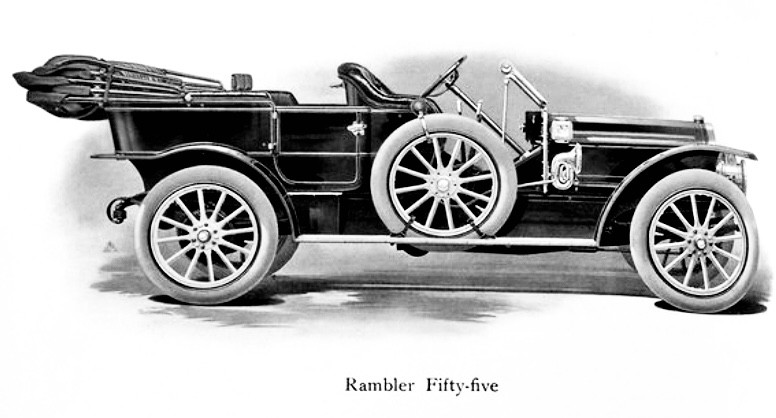
Rambler Model 55 Touring (1910) Wheel-Base 123 inches

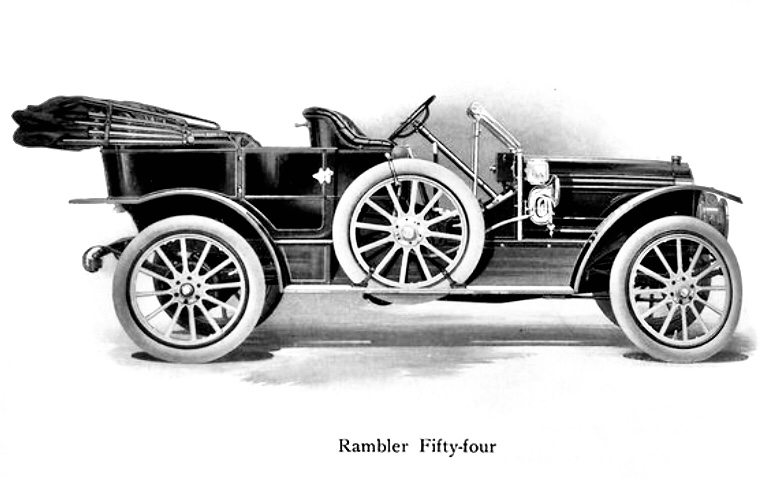
Rambler Model 54 Touring (1910) Wheel-Base 117 inches

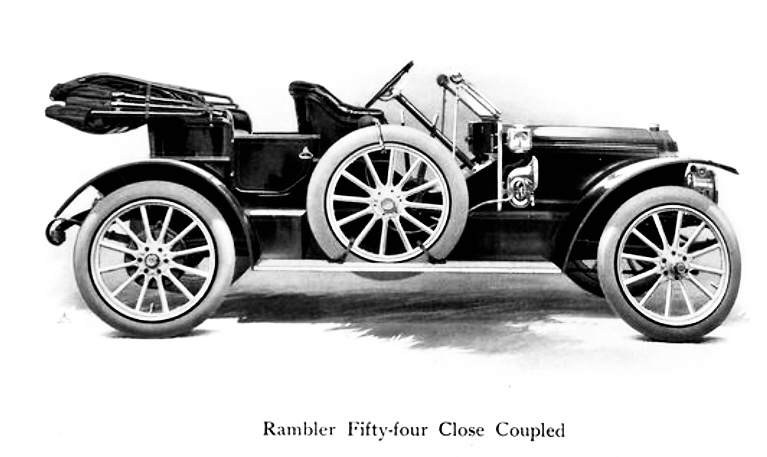
Rambler Model 54 Close Coupled (1910)

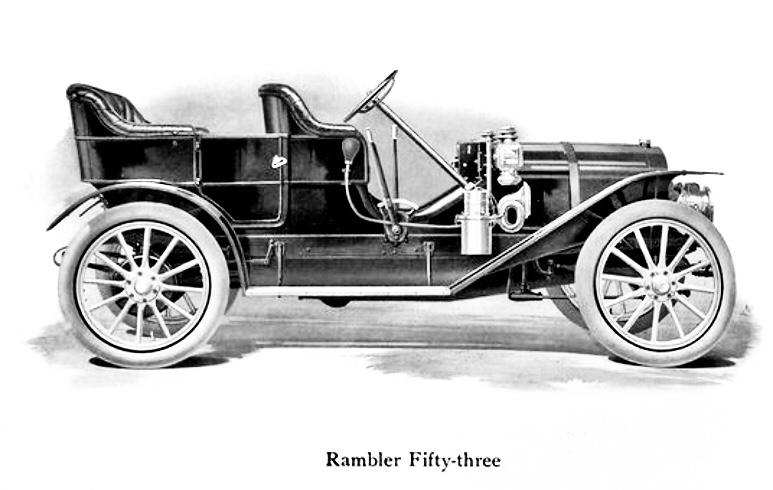
Rambler Model 53 (1910)

The first use of the name Rambler for an American-made automobile dates to 1897 when Thomas B. Jeffery of Chicago, Illinois, builder of the Rambler bicycle, constructed his prototype automobile.

After receiving positive reviews at the 1899 Chicago International Exhibition & Tournament and the first National Automobile Show in New York City, Jeffery entered the automobile business. Following the sudden death of his Rambler partner, R. Philip Gormully, Jeffery sold their bicycle business to the American Bicycle Company, but retained rights to the Rambler name. In 1900, he bought the old Sterling Bicycle Co. factory in Kenosha, Wisconsin, and set up shop.

Thomas Jeffery and his son Charles experimented with such early technical innovations as a steering wheel (as opposed to a tiller), left-hand driving and the engine placement under a hood instead of under the seat, but they was decided that such features were too advanced for the motoring public of the day. The first Ramblers were tiller-steered, had right-hand drive, and the single-cylinder engine was positioned under the seat. Rambler innovated various design features and was the first to equip cars with a spare wheel-and-tire assembly. This allowed the driver, when experiencing a flat tire, to exchange the spare wheel and tire for the flat one, rather than patching.

Jeffery started commercially mass-producing automobiles in 1902. By the end of the year the company had produced 1,500 motor cars, priced at US$750 (equivalent to $27,909 in 2025), one-sixth of all cars that were manufactured in the U.S. during that year. The Thomas B. Jeffery Company was the second largest auto manufacturer at that time, behind Oldsmobile.

In 1904, Jeffery built 2,342 Ramblers. Higher-powered two-cylinder versions with front-mounted engines and steering wheels were now available. In 1905, the single-cylinder was discontinued, and three larger two-cylinder models priced from $1,200 to $3,000 were offered (equivalent to between US$43,000 and $107,000 in 2025). A Rambler four-cylinder was introduced in 1906.

New employee Edward S, Jordan, who would later become Jeffery's secretary and general manager, provided advertising copy such as "The Right Car at the Right Price", “June Time Is Rambler Time”, and other similarly evocative phrases. By 1906, Rambler was considered an industry leader, with one of the best-equipped automobile factories. Thomas Jeffery was not interested in increasing mass production, however, and settled into a pattern of producing 2,500 Ramblers a year.

In 1910, all Ramblers were now four-cylinder medium-priced cars. While on vacation in 1910, Thomas B. Jeffery died of a heart attack and his son Charles took over the newly incorporated Thomas B. Jeffery Company. Charles increased annual production by about 500 cars and, in 1912, introduced new Ned Jordan model names such as Cross Country, Country Club, Knickerbocker, and Valkyrie. For 1913 the last Rambler branded models were the Cross Country roadster and touring car, an Inside Drive coupe and the Gotham Limousine, priced from US$1,650 to $2,750 (equivalent to between US$54,000 and $90,000 in 2025).

In 1914, Charles T. Jeffery, Thomas B. Jeffery's son, replaced the Rambler brand name with Jeffery in honor of his now-deceased father.

In 1916, the Thomas B. Jeffery Company was purchased by Charles W. Nash and became Nash Motors Company in 1917. The Jeffery brand name was dropped at the time of the sale. The manufacture of Nash-branded automobiles commenced. In 1937, the concern became the Nash-Kelvinator Corporation through a merger with the major appliance maker.

== Overview of production figures ==
Year	Production
1901	2
1902	1,500
1903	3,693
1904	2,343
1905	3,807
1906	6,299
1907	?
1908	1,597
1909	1,963
1910	2,243
1911	3,000
1912	3,550
1913	?
1950	21,674
1951	59,702
1952	53,000
1953	41,825
1954	37,779
1955	83,852
1956	79,162
1957	109,178
1958	217,332
1959	401,422

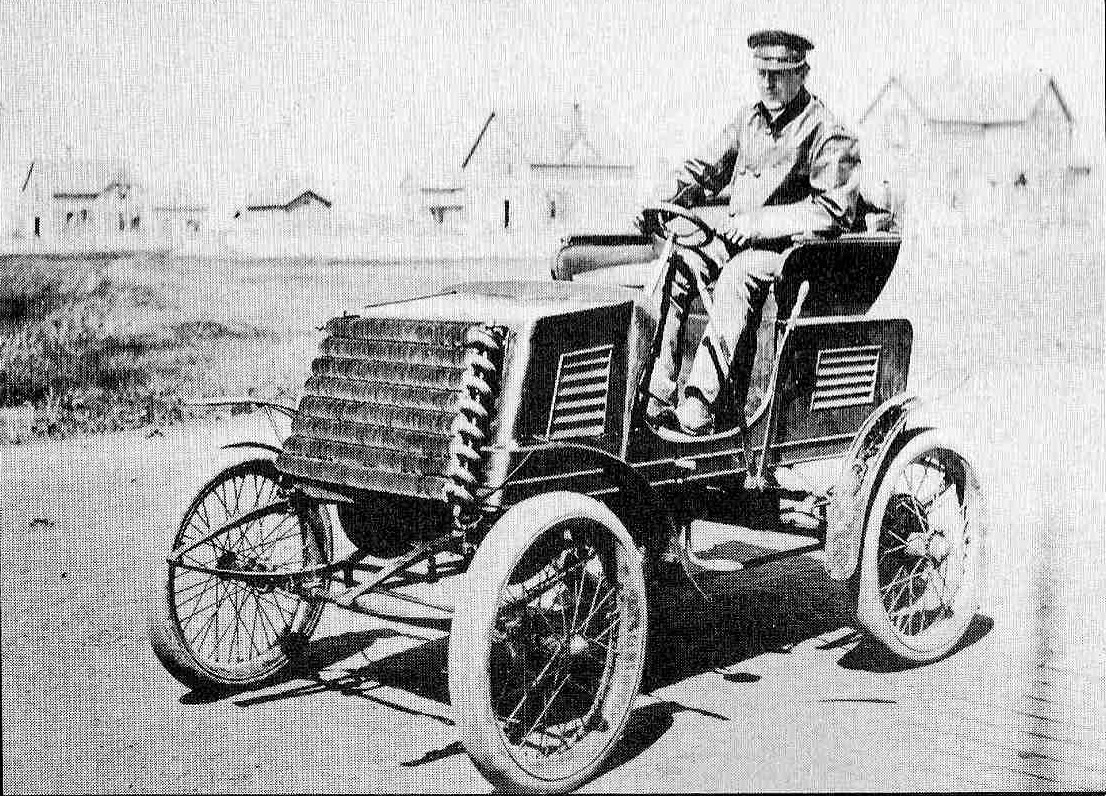
Thomas Jeffery in his prototype Rambler motor vehicle 1901

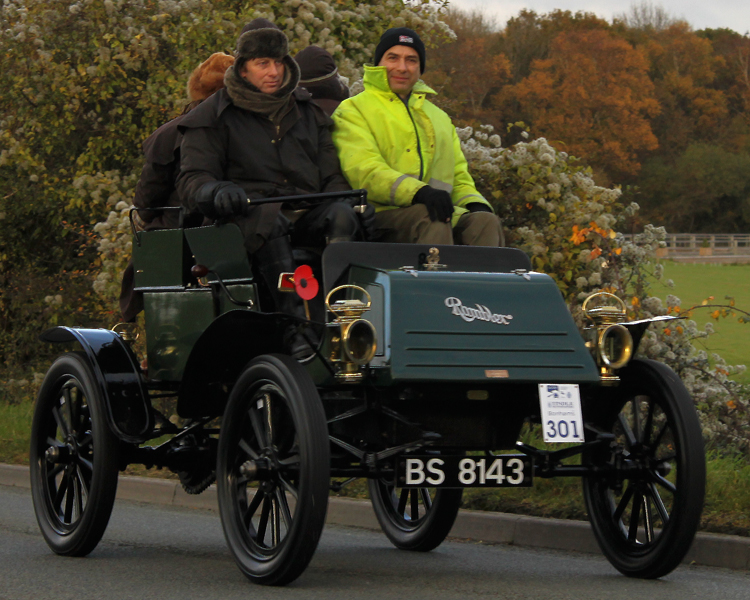
Rambler 6 1/2HP Runabout 1903

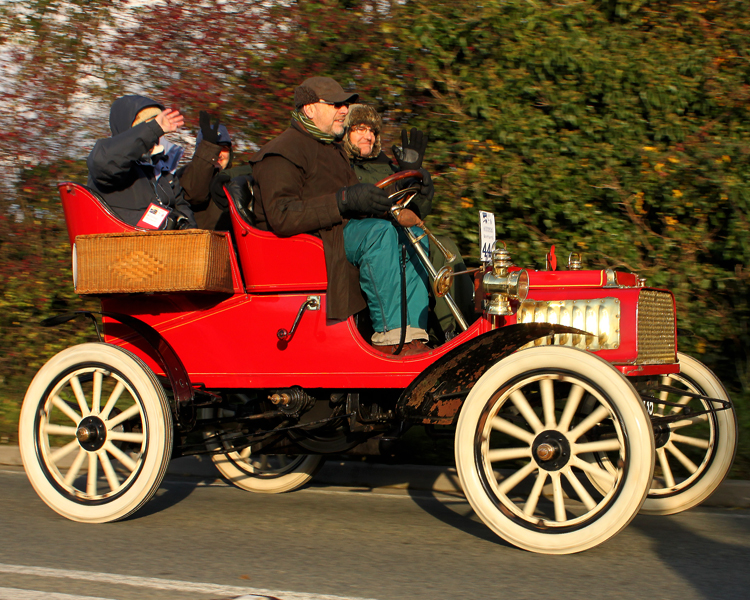
Rambler 7HP Rear-entrance tonneau 1904

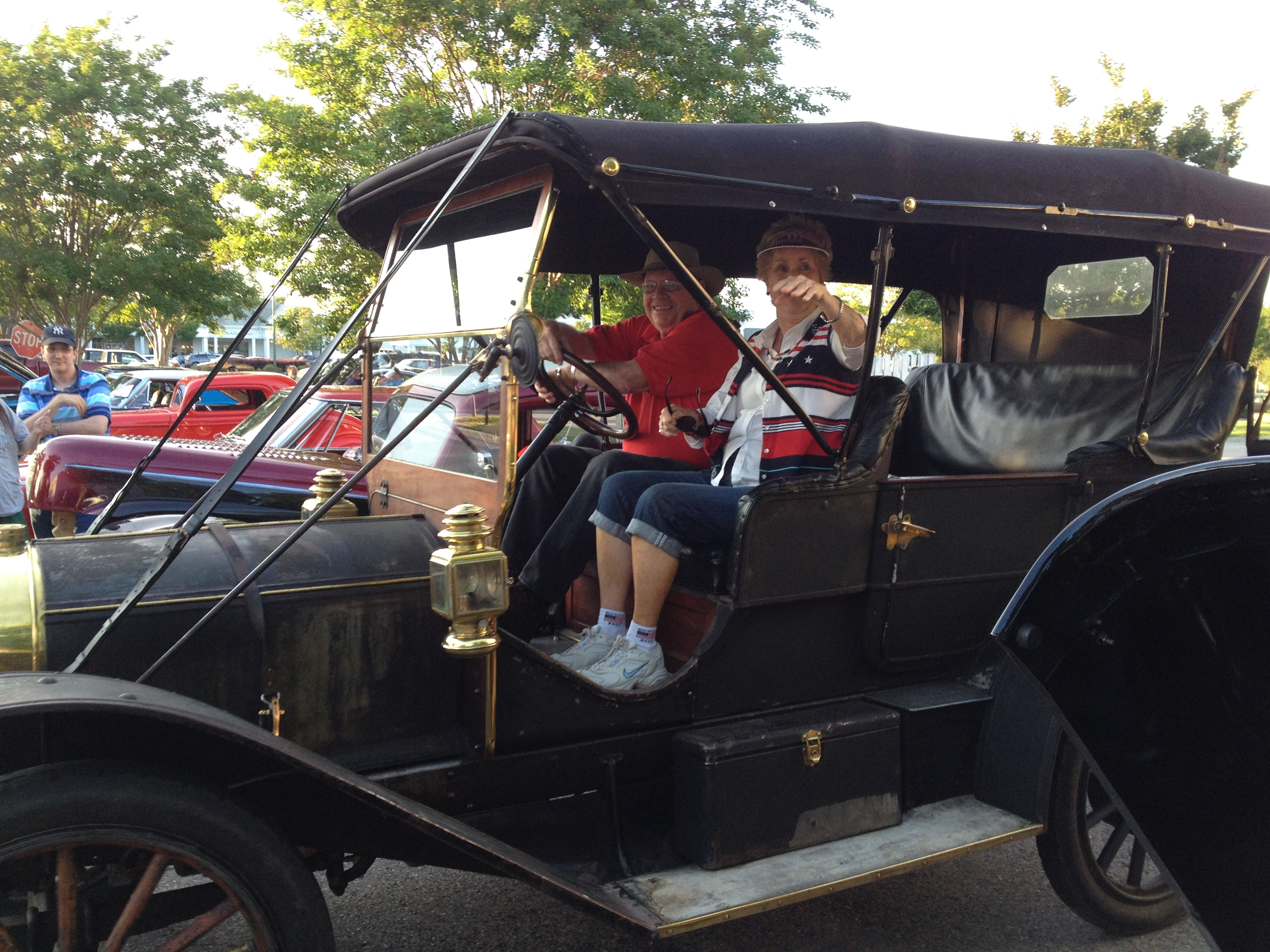
A 1909 Rambler

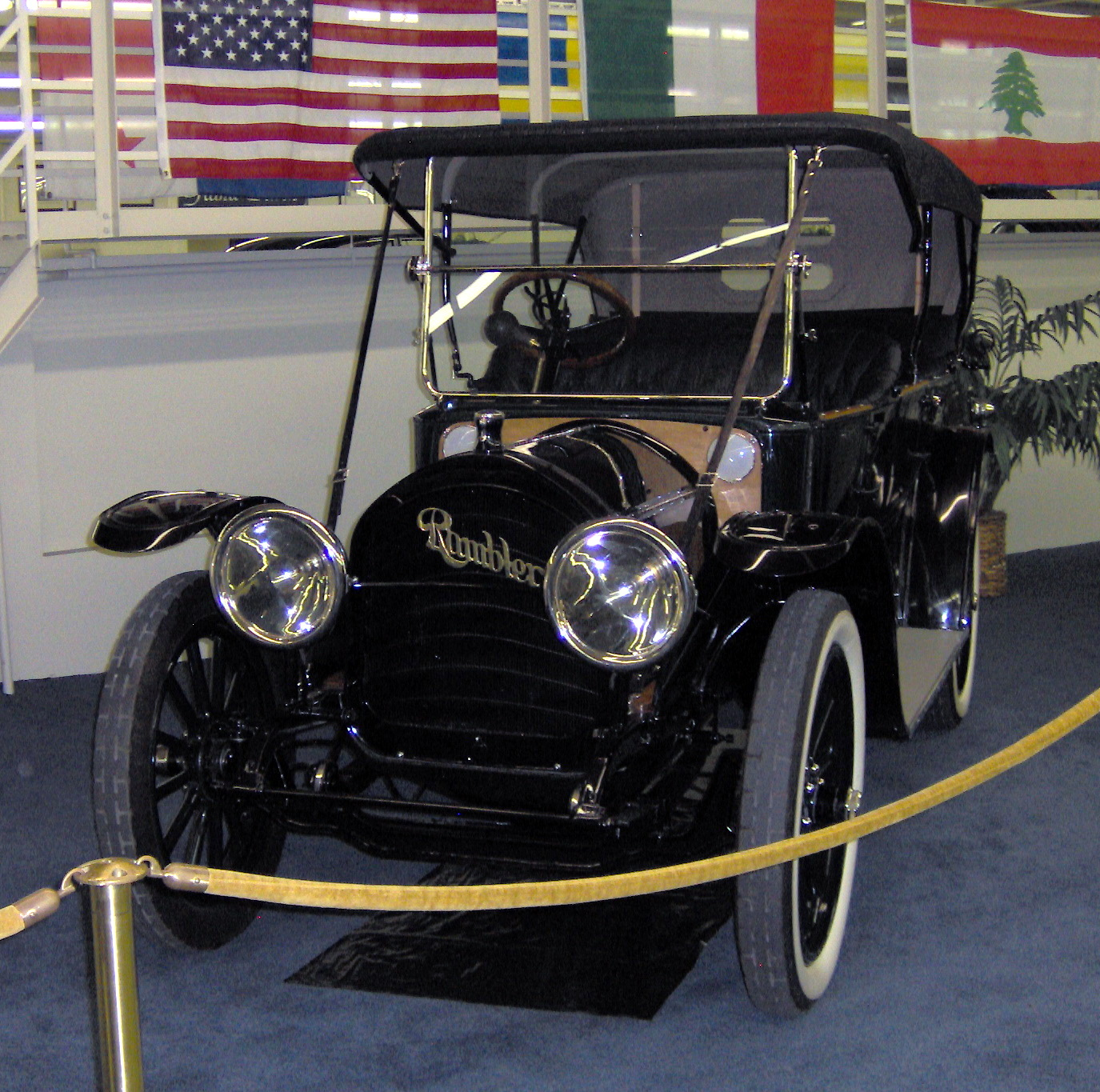
1913 Rambler five-passenger touring car

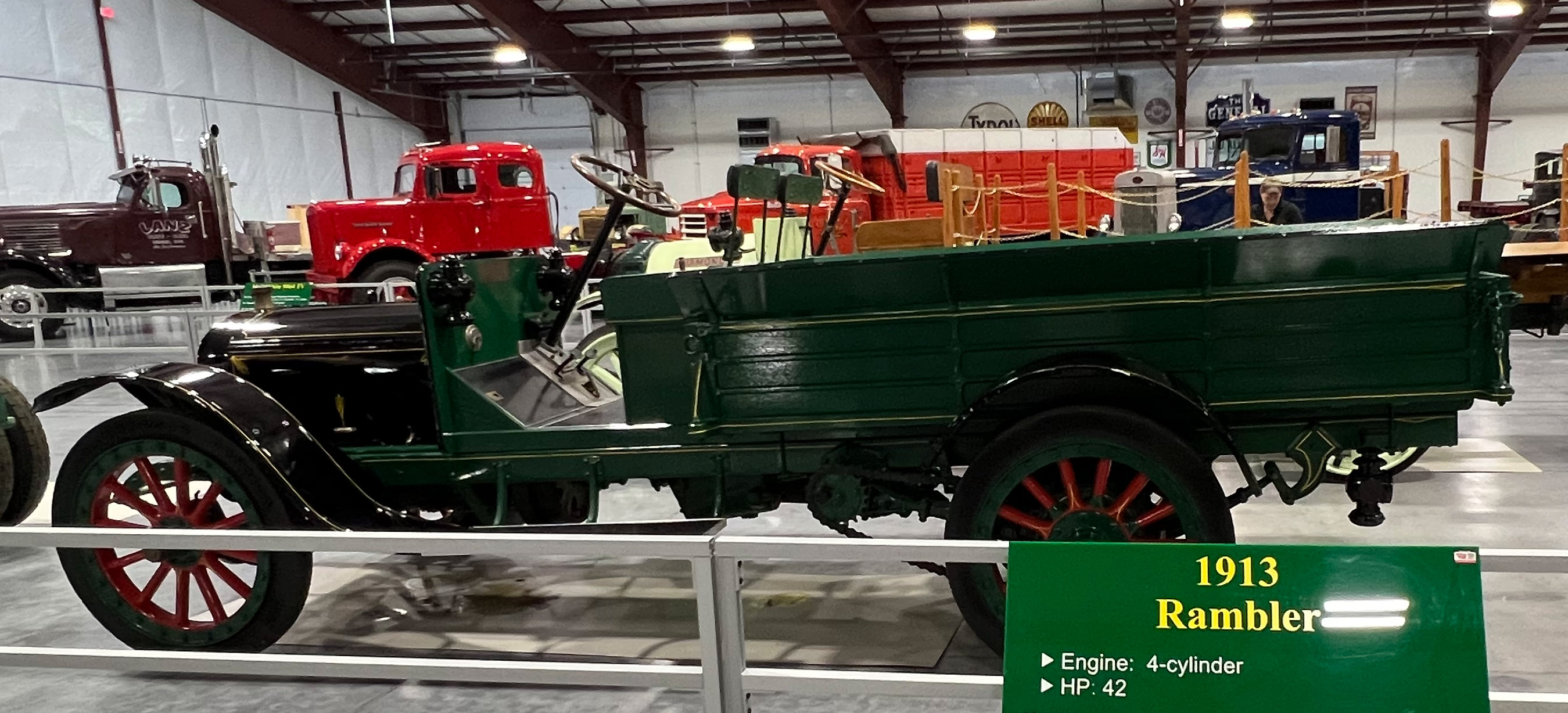
1913 Rambler truck on display at the Iowa 80 Trucking Museum, Walcott, Iowa.

== Rambler 1950–1957 ==
Under the direction of Charles Nash's successor, George W. Mason, Nash-Kelvinator Corporation began the development of a small car that could be produced inexpensively for the post-World War II economy. Both General Motors and Ford had plans to develop smaller-sized cars after the war, but did not realize them. Moreover, steel shortages following the war limited the amount of raw materials that Nash could obtain. Hence, Mason ordered the development of a "compact car" that would have greater appeal to consumers, because the Crosley in production at that time was considered too small to be practical. The new Nash compact featured a unique convertible design. It included many standard features that were typically options on other cars. This approach maximized profits for the company. Nash-Kelvinator trademarked Rambler in 1950, the same nameplate as was used by its predecessor company in the early 1900s.

When introduced, the Rambler was an immediate success for Nash. As the steel quotas related to the Korean War eased, the Rambler line was broadened in its model types, first a station wagon and two-door hardtop (no B-pillar) named "Country Club", and later a two-door sedan. A further expansion of the line for 1954 included a four-door sedan and station wagon called "Cross Country" on a stretched wheelbase, which proved to be as successful as the first generation of two-door sedan convertibles. The Rambler became the most successful of the early post-Second World War American compacts compared to the Henry J (and rebadged Allstate version), Willys Aero, and Hudson Jet.

The first generation of modern Ramblers carried a modified version of Nash's Airflyte styling, which included closed wheel openings. While the wheel openings of any car are a major source of wind resistance, the design was rather primarily an engineering design to increase the strength of the car for impact resistance. The engine is positioned between massive inner fender bulges to allow for the skirted front fenders along with a narrow 52.25 in (1,327 mm) front track to provide a turning circle of 37 ft (11.3 m). Ramblers continued to use this styling until 1955 when the front wheels were revealed by a periodic design update.

In 1954 the Rambler offered the first combination heating and air conditioning unit available on American cars. The unit could be an add-on or could be installed at the factory for $395, which at that time was about the lowest-cost unit available in an American car.

In 1954, American Motors Corporation (AMC) was formed from the merger of Nash-Kelvinator and the Hudson Motor Car Company. Following the merger, 1955 and 1956 Ramblers were badged as both Nashes and Hudsons, with no visible differences. Rambler became a marque in its own right for the 1958 model year. The Nash and Hudson makes continued as a "senior" model only through 1957, after which all AMC's offerings were marketed as Ramblers, except the imported 1958–1962 Metropolitan.

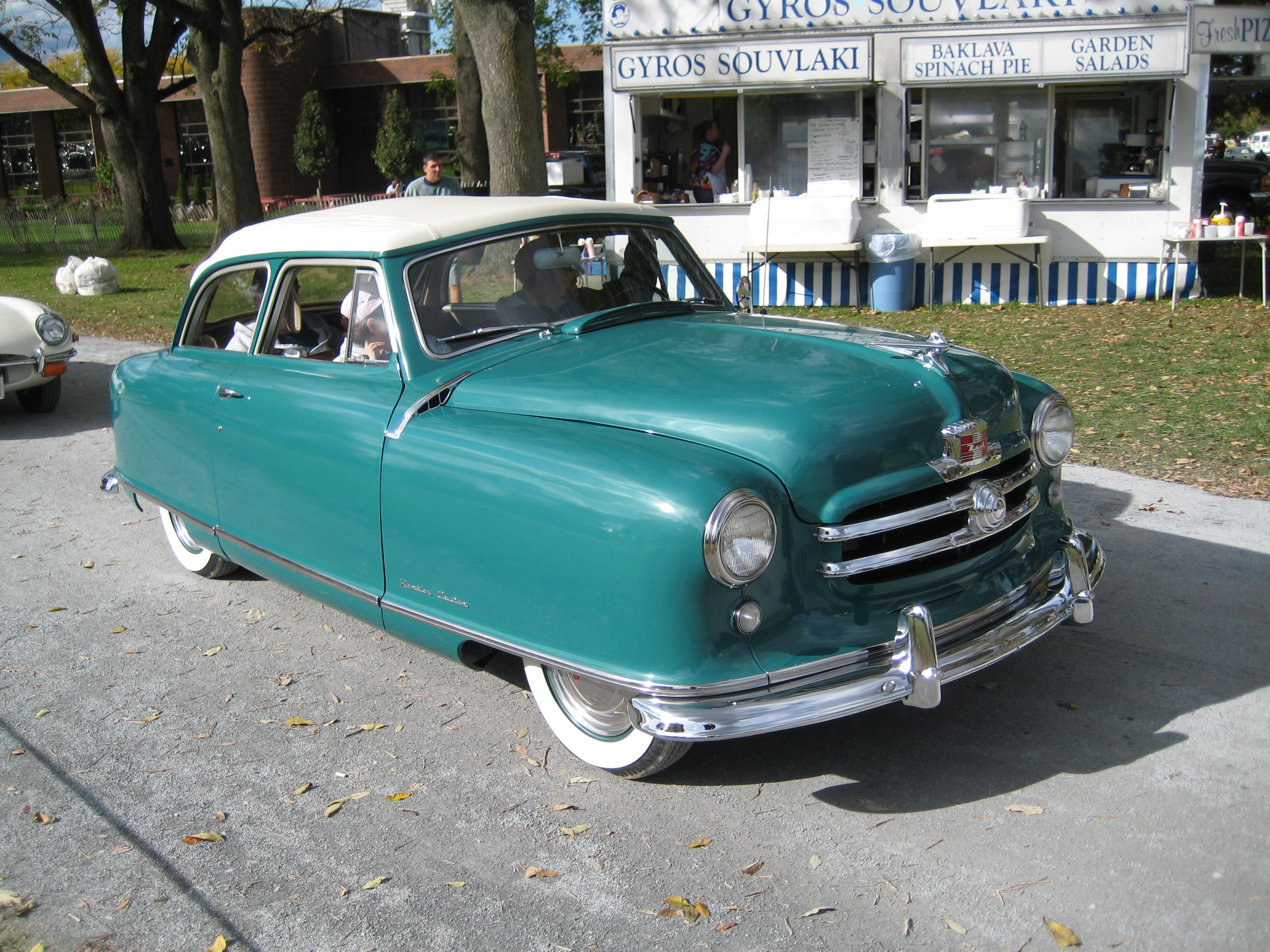
1951 Nash Rambler Custom two-door sedan

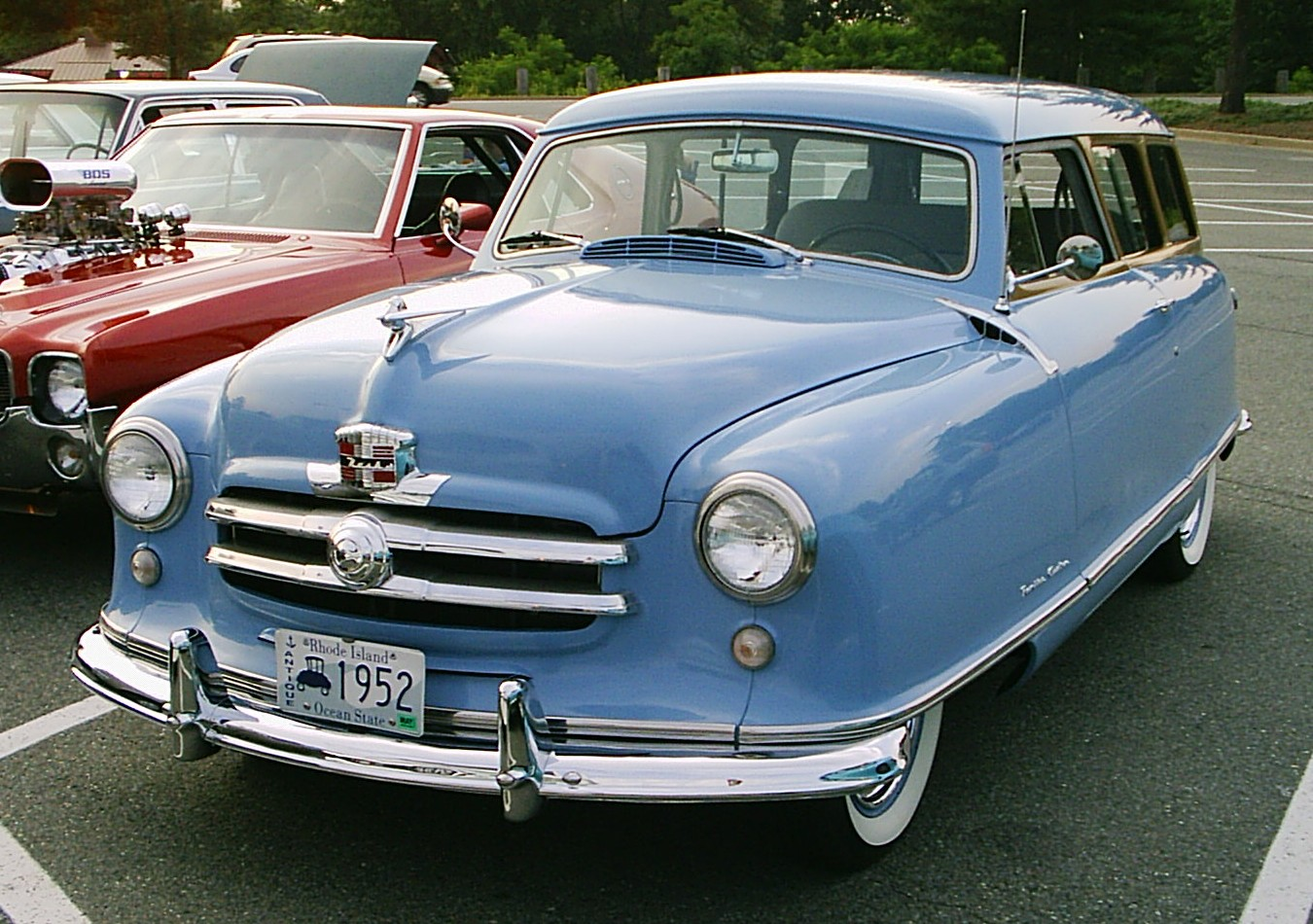
1952 Nash Rambler wagon

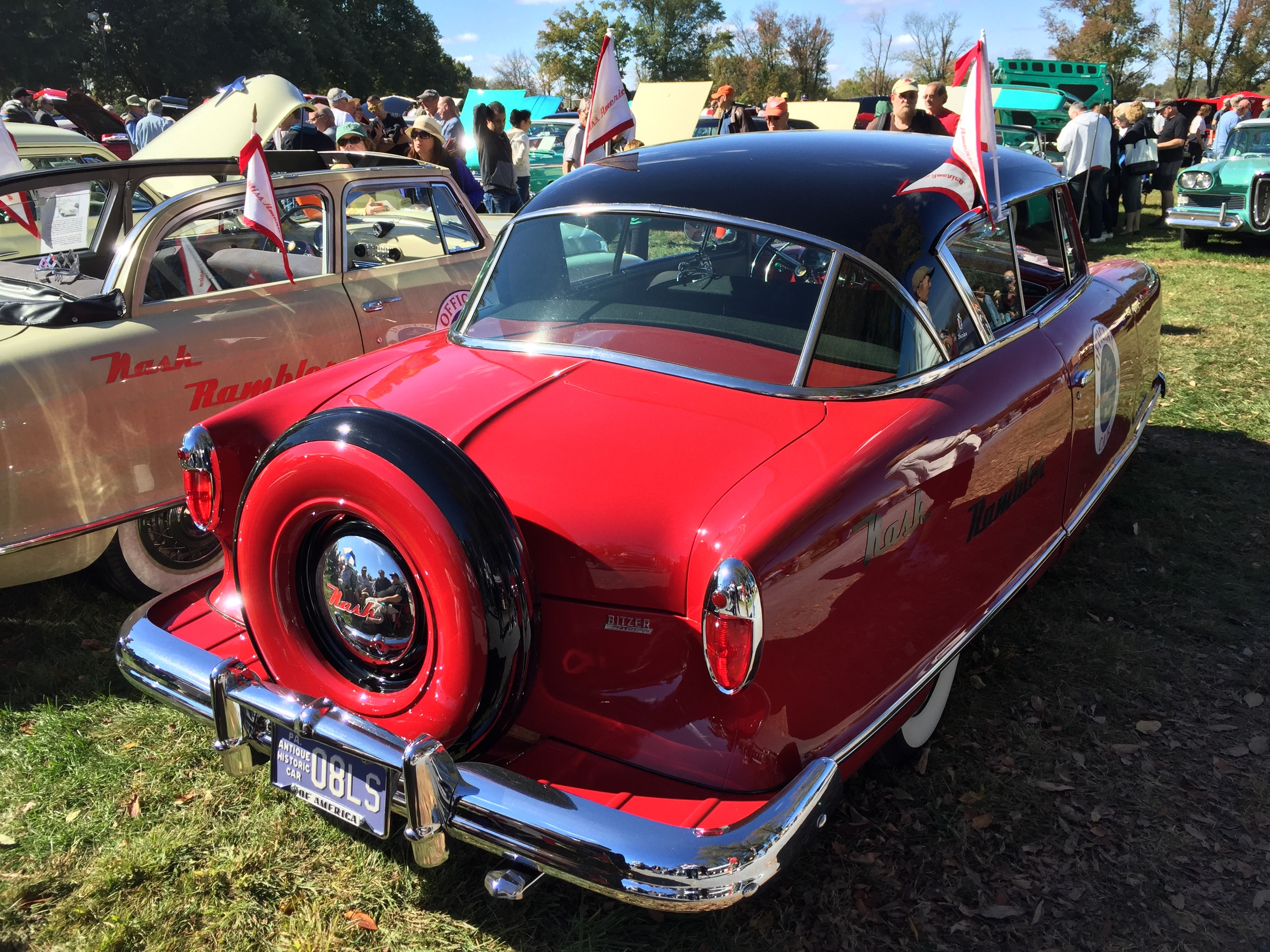
1954 Nash Rambler Custom Country Club

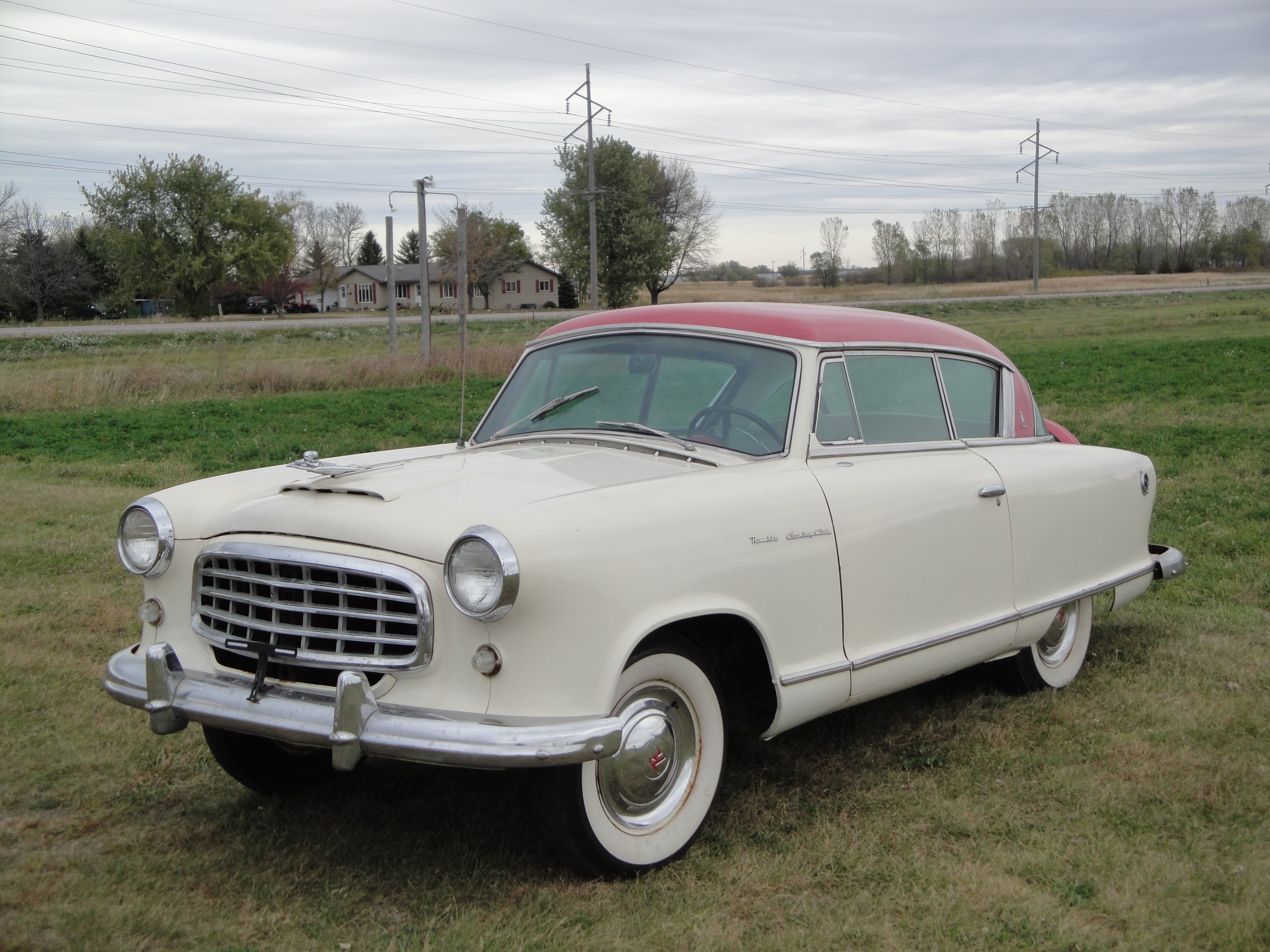
1955 Rambler Country Club

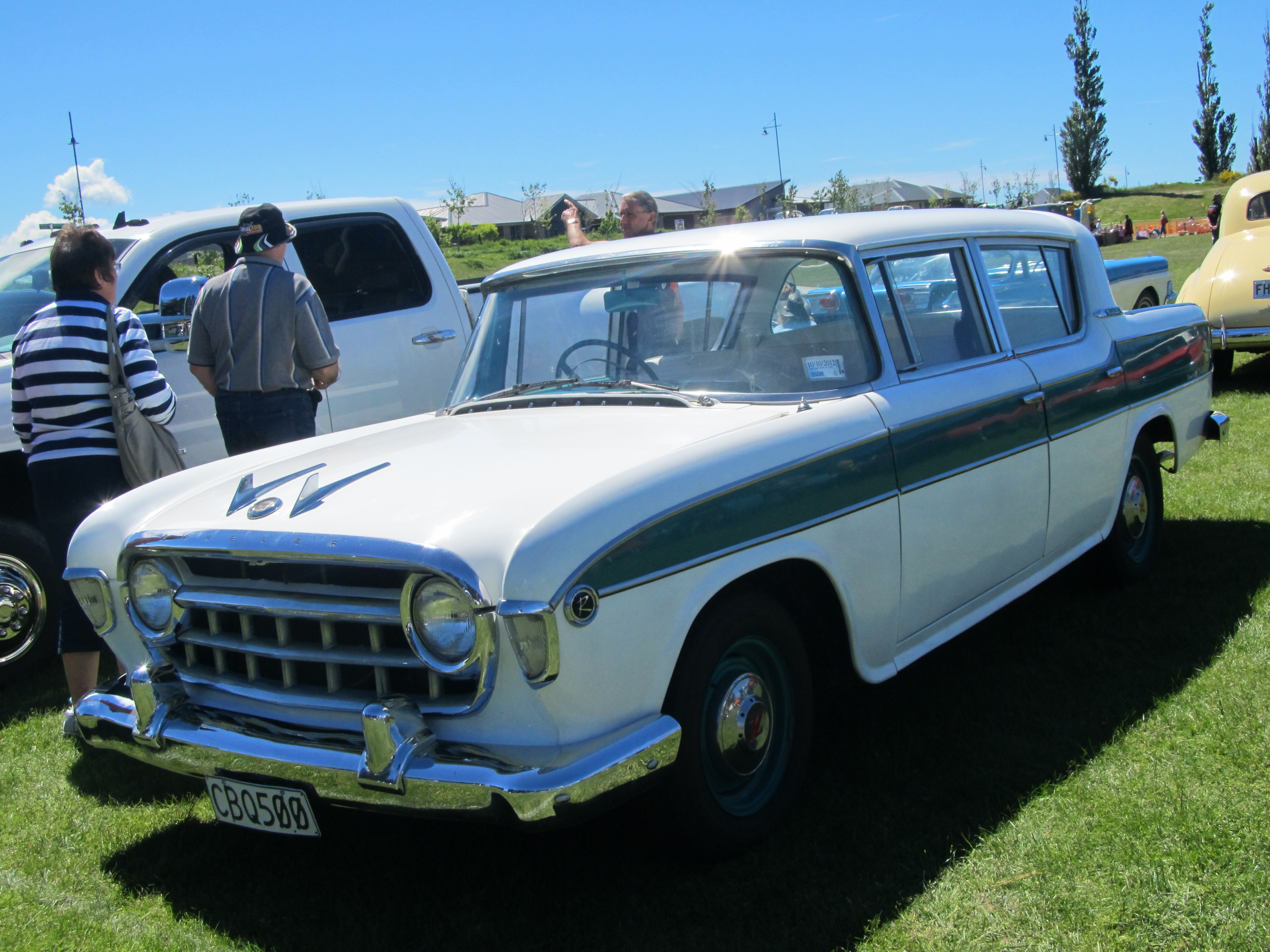
1956 Nash Rambler 4-Door Sedan

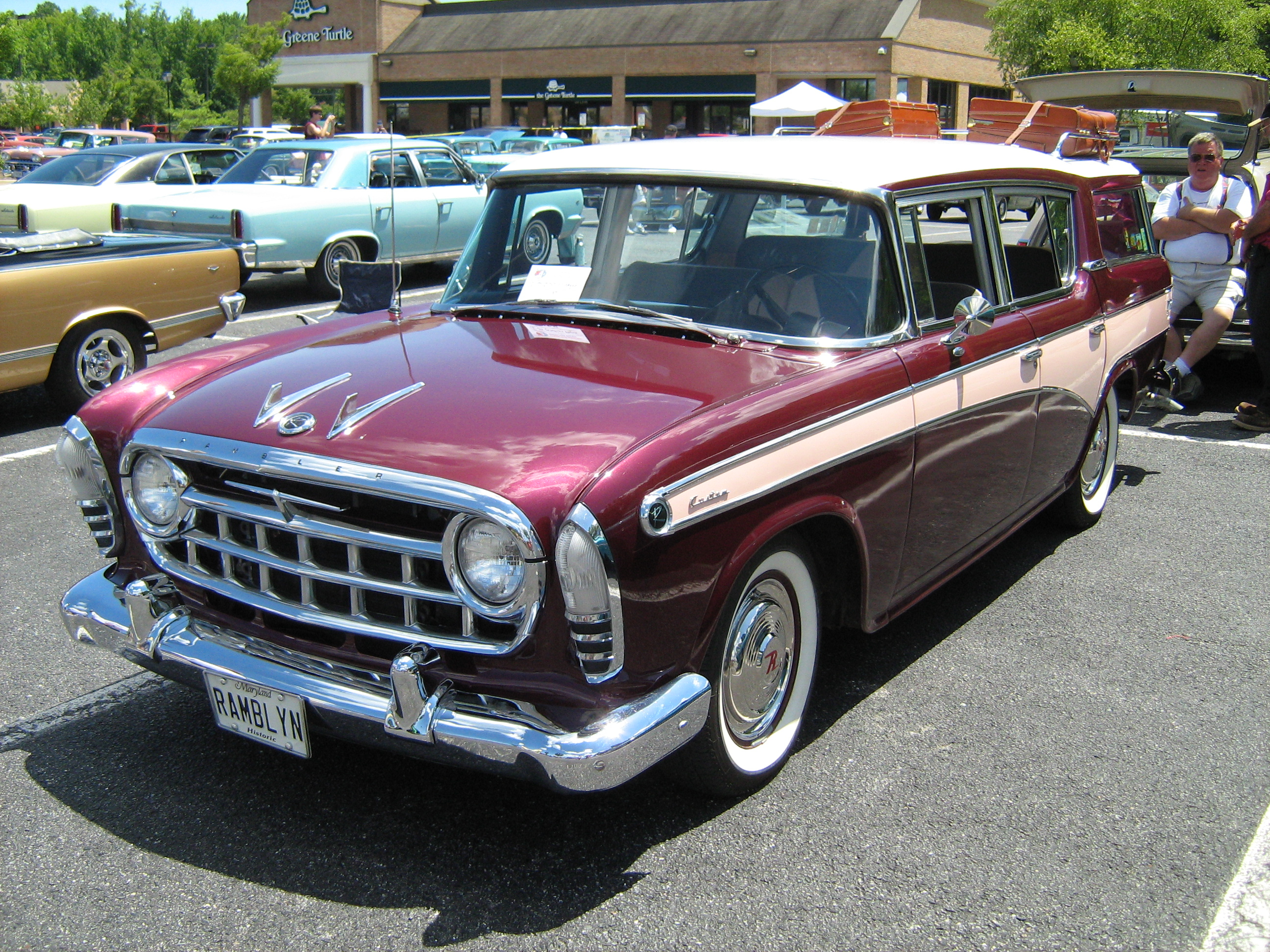
1957 Rambler Custom Cross-Country wagon

== Rambler 1958–1969 ==
Rambler logo, 1960s

With the elimination of the Nash and Hudson marque, Rambler became the primary AMC make for 1958. At the start of the 1960s, George Romney made a marketing decision that more fully unified the Rambler model names under the Rambler brand. In 1962, the Ambassador, a top-trim level model, was officially brought under the Rambler name (it had previously been named the "Ambassador by Rambler"). The former Rambler Six and Rambler Rebel V8 were renamed the Rambler Classic. While the top-line models for 1958-1961 were advertised as the "Ambassador V-8 by Rambler", but on the cars themselves, the badging was "Rambler Ambassador".

In 1958, AMC re-introduced America's first successful compact car, the Rambler American, after a three-year hiatus. This car was essentially the no-frills, economical 1950 Nash Rambler, but slightly restyled and modernized with a new grille and full cut-out wheel openings. The Recession of 1958 hurt all carmakers except AMC, whose economy-oriented Ramblers saw high demand. The American was an instant success and lost sales only after the "Big Three" (GM, Ford, and Chrysler) each introduced compact cars of their own in the 1960s (GM "X" body, Ford Falcon, and Chrysler A platform).

Romney also put into play his plan to slash production costs, which involved more common parts sharing between the Ambassador and Classic models. Beginning in 1962, all "senior" Rambler models would share the same automobile platform with identical wheelbase and body parts. However, the engines, trims, and equipment levels distinguished the Classic from the Ambassador. The Rambler's compact size (by U.S. standards) also made it an international competitor, and between 1961 and 1965, AMC opened thirteen foreign assembly plants, from Costa Rica to the Philippines.

In 1963, the entire Rambler line received the Motor Trend Car of the Year award. However, Romney's departure to become Michigan governor opened the door for his successor, Roy Abernethy, to redirect the company towards a strategy of competing head-to-head with the Big Three (General Motors, Chrysler Corporation, and Ford Motor Company) with a variety of bodies and automobile platforms. This new plan also included marketing the various models apart from the Rambler brand name, which Abernethy thought would be a hindrance in the market segments he hoped to pursue.

One of the first moves in that direction was the development of the 1965 line of Ramblers, which visually split the Classic from the Ambassador while still sharing many parts. Once again, the Ambassador had a unique, extended wheelbase. In addition, AMC introduced the Marlin, a hardtop fastback intended to enter AMC in the youth and personal luxury market segments as well as also positioning it as a "halo" vehicle.

AMC chief stylist Richard Teague introduced a restyled and attractive Rambler American in 1964, which was a sales success. This basic body remained in its original shape through 1969.

Backed by marketing reports, Abernethy next made a persuasive argument to the AMC board that the Rambler name had not only acquired a stodgy image and hindered increasing sales, but that consumers associated it with compact cars. In what hindsight would show to be an ill-conceived decision, American Motors began to phase it out in favor of an AMC marque starting with the 1966 model year as it attempted to become a multiplatform automobile manufacturer.

By 1968, the only vehicle produced by AMC to carry the Rambler marque was the compact Rambler American. Although designed as a "basic" economy car, the American spawned the audacious SC/Rambler, developed with Hurst Performance. While AMC planned to produce only 500 for the 1969 model year, the "Scrambler" proved popular so two more groups of about 500 each were built. All featured the same 390 cu in (6.4 L) V8, four-barrel carburetor, and close-ratio four-speed transmission of the AMX, plus Hurst shifter, Twin-Grip (limited slip) differential, and cold air hood.

For the final year in 1969, the "American" line was called Rambler. The 1969 Rambler (and Chevrolet Corvair and Dodge Dart) were the only U.S. compact cars available that year in a two-door hardtop body style; Ford compacts were available only as sedans.

The last U.S.-built Rambler, of over 4.2 million cars that carried the Rambler name that rolled off the assembly line in Kenosha, was produced on 30 June 1969.

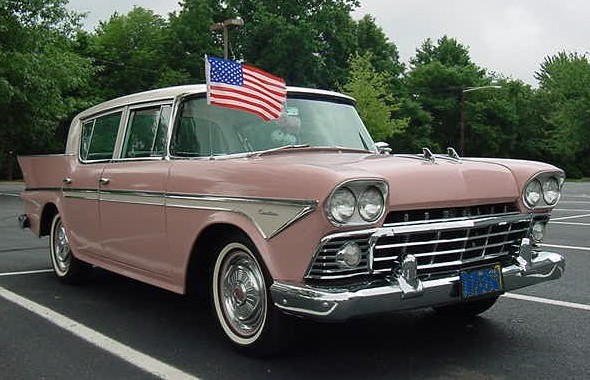
1958 Rambler sedan

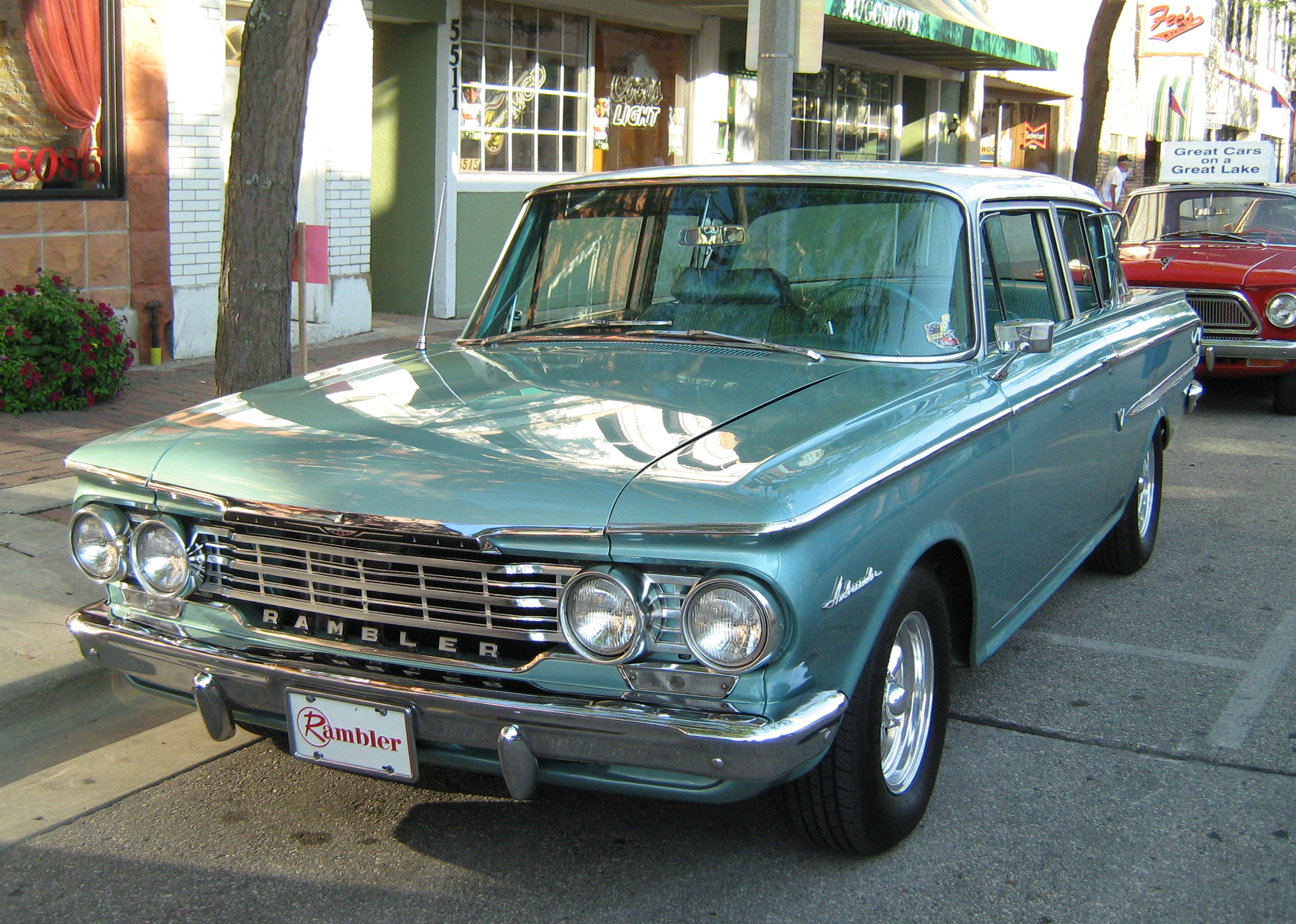
1962 Rambler Ambassador

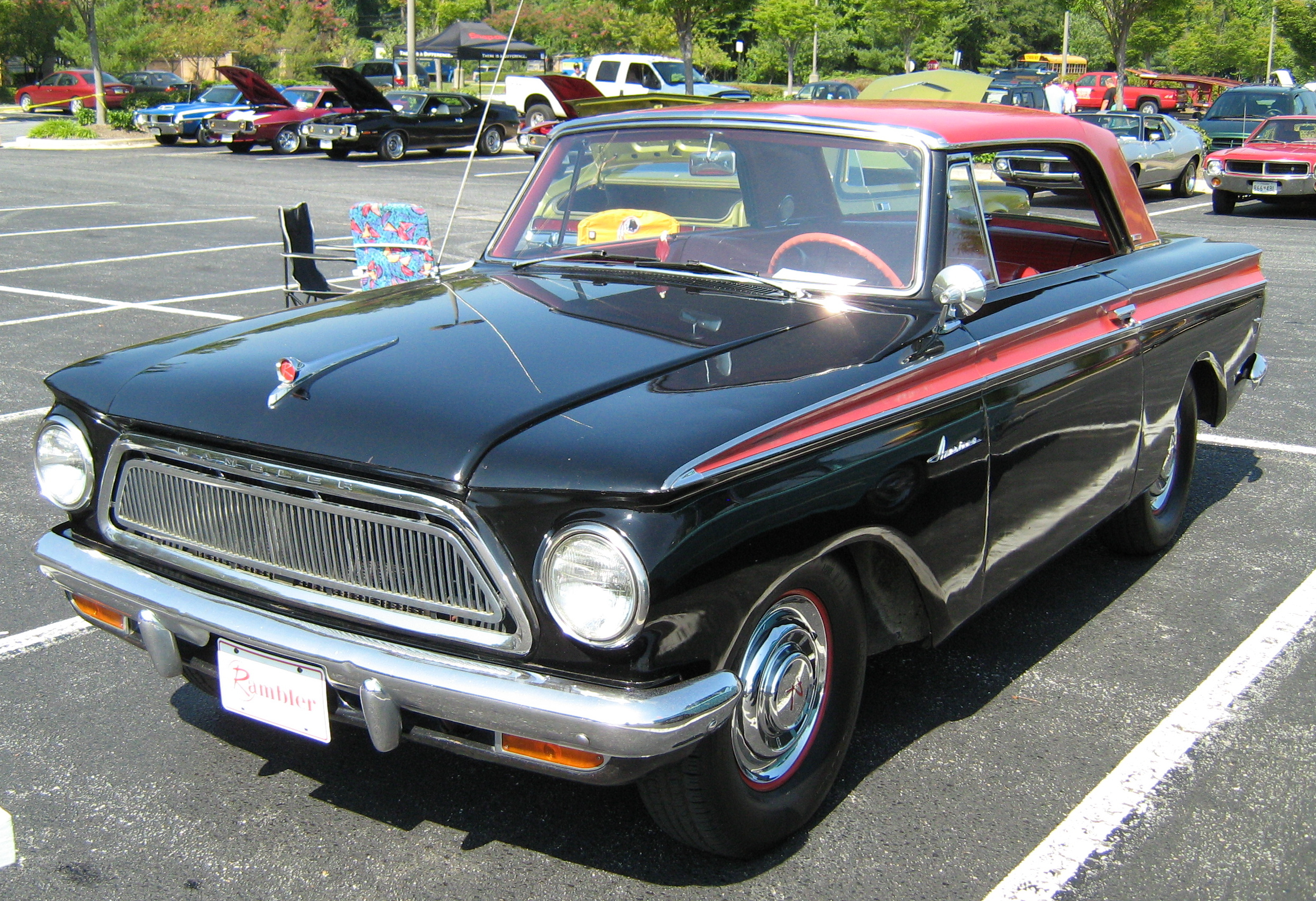
1963 Rambler American 440 2-door hardtop

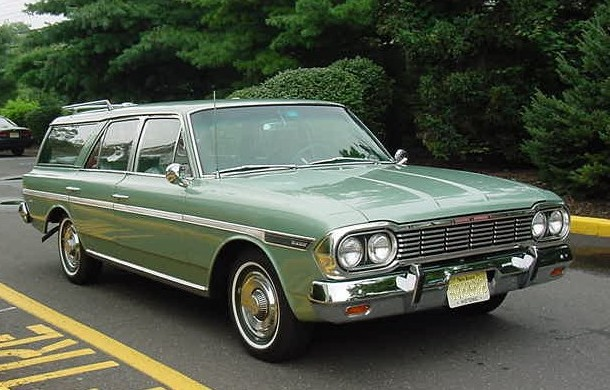
1964 Rambler Classic 770 wagon

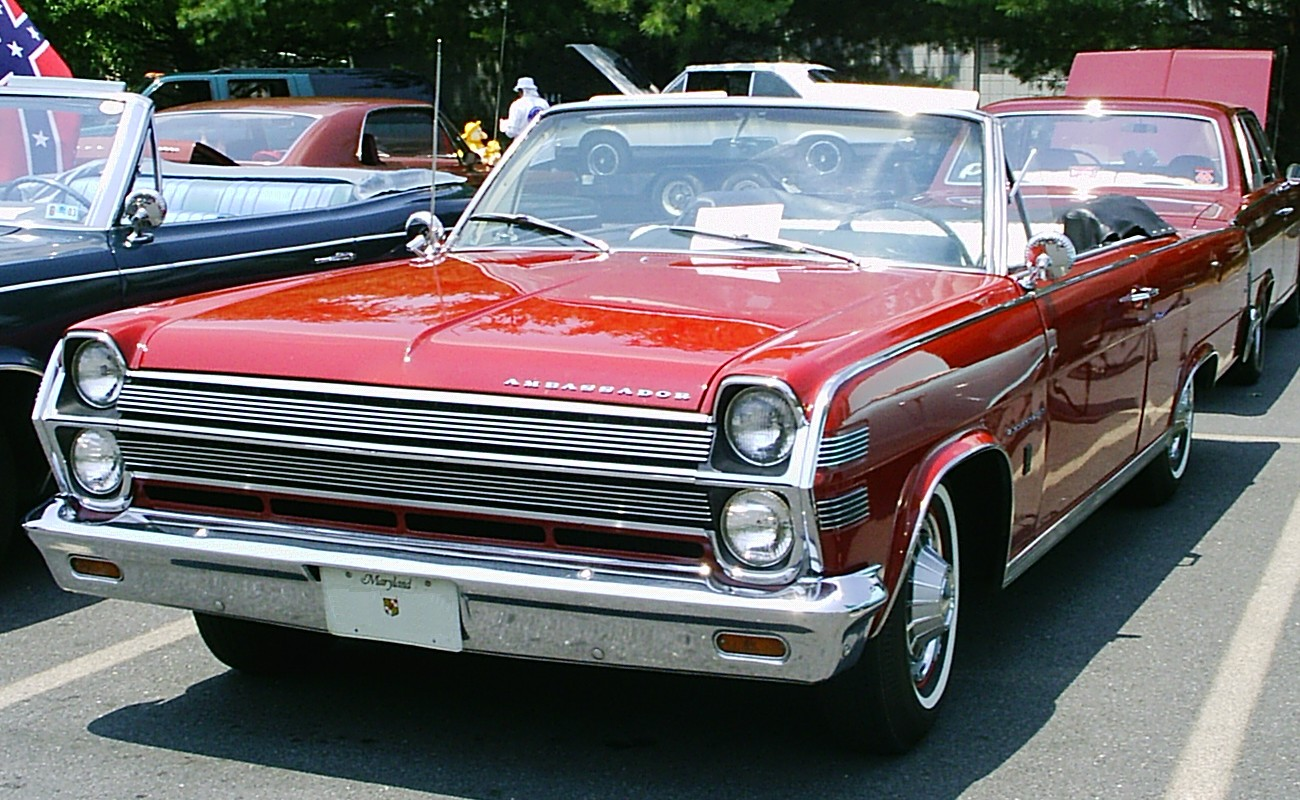
1966 Rambler Ambassador 990 convertible

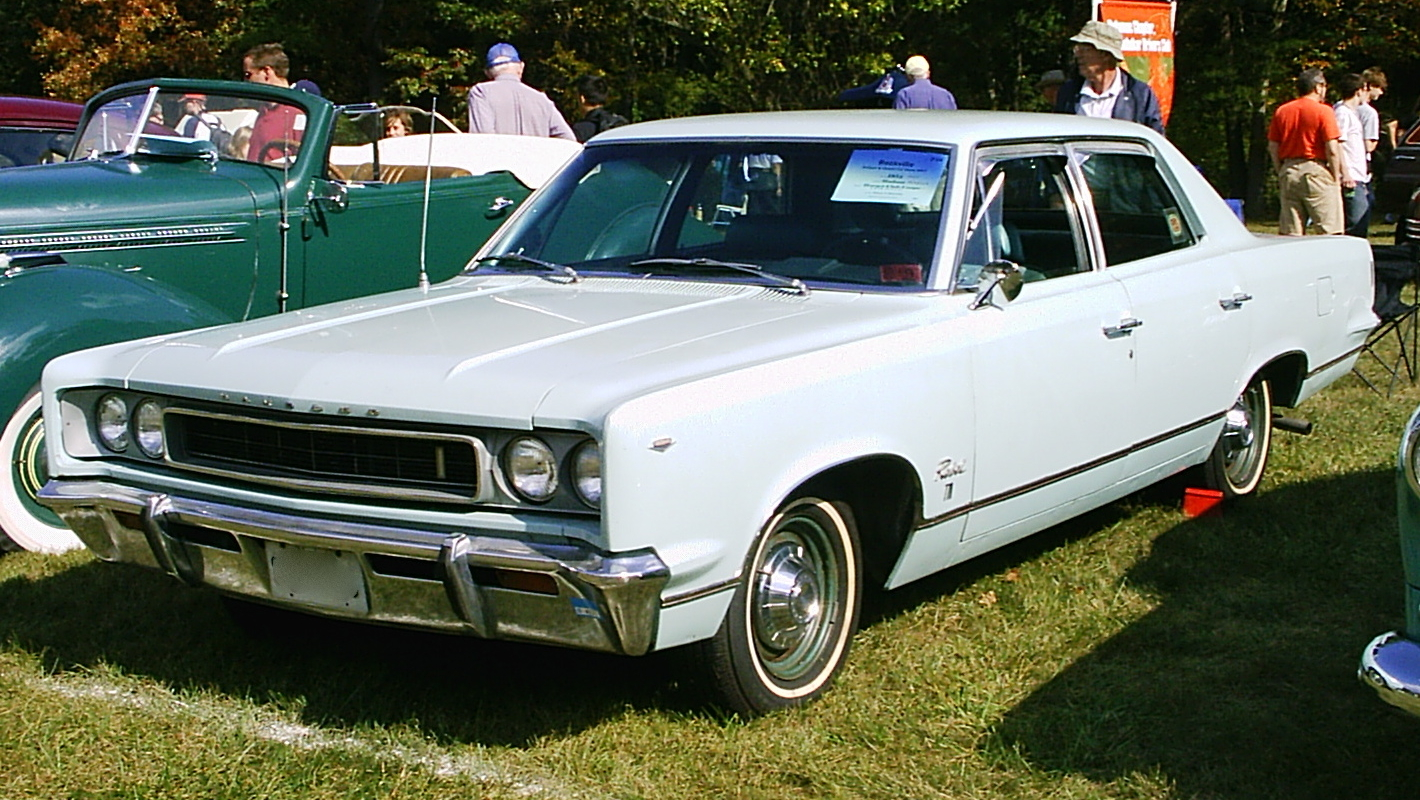
1967 Rambler Rebel 770 sedan

== Rambler 1970–1983 ==
The Rambler marque was continued in all international markets after it was dropped in the United States. AMC vehicles were badged as “Rambler" in Argentina, Australia, Chile, Costa Rica, Mexico, New Zealand, Peru, Philippines, Venezuela, South Africa, and the United Kingdom. In Argentina, a unique model based on the third-generation Rambler American became the IKA Torino in 1967. It was later named the Renault Torino and produced until 1981. The Rambler nameplate was last used on automobiles in 1983 by Vehículos Automotores Mexicanos (VAM) in Mexico.

== Rambler brand cars ==
Historic:

- Rambler: 1901–1913

Compact:

- Rambler American: 1958–1968
- Rambler 1969

Mid-sized:

- Rambler Six and V8: 1957–1960
- Rambler Rebel: 1957–1960
- Rambler Ambassador: 1958–1965
- Rambler Classic: 1961–1966
- Rambler Typhoon: 1964
- Rambler Rebel: 1967
- Rambler Marlin: 1965

Show cars:

- Rambler Palm Beach: 1950
- Rambler Tarpon: 1964

International:

- Rambler Ambassador
  - Costa Rica 1965-1970
  - United Kingdom 1965-1974
- Rambler AMX
  - Australia 1969–1970
- Rambler Hornet
  - Australia 1970–1975
  - Costa Rica 1970-1975 (as "Rambler SST" and "Rambler Unisex")
  - Mexico 1970-1977 (as "VAM American" and "Rambler American")
  - South Africa 1970-1971
  - Venezuela 1970-1977
- Rambler Javelin
  - Australia 1968–1973
  - Germany 1968-1970
  - Mexico 1968-1973
  - Venezuela 1968-1974
  - Philippines 1968–1970.
- Rambler Matador
  - Australia 1971–1977
  - Costa Rica 1971-1974
  - Mexico 1971-1976 (as "Rambler Classic")
  - United Kingdom 1971-1977
- Rambler Rebel
  - Australia 1967–1971
  - Belgium 1967 (as "Renault Rambler")
  - Costa Rica 1967-1970
  - Mexico 1967-1970 (as "Rambler Classic")
  - New Zealand 1967-1971
  - United Kingdom 1967-1970

== International production ==
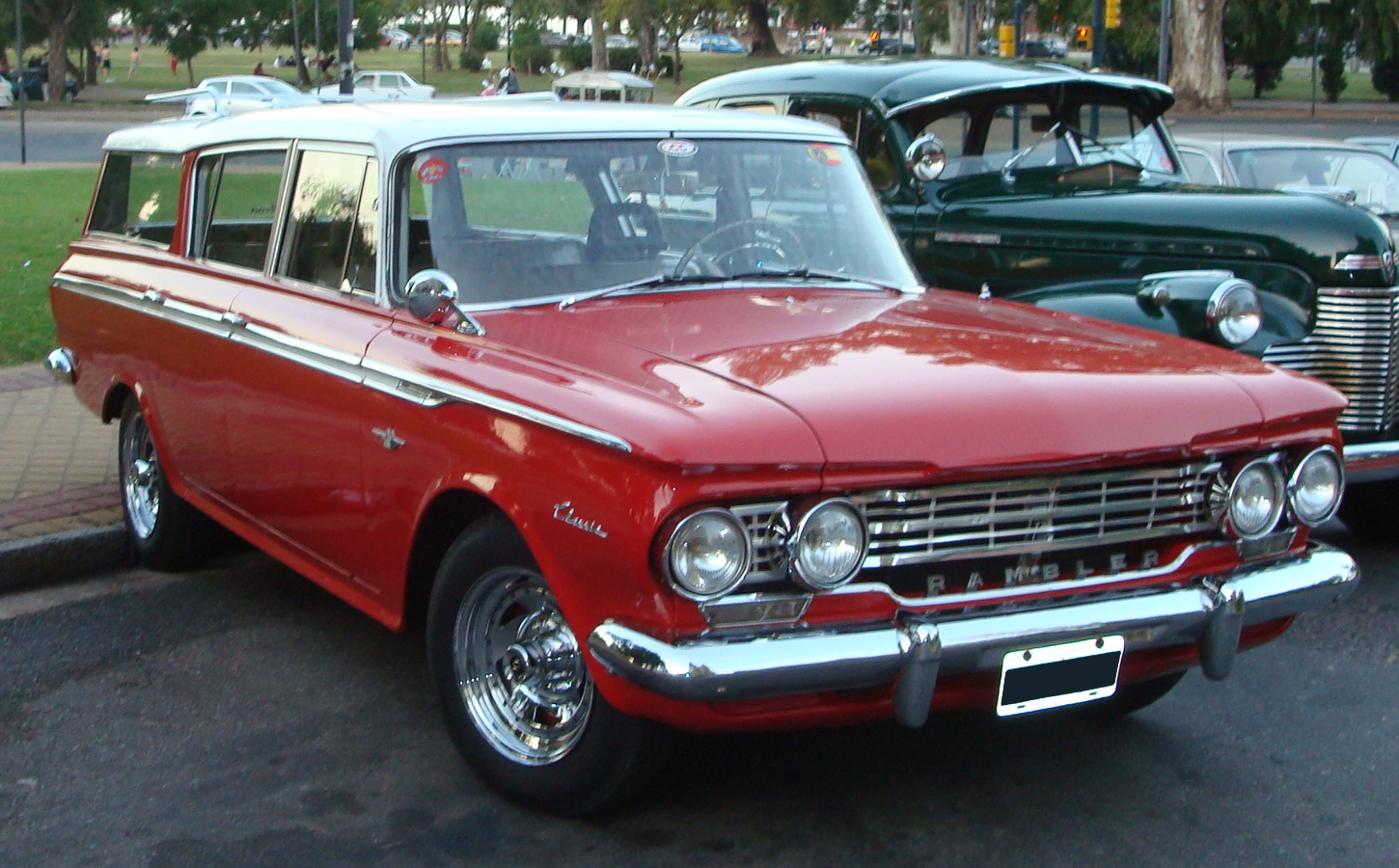
Rambler Classic made by IKA, Argentina

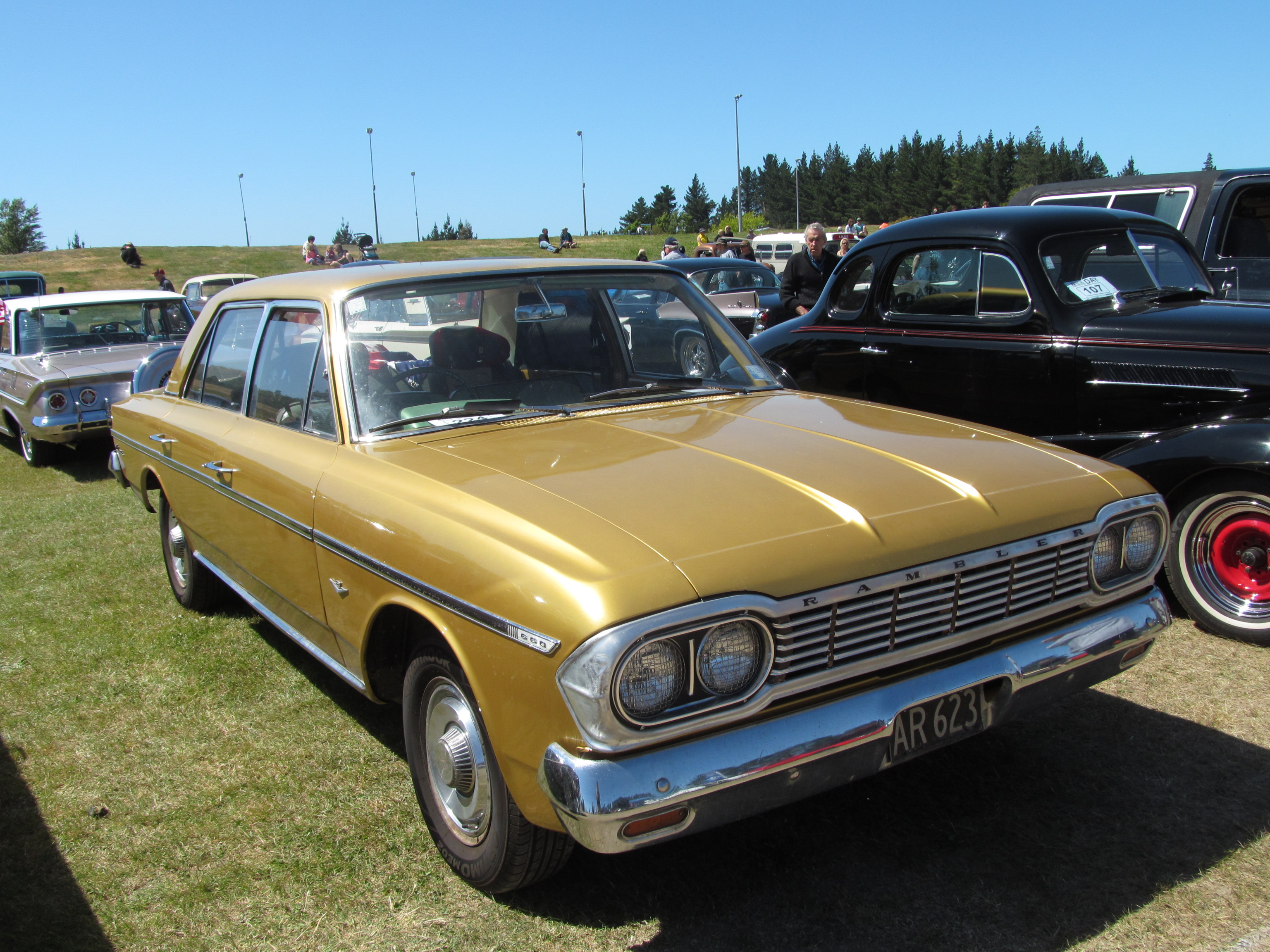
1964 Rambler Classic 660 built by Campbell Motor Industries, New Zealand

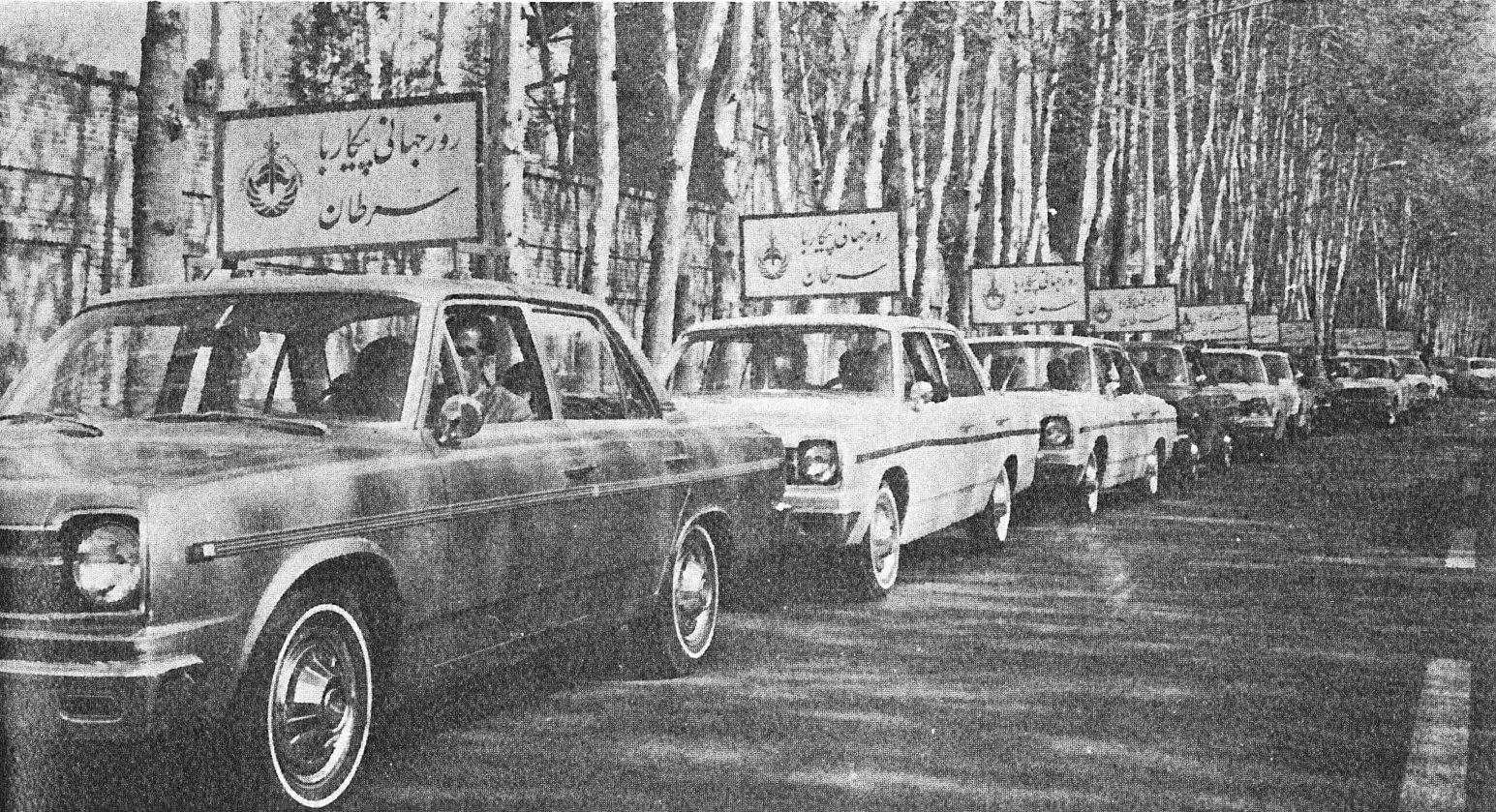
The Sherkate Sahami Jeep company built the 1966 Rambler American from 1967 until 1974 in Iran

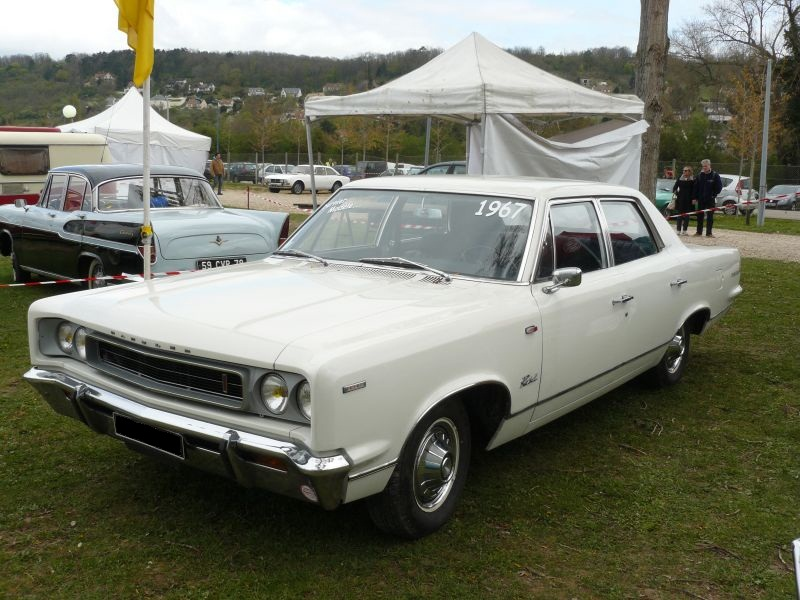
1967 Renault Rambler sedan, built by Renault, Belgium

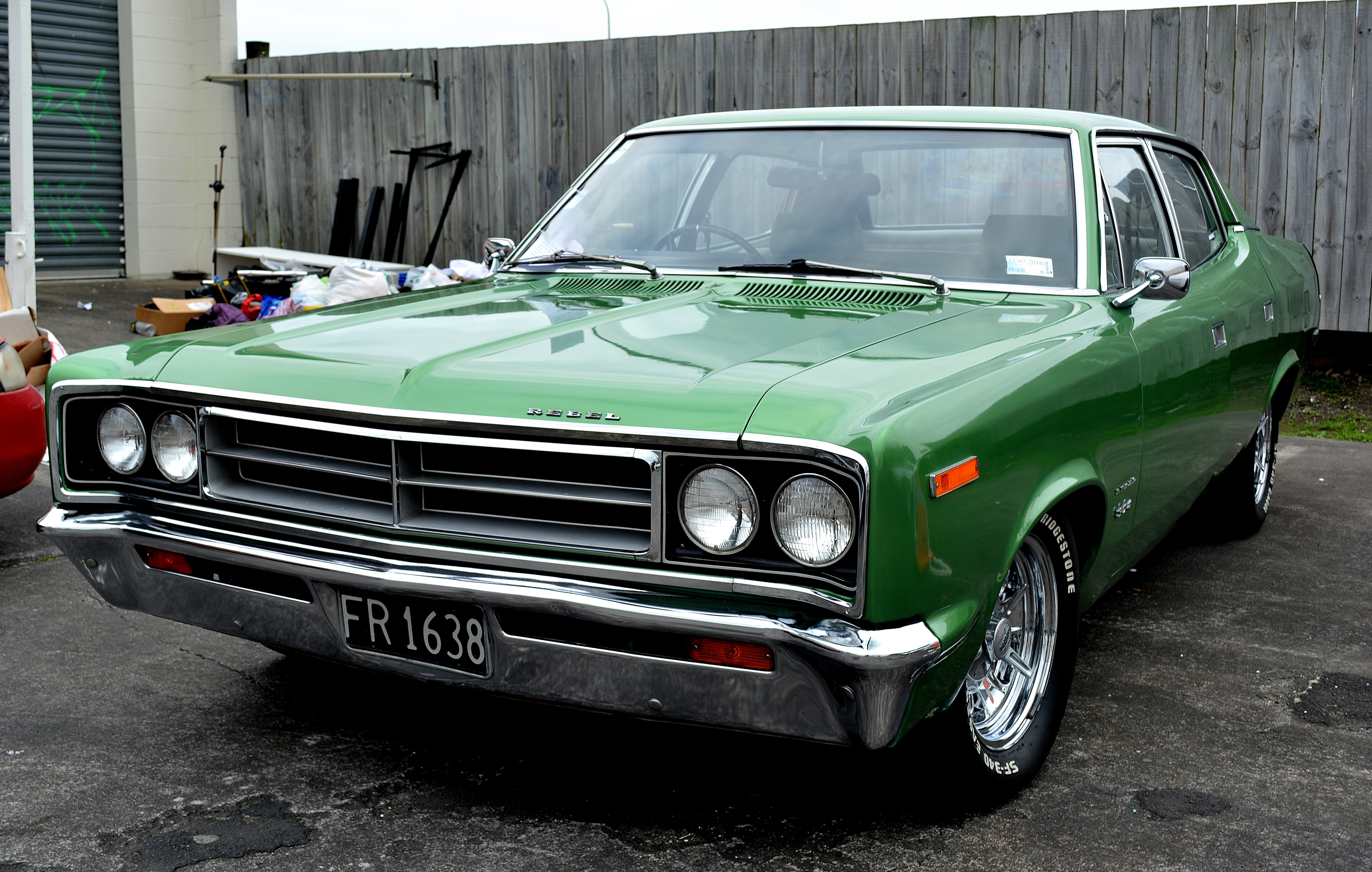
New Zealand-assembled 1970 Rambler Rebel

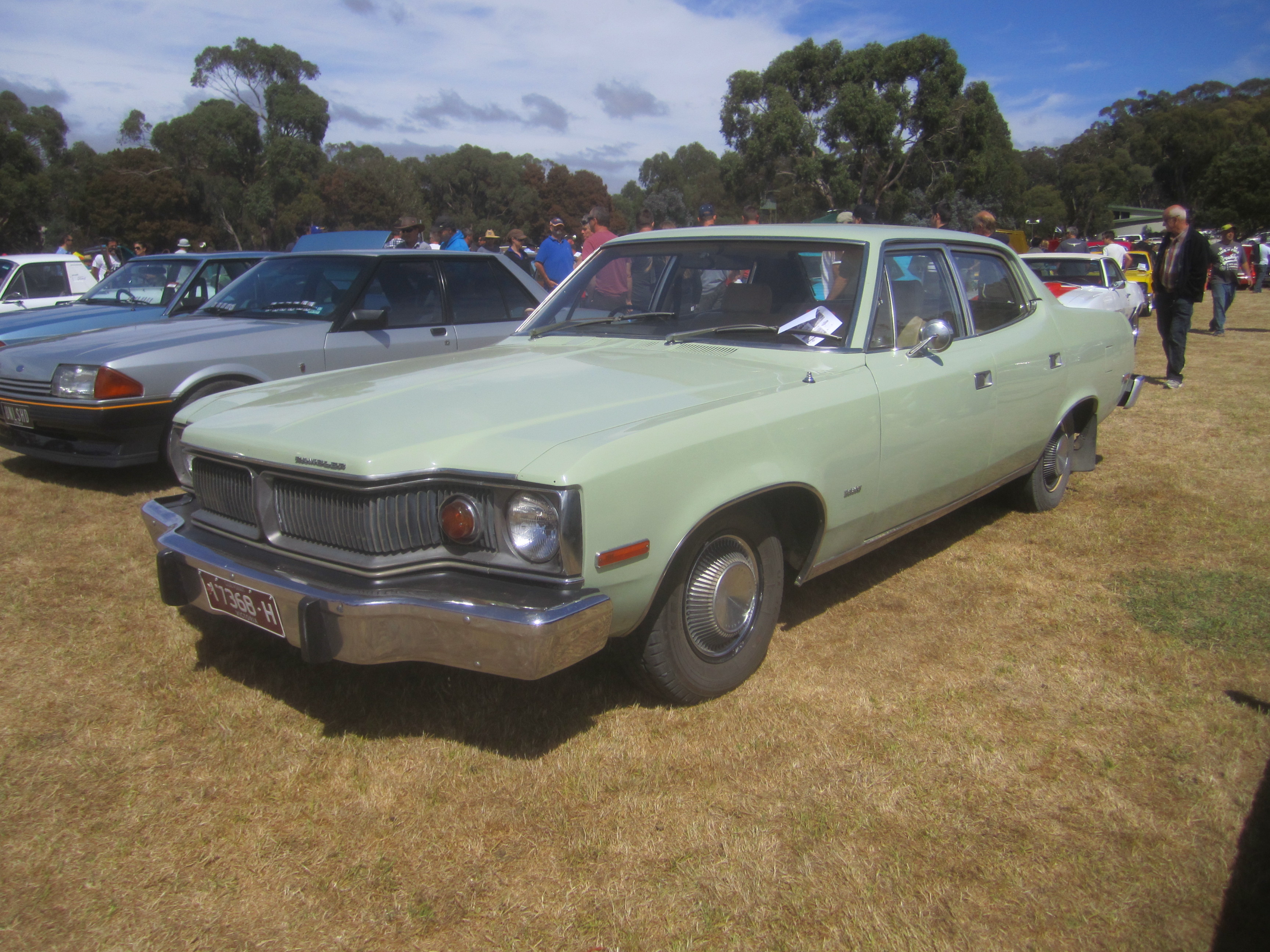
1976 Australian-assembled Rambler Matador (U.S 1974 model)

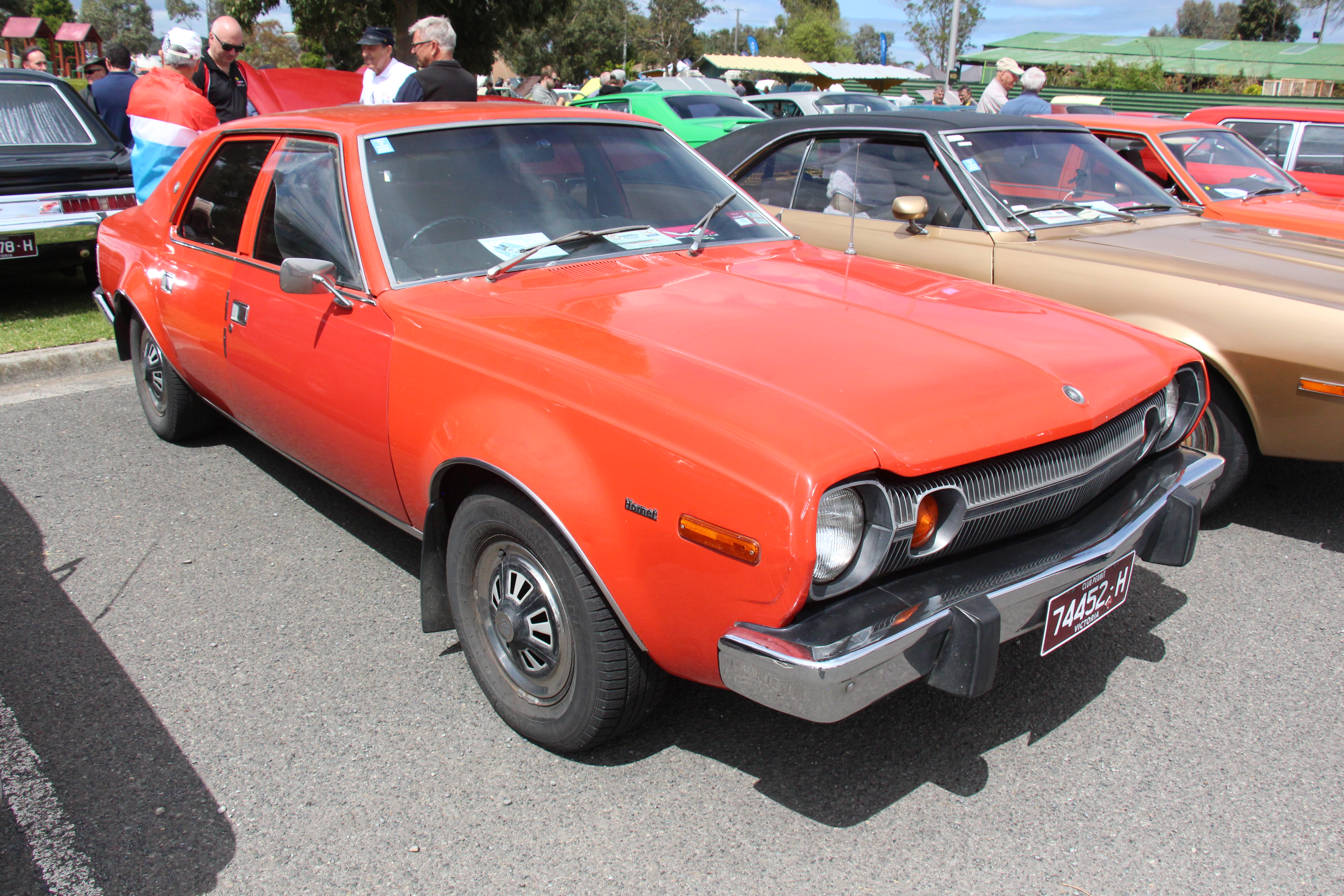
1975 Rambler Hornet built by Australian Motor Industries, Australia

Companies that undertook the production of Rambler vehicles outside of the United States either by local assembly or full import included the following:

North America

- Vehículos Automotores Mexicanos (Mexico): 1963–1983
- Purdy Motor (Costa Rica): 1964-1973
- Motorizada de Costa Rica (Costa Rica): 1974-1978
- Nassau Motors (Bahamas): 196?-197?

Australasia

- Australian Motor Industries (Australia): 1960–1977
- VW Motors Ltd (New Zealand): 1958-1962
- Campbell Motor Industries (New Zealand): 1964–1971
- Luzon Machineries Limited (Philippines): 196?-1970

Europe

- Renault (France/Belgium): 1962-1967
- Jacques Poch (France): 1970s
- Jean-Charles (France): 1970s
- Nash Concessionaires Ltd (United Kingdom): 19??-1960
- Petrol Motor Power Co. (United Kingdom): 1902-1912
- Rambler Motors (A.M.C) Limited (United Kingdom): 1961-1977
- Peter Lindner GmbH (Germany) 1969-1977
- Wilhelm Karmann GmbH (Germany): 1968-1970
- Kolberg & Caspary AS (Norway): 1958-19??

South America

- Automovil de Francia (Venezuela): 1963-1968
- Constructora Venezolana de Vehículos (Venezuela): 1968–1977
- Industrias Kaiser Argentina (Argentina): 1962–1972
- Juan Carlos Lutteral (Argentina) 1979-198?
- Indauto (Chile): 1964-1967
- Automotores Franco Chilena (Chile) 1967-19??
- Rambler del Peru S.A (Peru): 1963-1966
- Industria Automotriz Peruana S.A (Peru): 1966-1970

Africa

- National Motor Assemblers (South Africa): 1964-1967
- Rosslyn Motor Assemblers (South Africa): 1968
- Motor Assemblies Limited (South Africa): 1969-1970

Middle East

- Pars Khodro (Iran): 1967-1974

== Trademark ==
American Motors stopped producing cars using the Rambler trademark in 1970. In 1973, Action Age Incorporated wanted to register "Scrambler" for an off-highway vehicle and, in a case before the Trademark Trial and Appeal Board, contended that the trademark Rambler had been abandoned. This registration was opposed by AMC and the court determined that even though the manufacturing of Ramblers ended, the trademark was not abandoned because AMC continued to have commercial activities such as parts with the Rambler name on the boxes as well as franchising dealers that retained Rambler in their name or marketed used cars under the Rambler trademark./

The Rambler trademark registration expired on 12 December 1994, because Chrysler (the company that acquired AMC in 1987) did not file an affidavit of continued use. However, it was claimed by Chrysler as a retro or heritage mark that "had built an affinity and emotional connection with the consumer as a result of the original product that was in the marketplace, and continues to have nostalgia appeal with consumers who are still interested in acquiring products built around the mark’s core values and replicates the markets and the mark itself." In a 2008 case before the Trademark Trial and Appeal Board, the United States Patent and Trademark Office determined that Chrysler continued to have products licensed in connection with the Rambler mark for automobiles and thus sufficiently related to automobiles so that consumers would ascribe a single source to the products. Chrysler, as the successor company, was able to "prove non-abandonment by demonstrating that there were many Rambler cars (and related supplies) bearing the mark still in use. The board ruled that Chrysler "has priority of use, at the very least with respect to key rings, calendars, decals, specification sheets, and owner's manuals, all relating to Rambler automobiles."
