= Gaslight Tavern =

The Gaslight Tavern was located at 1241 Oread (as in 13th & Oread on The Hill), just off the University of Kansas campus in Lawrence, Kansas, and was right next (west) to the Abington Book Shop (the "City Lights" of the midwest) that was owned by the beat poet, John E. Fowler (publisher of GRIST) and wife Sara. The Gaslight was a popular hangout for students and non-students alike over several decades, from the peaceful times of the Silent Generation to the more turbulent times of the Counter Culture.

The Gaslight has been featured in poetry and fiction. During the era of Folk music, the Gaslight opened the stage to local artists. Later, beat poet George Edward Kimball held 'court' at the Gaslight. George was noted for running for Douglas County sheriff in 1970 and losing the race; however, Phillip Hill was voted in, and removed from his office, as justice of the peace.

KU student Nick Rice was shot to death in front of the Gaslight by local police during an anti-war riot in summer 1970. On the night of July 16, 1970, KU freshman, Rick "Tiger" Dowdell was shot in downtown Lawrence.

The building burned in the '70s, under suspicious conditions. The original location of the Gaslight is now a parking area for the KU Student Union which was burned in the 1970 riots.

In its heyday, the Gaslight, as a bar and grill, offered varieties of 3.2% American lager and adequate hamburgers. Entertainment consisted of juke-box music, pinball machines, and a pool table (and conversation). Live entertainment was not a regular event.

== History ==
The establishment was known as Oread Cafe in 1918. It was Brick's Cafe in the 1940s and 1950s. In April 1948, Congress of Racial Equality (CORE) had a sit-in at the Cafe. The protestors included black and white students. Counter protestors "physically removed the protestors from the restaurant."

From 1963 to 1969, the Gaslight Tavern was owned by Donald L. Ebeling who was known as Cueball. He died in Topeka in 2008. Reginald Scarborough bought the tavern in 1969.

== Gaslight Gardens ==
The Gaslight Gardens reopened on March 17, 2012 and uses a "European beer garden motif."

Earlier, the establishment was known as Gaslight Tavern for several years, operated in north Lawrence, Kansas as a bar and coffeehouse and offered live entertainment on a regular basis. While the interior only offered a capacity of 39, there was an unusually large patio area.

The Gaslight did not renew their lease for 2009 and was closed temporarily. It reopened on July 3, 2009.
