= Gaslamp (disambiguation) =

A gaslamp is a device that produces light by burning gas.

Gaslamp may also refer to:

- Gaslamp Quarter, San Diego, historical heart of San Diego
  - Gaslamp Quarter (San Diego Trolley station)
- Gaslamp fantasy, a subgenre of historical and fantasy fiction
- Gaslamp Games, a software development company
