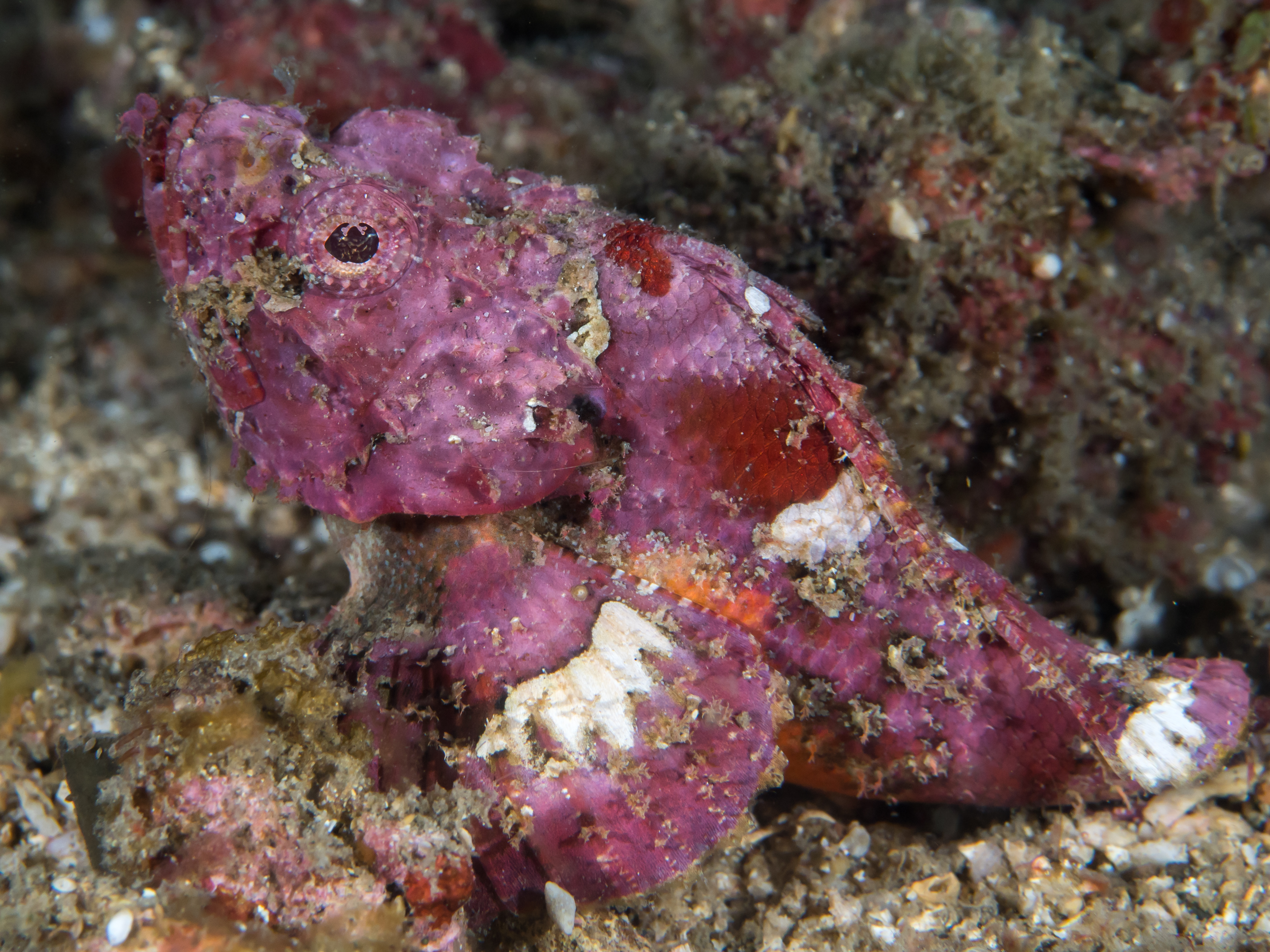

Conservation status
- Least Concern (IUCN 3.1)

Scientific classification
- Kingdom: Animalia
- Phylum: Chordata
- Class: Actinopterygii
- Order: Perciformes
- Family: Scorpaenidae
- Genus: Scorpaenopsis
- Species: S. macrochir

Binomial name
- Scorpaenopsis macrochir J. D. Ogilby, 1910

= Flasher scorpionfish =

Species of fish

The flasher scorpionfish ( Scorpaenopsis macrochir), or rough humpback scorpionfish is a species of venomous marine ray-finned fish belonging to the family Scorpaenidae, the scorpionfishes. This species is found in the western Pacific Ocean.

== Taxonomy ==
The flasher scorpionfish was first formally described in 1910 by the Australian ichthyologist James Douglas Ogilby with the type locality given as Bulwer Island near Brisbane. The specific name macrpocheir means "large hand", a reference to the large pectoral fins.

== Description ==
The flasher scorpionfish has a broad, spiny head with a wide space between the eyes, a highly arched back, and a divided upper opercular spine. It has 12 spines in its dorsal fin and nine soft rays and the anal fin has three spines and five soft rays. The general color of this fish is brown mottled with white, and it can grow to a length of 13 cm (5 in). The large pectoral fin is flushed with yellow and orange on its inside and has a complete, broad black band near its margin and no large back spots. This fish is one of five very similar species of humpback scorpionfish and can be distinguished from S. diabolus, S. gibbosa, and S. obtusa by the markings on the inside of the pectoral fin. From S. neglecta it can also be differentiated by the presence of two to six points on the nasal spine. This species attains a maximum total length of 13.6 cm (5.4 in)

== Distribution and habitat ==
It is indigenous to the tropical and subtropical waters of western and northwest Australia, the Moluccas, and the Philippines to the Marquesas and Society Islands, north to Ryukyu Islands, south to Rowley Shoals, Tonga, and the Mariana and Caroline Islands in Micronesia. S. macrochir is typically found on soft substrates, where it sometimes buries itself, camouflaged among rubble where it lies in wait for passing prey. It can be found at depths between 1 and 80 m (3 ft 3 in and 262 ft 6 in).

== Biology ==
The flasher scorpionfish is either found as a solitary fish or in pairs. They are nocturnal ambush predators that are camouflaged among the coral rubble, as well as partially burying themselves in the substrate. Here they wait for prey such as small fishes to come within range and be engulfed in the large mouth. They have grooves along their fin spines which contain venom glands.

== Utilisation ==
The flasher scorpionfish is rare in the aquarium trade.

== See also ==
- List of marine aquarium fish species
