= Psilus =

Psilus may refer to:

- Psilus (wasp), a genus of wasps in the family Diapriidae
- Psilus, a genus of fishes in the family Eleotridae, synonym of Bostrychus
- Psilus, a genus of beetles in the family Carabidae, synonym of Syleter
