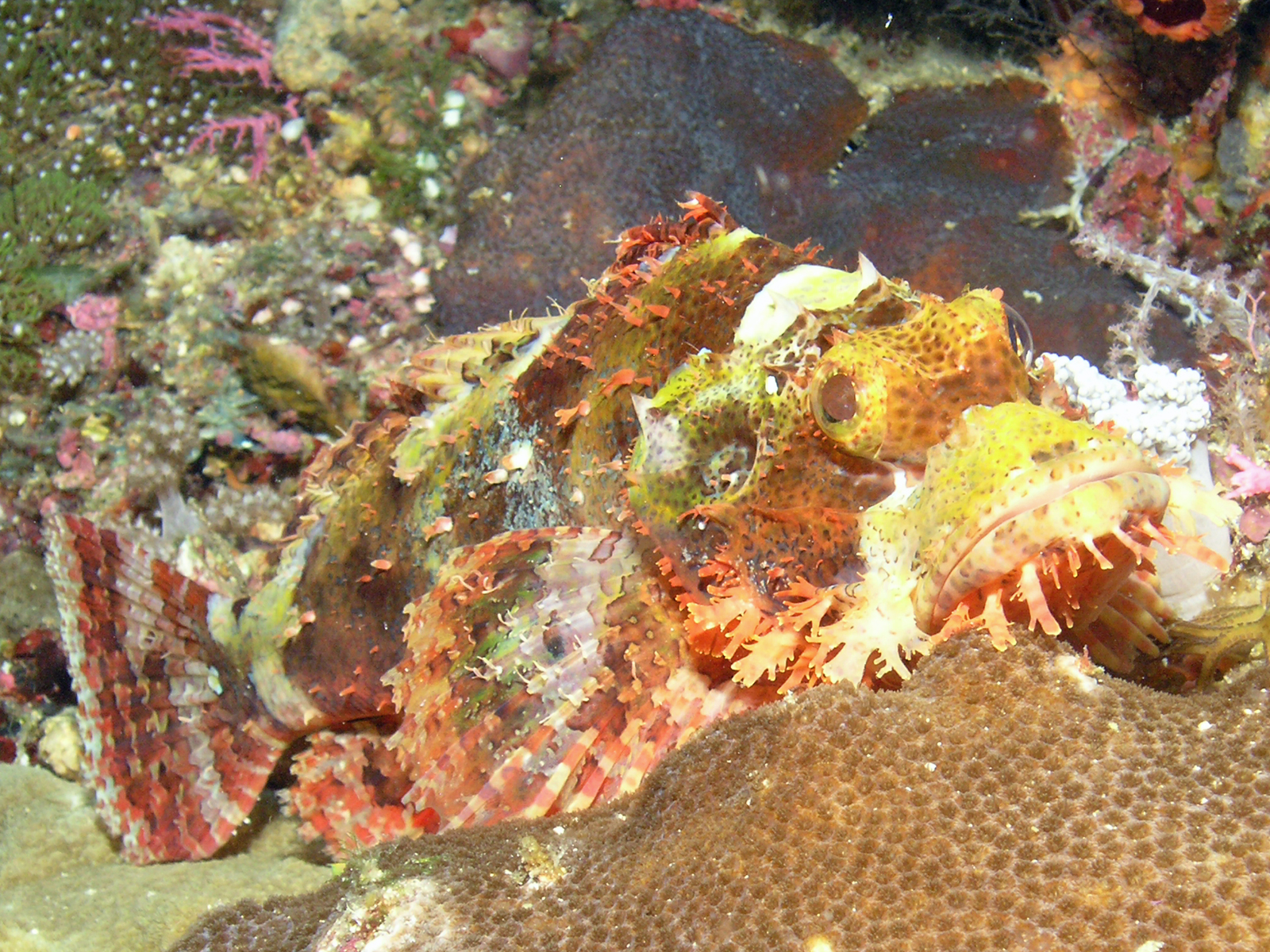
- Papuan scorpionfish at Bunaken, North Sulawesi

Conservation status
- Least Concern (IUCN 3.1)

Scientific classification
- Kingdom: Animalia
- Phylum: Chordata
- Class: Actinopterygii
- Order: Perciformes
- Family: Scorpaenidae
- Genus: Scorpaenopsis
- Species: S. papuensis

Binomial name
- Scorpaenopsis papuensis (G. Cuvier, 1829)

Synonyms
- Scorpaena papuensis Cuvier, 1829

= Scorpaenopsis papuensis =

Species of fish

Scorpaenopsis papuensis, the Papuan scorpionfish, is a species of venomous marine ray-finned fish belonging to the family Scorpaenidae, the scorpionfishes. It is found in the Indo-West Pacific.

== Taxonomy ==
Scorpaenopsis papusensis was first formally described as Scorpaena papuensis in 1829 by the French zoologist Georges Cuvier with the type locality given as New Guinea. The specific name is the suffix -ensis added to Papua, another name for New Guinea, indicating the type locality.

== Description ==
Scorpaenopsis papuensis has 12 spines and 9 soft rays in its dorsal fin and 3 spines and 5 soft rays in its anal fin. The length of the snout is greater than the orbital diameter. There is a dark purplish blotch on the rear of the spiny part of the dorsal fin. Juveniles have large, forward pointing tentacles over the eyes. The basic colour is mottled reddish brown on the body and fins. It has tentacles and skin flaps on the jaw and chin. It is able to change the colour of its body to enhance its camouflage compared to substrate it rests on. The maximum published total length reached by the Papuan scorpionfish is 25 cm (9.8 in). This species may be distinguished from the similar raggy scorpionfish (Scorpaenopsis venosa) by having a flattened intraorbital space with no occipital pit.

== Distribution and habitat ==
Scorpaenopsis papuensis is found in the Indo-West Pacific from western Indonesia to French Polynesia, north as far as the Ryukyu Islands of southern Japan and south to the Great Barrier Reef and New Caledonia. In Australian waters this species is found at Houtman Abrolhos north to the bortwest of Port Hedland in Western Australia, on the Cartier Reef in the Timor Sea, and off the far northern Great Barrier Reef to Holmes Reef in the Coral Sea, as well as at Middleton Reef in the Tasman Sea. It is found at depths of between 1 and 40 m (3 ft 3 in and 131 ft 3 in) in coral and rocky areas and also in sandy coastal slopes, estuaries and lagoons, frequently found in rubble areas covered in algae.

== Biology ==
Scorpaenopsis papuensis is a solitary, cryptic species which is an ambush predator of fishes, waiting for prey to approach near enough to be engulfed by its mouth and eaten. The Papuan scorpionfish exhibits biofluorescence, that is, when illuminated by blue or ultraviolet light, it re-emits it as red, and appears differently than under white light illumination. Biofluorescence may assist in intraspecific communication and camouflage.

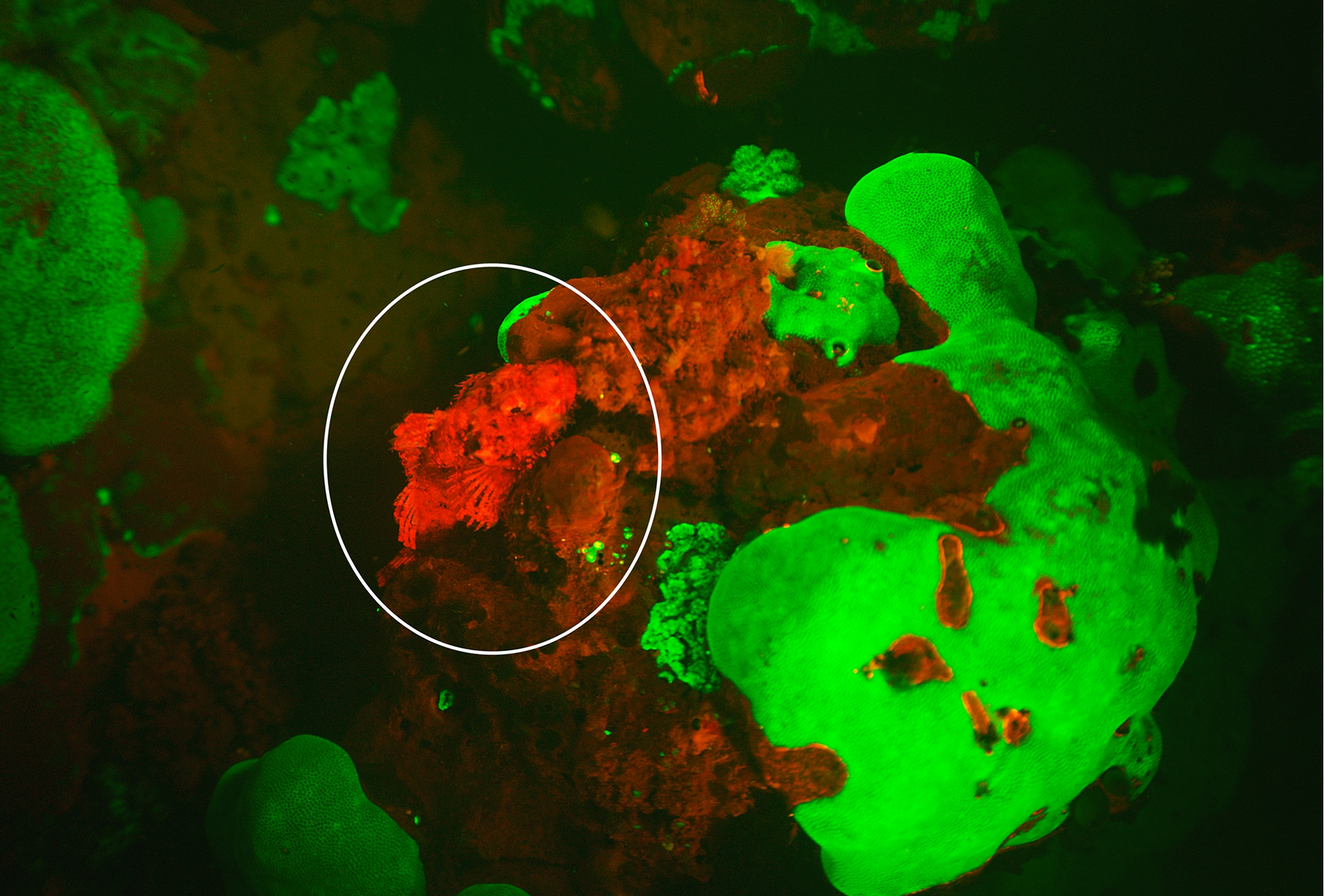
Biofluorescence of Scorpaenopsis papuensis at night at the Solomon Islands. The fish (circled) is blending with a red-fluorescing algae

== Utilisation ==
Scorpaenopsis papuensis occasionally makes its way into the aquarium trade.
