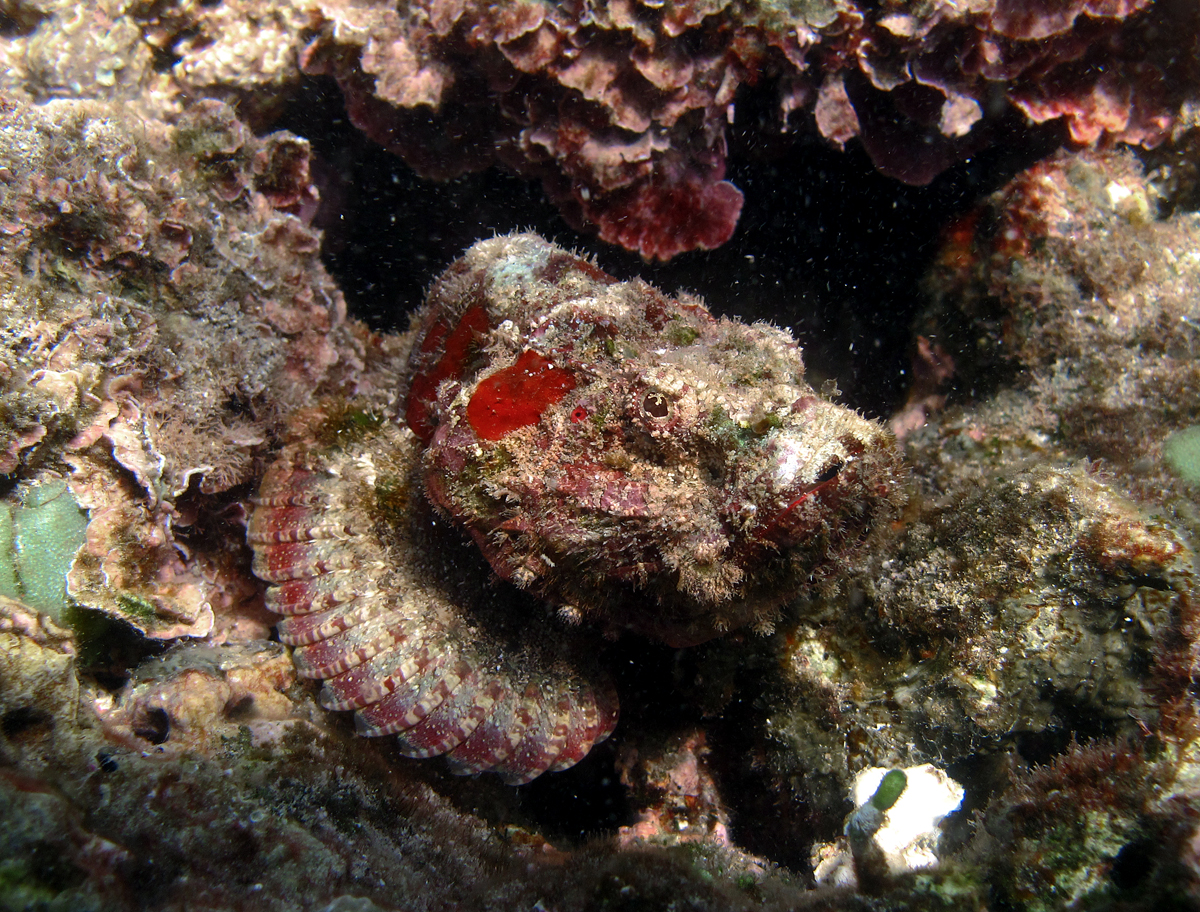
- Humpback scorpionfish (Scorpaenopsis gibbosa)

Scientific classification
- Kingdom: Animalia
- Phylum: Chordata
- Class: Actinopterygii
- Order: Perciformes
- Family: Scorpaenidae
- Subfamily: Scorpaeninae
- Genus: Scorpaenopsis; Heckel, 1837

Type species
- Scorpaena nesogallica G. Cuvier, 1829

Synonyms
- Dendroscorpaena J. L. B. Smith, 1957; Scorpaenichthys Bleeker, 1856

= Scorpaenopsis =

Genus of fishes

Scorpaenopsis is a genus of marine ray-finned fish belonging to the family Scorpaenidae, the scorpionfishes. The fishes in this genus are found in the Indian and Pacific Ocean.

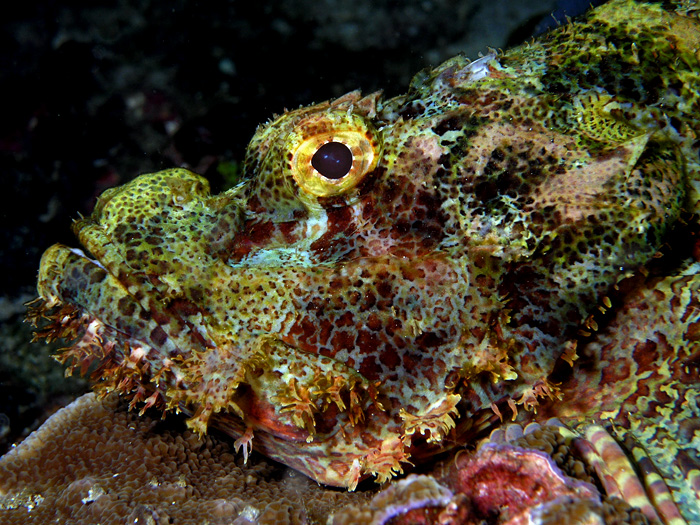
Tasseled scorpionfish (S. oxycephala)

== Taxonomy ==
Scorpaenopsis was first formally described as a genus in 1837 by the Austrian taxidermist, zoologist, and ichthyologist Johann Jakob Heckel. In 1876 Pieter Bleeker designated Scorpaena nesogallica, which had been described in 1829 by Georges Cuvier from Mauritius, as its type species. S. nesogallica was later shown to be a junior synonym of Scorpaena gibbosa which had been described by Marcus Elieser Bloch and Johann Gottlob Schneider in 1801 with "America" erroneously given as the type locality of this Indian Ocean species. This genus is classified within the tribe Scorpaenini, in the subfamily Scorpaeninae of the family Scorpaenidae. The genus name Scorpaenopsis means "having the appearance of Scorpaena, the genus the type species was originally classified within.

== Species ==
The 28 recognized species in this genus are:

- Scorpaenopsis altirostris C. H. Gilbert, 1905
- Scorpaenopsis barbata (Rüppell, 1838) (bearded scorpionfish)
- Scorpaenopsis brevifrons Eschmeyer & J. E. Randall, 1975 (bigmouth scorpionfish)
- Scorpaenopsis cacopsis O. P. Jenkins, 1901 (Jenkins' scorpionfish)
- Scorpaenopsis cirrosa (Thunberg, 1793) (weedy stingfish)
- Scorpaenopsis cotticeps Fowler, 1938 (sculpin scorpionfish)
- Scorpaenopsis crenulata Motomura & Causse, 2011 (serrated deepwater scorpionfish)
- Scorpaenopsis diabolus (G. Cuvier, 1829) (false stonefish)
- Scorpaenopsis eschmeyeri J. E. Randall & D. W. Greenfield, 2004
- Scorpaenopsis furneauxi Whitley, 1959 (Furneaux scorpionfish)
- Scorpaenopsis gibbosa (Bloch & J. G. Schneider, 1801) (humpbacked scorpionfish)
- Scorpaenopsis gilchristi (J. L. B. Smith, 1957) (Gilchrist's scorpionfish)
- Scorpaenopsis insperatus Motomura, 2004 (Sydney scorpionfish)
- Scorpaenopsis lactomaculata (Herre, 1945) (whiteblotched scorpionfish)
- Scorpaenopsis longispina J. E. Randall & Eschmeyer, 2001
- Scorpaenopsis macrochir J. D. Ogilby, 1910 (flasher scorpionfish)
- Scorpaenopsis neglecta Heckel, 1837 (yellowfin scorpionfish)
- Scorpaenopsis obtusa J. E. Randall & Eschmeyer, 2001 (shortsnout scorpionfish)
- Scorpaenopsis orientalis J. E. Randall & Eschmeyer, 2001
- Scorpaenopsis oxycephala (Bleeker, 1849) (tasseled scorpionfish)
- Scorpaenopsis papuensis (G. Cuvier, 1829) (Papuan scorpionfish)
- Scorpaenopsis pluralis J. E. Randall & Eschmeyer, 2001
- Scorpaenopsis possi J. E. Randall & Eschmeyer, 2001
- Scorpaenopsis pusilla J. E. Randall & Eschmeyer, 2001
- Scorpaenopsis ramaraoi J. E. Randall & Eschmeyer, 2001
- Scorpaenopsis rubrimarginata R. Fricke, Durville & Mulochau, 2013
- Scorpaenopsis venosa (G. Cuvier, 1829) (raggy scorpionfish)
- Scorpaenopsis vittapinna J. E. Randall & Eschmeyer, 2001

== Characteristics ==
Scorpaenopsis scorpionfishes are characterised by having 12 spines in the dorsal fin and 3 spines in the anal fin. They do not have any teeth on the palatine. They have some black colouration between the first and the third spines in the dorsal fin. They have a strongly compressed head and no less than 3 suborbital spines. The smallest species is S. rubrimarginata which has a maximum total length of 24 mm (0.94 in) while the largest is the false stonefish (S. diabolus).

== Distribution ==
Scorpaenopsis scorpionfishes are found in the Indian and Pacific Oceans from the Red Sea and the coasts of Eastern Africa into the Pacific where it extends as Far East as Hawaii, north to Japan and south to Australia.
