= Scorpaenopsis pluralis =

Conservation status
- Data Deficient (IUCN 3.1)

Scientific classification
- Kingdom: Animalia
- Phylum: Chordata
- Class: Actinopterygii
- Order: Perciformes
- Family: Scorpaenidae
- Genus: Scorpaenopsis
- Species: S. pluralis

Binomial name
- Scorpaenopsis pluralis J. E. Randall & Eschmeyer, 2002

Species of fish

Scorpaenopsis pluralis is a species of venomous marine ray-finned fish belonging to the family Scorpaenidae, the scorpionfishes. This species is found in the eastern-central Pacific Ocean around Hawaii.

== Description ==
This species reaches a length of 7.4 cm (2.9 in).
