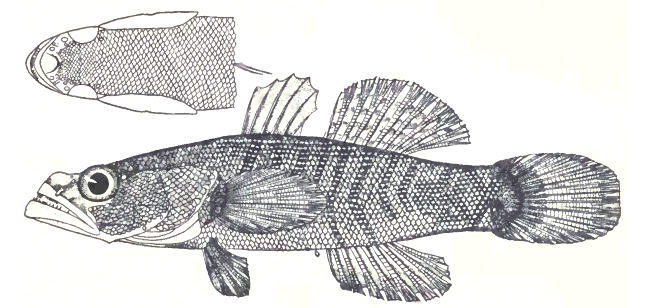

Conservation status
- Critically Endangered (IUCN 3.1)

Scientific classification
- Kingdom: Animalia
- Phylum: Chordata
- Class: Actinopterygii
- Order: Gobiiformes
- Family: Butidae
- Genus: Bostrychus
- Species: B. expatria

Binomial name
- Bostrychus expatria (Herre, 1927)

Synonyms
- Boroda expatria Herre, 1927; Oxyeleotris expatria (Herre, 1927)

= Bostrychus expatria =

Species of fish

Bostrychus expatria is a species of freshwater fish in the family Butidae endemic to Lake Manguao on the island of Palawan in the Philippines.

== Anatomy and morphology ==
Bostrychus expatria is a small fish reaching a length of 14.4 centimetres (5.7 in). They appear as standard members of their family, with non-hydrodynamically-shaped bodies typical of bottom-dwelling fish. It possesses two completely separate dorsal fins, the first one supported by spines. The caudal fin is truncately-shaped, usually not much thicker than the peduncle itself. Its eyes are located dorsally, another trait commonly seen in benthic fish.

== Range and distribution ==
Bostrychus expatria has a single known population that can be found only in Lake Manguao in the Philippines. Lake Manguao is a freshwater lake located in the hilly areas in the northern part of the Philippine island of Palawan. The lake has at least four brooks draining into it, yet it has no rivers draining out from it. O. expatria shares the lake with at least two other endemic species of fish from the family Cyprinidae.

== Ecology ==
Owing to the remoteness of its habitat, there have been extremely few studies on this species. The few ones that have been done describe the fish as a benthic species, spending much of its time resting on the lake's bottom. Despite its size, B. expatria is predatory, known to feed mostly on the small crustaceans that make the lake's muddy bottom their home. It has also been known to ingest small fishes.

== Importance to humans ==
As a small freshwater fish in an island with rich marine resources, B. expatria has no known commercial value. The fish may be caught as bycatch by small cast nets as fishing in the lake is done by the local population. It is known as bulokot by the natives living around the lake.

== Conservation ==
In 1996, the World Conservation Monitoring Centre assessed the fauna of Lake Manguao and B. expatria (as Boroda expatria) was classified as Vulnerable. A further assessment on 7 September 2020 revised this to Critically Endangered. As B. expatria has one known population in a single freshwater lake, its fate is inextricably tied to that of its home lake. The fish population is extremely vulnerable to anthropogenic disturbance such as pollution and overfishing, and a slight disturbance to the balance of the lake could send the species to extinction. In theory, the entire island of Palawan has been declared a wildlife preserve which should ensure the survival of the species, but wildlife laws are rarely enforced or followed in the country.

Tilapia, a fish known for disrupting and destroying the natural balance of the ecosystems it invades, was introduced into the lake in 1992. The presence of this voracious species may drive B. expatria into extinction.

== Etymology and taxonomic history ==
The species name, expatria was originally chosen by Herre to describe the fish as an expatriate.

Bostrychus expatria was originally described by Herre as Boroda expatria. Boroda was derived from the Visayan word borod, which was used by the natives of the lake to refer to goby-like fishes. The name remained until 2021 when it was listed in the genus Bostrychus (as Bostrychus expatria) and so featured in Eschmeyer's Catalog of Fishes.
