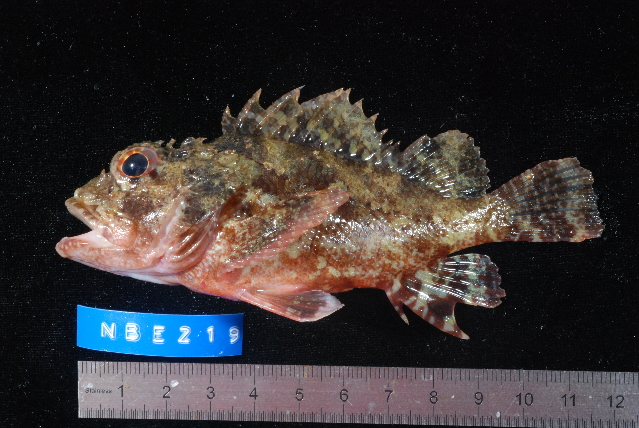

Conservation status
- Data Deficient (IUCN 3.1)

Scientific classification
- Kingdom: Animalia
- Phylum: Chordata
- Class: Actinopterygii
- Order: Perciformes
- Family: Scorpaenidae
- Genus: Scorpaenopsis
- Species: S. longispina

Binomial name
- Scorpaenopsis longispina J. E. Randall & Eschmeyer, 2002

= Scorpaenopsis longispina =

Species of fish

Scorpaenopsis longispina is a species of venomous marine ray-finned fish belonging to the family Scorpaenidae, the scorpionfishes. This species is found in the western Indian Ocean.

== Description ==
This species reaches a length of 9.2 cm (3.6 in).
