= Scorpaenopsis ramaraoi =

Conservation status
- Least Concern (IUCN 3.1)

Scientific classification
- Kingdom: Animalia
- Phylum: Chordata
- Class: Actinopterygii
- Order: Perciformes
- Family: Scorpaenidae
- Genus: Scorpaenopsis
- Species: S. ramaraoi

Binomial name
- Scorpaenopsis ramaraoi J. E. Randall & Eschmeyer, 2002

Species of fish

Scorpaenopsis ramaraoi, Rama Rao's scorpionfish, is a species of venomous marine ray-finned fish belonging to the family Scorpaenidae, the scorpionfishes. This species is found in the Indo-West Pacific from Pakistan to New Britain and Papua New Guinea.

== Etymology ==
The fish is named in honor of the late Kaza V. Rama Rao who assisted the authors in the early research on Scorpaenopsis.

== Description ==
This species reaches a length of 20.8 cm (8.2 in).
