= Poss's scorpionfish =

Conservation status
- Least Concern (IUCN 3.1)

Scientific classification
- Kingdom: Animalia
- Phylum: Chordata
- Class: Actinopterygii
- Order: Perciformes
- Family: Scorpaenidae
- Genus: Scorpaenopsis
- Species: S. possi

Binomial name
- Scorpaenopsis possi J. E. Randall & Eschmeyer, 2001

Species of fish

Poss's scorpionfish (Scorpaenopsis possi) is a species of venomous marine ray-finned fish belonging to the family Scorpaenidae, the scorpionfishes. It is found in the Indo-Pacific region. It occasionally makes its way into the aquarium trade.

== Taxonomy ==
Poss's scorpionfish was first formally described in 2001 by the American ichthyologists John E. Randall and William N. Eschmeyer with the type locality given as Pitcairn Island. The specific name honours the American ichthyologist Stuart G. Poss.

== Description ==
Poss's scorpionfish has a large head, large eyes and large pectoral fins the snout is shorter than that of other scorpionfish species. There are either no cirri above the eyes, or those that are present are markedly smaller than the eye. There are 12 spines and 9 soft rays in the dorsal fin and 3 spines and 5 soft rays in the anal fin. There is a pretympanic spine, no other species of Scorpaenopsis scorpionfish has this feature, this is connected by a low ridge to the postocular spine, a feature absent in juveniles. This species is quite fifficult to identify and is similar to other Scorpaenopsis scorpionfishes when observed in the wild. Thetassels on the lower jaw are shorter and finer, it has large scales with 43-50 scales along the lateral line. It frequently shows a white patch underneath and to the frontof the eye as well as a dark triangular patch below eye. This species attains a naximum published standard length of 19.4 cm (7.6 in).

== Distribution and habitat ==
Poss's scorpionfish has a wide Indo-Pacific distribution. It is found along the coast of eastern Africa from the Gulf of Suez to South Africa, the islands of the western Indian Ocean, the Maldives and Laccadive Islands, the islands of the eastern Andaman Sea, through Indonesia east to French Polynesia and north to Japan. It is absent from the southwestern Pacific and Fiji where it is replaced by S. eschmeyeri. This species is found at depths between 2 and 55 m (6 ft 7 in and 180 ft 5 in) on rock or coral substrates.

== Biology ==
Poss's scorpionfish is an ambush predator that waits for smaller fishes to come into reach. They are typically solitary. This species has venomous spines in its fins.

== See also ==
- List of marine aquarium fish species
