= Scorpaenopsis orientalis =

Scientific classification
- Kingdom: Animalia
- Phylum: Chordata
- Class: Actinopterygii
- Order: Perciformes
- Family: Scorpaenidae
- Genus: Scorpaenopsis
- Species: S. orientalis

Binomial name
- Scorpaenopsis orientalis J. E. Randall & Eschmeyer, 2002

Species of fish

Scorpaenopsis orientalis is a species of venomous marine ray-finned fish belonging to the family Scorpaenidae, the scorpionfishes. This species is found in the north-western Pacific Ocean around Japan.

== Description ==
This species reaches a length of 27.8 cm (10.9 in).
