= Scorpaenopsis vittapinna =

Bandfin scorpionfish

Conservation status
- Least Concern (IUCN 3.1)

Scientific classification
- Kingdom: Animalia
- Phylum: Chordata
- Class: Actinopterygii
- Division: Teleostei
- Order: Perciformes
- Family: Scorpaenidae
- Genus: Scorpaenopsis
- Species: S. vittapinna

Binomial name
- Scorpaenopsis vittapinna J. E. Randall & Eschmeyer, 2002

Species of fish

Scorpaenopsis vittapinna, the bandfin scorpionfish, is a species of marine ray-finned fish belonging to the family Scorpaenidae, the scorpionfishes, lionfishes and related taxa. This scorpionfish has a wide Indo-Pacific distribution. Like all scorpionfishes it is venomous.

== Taxonomy ==
Scorpaenopsis vittapinna was first formally described in 2002 by the American ichthyologists John Ernest Randall and William N. Eschmeyer with its type locality given as a reef in Sodwana Bay in KwaZulu-Natal, South Africa, from a depth of 27–28 m (89–92 ft). It is classified in the genus Scorpaenopsis which is placed within the subfamily Scorpaeninae, the typical scorpionfishes, of the family Scorpaenidae which includes the lionfishes, rockfishes and related taxa. The Scorpaenidae is classified in the suborder Scorpaenoidei of the largest fish order, the Perciformes.

== Etymology ==
Scorpaenopsis vittapinna is a member of the genus Scorpaenopsis, this name suffixes -opsis, meaning "having the appearance of", onto the genus name Scorpaena. The specific name, vittapinna, combines vitta, meaning "band", with pinna, which means "fin", a =n allusion to the dark horizontal bands across the anal and pelvic fins..

== Description ==
Scorpaenopsis vittapinna has its dorsal fin supported by 12 spines and 9^{1}/_{2} soft rays while its anal fin contains 3 spines and 5^{1}/_{2} soft rays. The upper jaw extands as far as the rear edge of the eye and the lower jaw has tentacles on its outer edge with the tentacles at the symphysis normally being the largest by some way. It has a shallow pit on the occipital and a deep, relatively short pit below and in front of the eye. There are 4 spines on the suborbital ridge and a small spine on the lachrymal. The spine on the cheek is almost double the length of the parietal spine. The upper spine on the gill cover has 3 or 4 points. The coloration of the body is a complicated combination of red, brown, black and grey markings on a tan or whitish background. There is typically a indistinct black spot on the body under the spiny part of the dorsal fin with the gill cover having large, irregular, red or reddish brown blotches. There is an oblique reddish bar tunning from the middle spines of the dorsal fin towards the lateral line with a less distinct oblique red bar on the fisr few rays of the dorsal fin. The pelvic fins are whitish at their bases with a wide dusky bar towards their margins. The caudal peduncle is normally pale and the caudal fin is mainly red or reddish brown, with 2 irregular wide bars running from top to bottom. This species reaches a total length of 8.5 cm (3.3 in).

== Distribution and habitat ==
Scorpaenopsis vittapinna has a wide Indo-Pacific distribution from the eastern coats of Africa between the Gulf of Aqaba south to Mozambique and KwaZulu-Natal through the Comoros, Seychelles, Mauritius and Maldives, east to Indonesia, Philippines, Taiwan, the Ogasawara Islands of Japan, Caroline Islands, New Guinea, Chesterfield Islands, Fiji, Wallis and Futuna, Samoa and the Society Islands. It is a rather uncommon fish which occurs on inshore reehs and coral rubble at depths between 2.5 and 28 m (8 ft 2 in and 91 ft 10 in).

== Venom ==
Scorpaenopsis vittapinna, like all scorpionfishes has venom in its spines. However, Fishbase say this species is harmless.
