= Scorpaenopsis brevifrons =

Conservation status
- Least Concern (IUCN 3.1)

Scientific classification
- Kingdom: Animalia
- Phylum: Chordata
- Class: Actinopterygii
- Order: Perciformes
- Family: Scorpaenidae
- Genus: Scorpaenopsis
- Species: S. brevifrons

Binomial name
- Scorpaenopsis brevifrons Eschmeyer & J. E. Randall, 1975

Species of fish

Scorpaenopsis brevifrons, the bigmouth scorpionfish, is a species of venomous marine ray-finned fish belonging to the family Scorpaenidae, the scorpionfishes. This species is endemic to Hawaiʻi.

== Description ==
The shortsnout scorpionfish has a blackspot, near its dorsal fin. It can be seen in many different colors, as its highly variable, such as red, pink, yellow, black, blue, and other color combinations. These color variations helps it to camouflage around rocky areas and reef habitats. It has a short snout, multiple dorsal spines, and venomous fin spines for protection against predators. The pectoral fin rays range from 17-19, however, usually the fin rays aren't 19. The snout length is 3.0 to 3.3 times to the head length, while its interorbital head width is 5.7-6.5 to the head length. It typically feeds on smaller fishes and crustaceans.

== Distribution and habitat ==
The shortsnout scorpionfish is endemic to Hawaiʻi. It inhabits inshore costal reef and sandy rubble areas around 40-100 feet at a temperature around 21-27°C.
