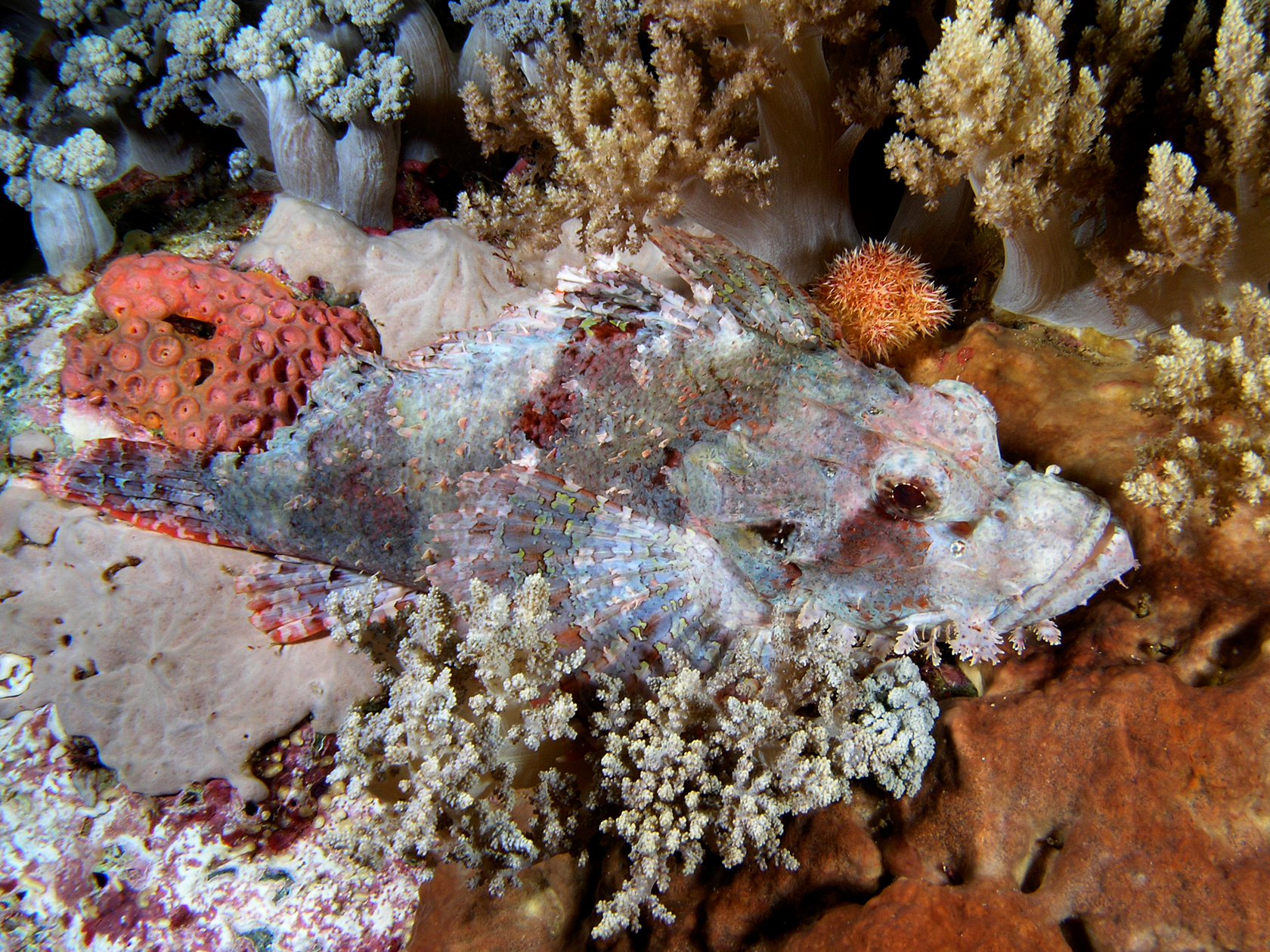

Conservation status
- Least Concern (IUCN 3.1)

Scientific classification
- Kingdom: Animalia
- Phylum: Chordata
- Class: Actinopterygii
- Order: Perciformes
- Family: Scorpaenidae
- Genus: Scorpaenopsis
- Species: S. neglecta

Binomial name
- Scorpaenopsis neglecta Heckel, 1837

= Scorpaenopsis neglecta =

Species of fish

Scorpaenopsis neglecta, the yellowfin scorpionfish or bandtail scorpionfish, is a species of venomous marine ray-finned fish belonging to the family Scorpaenidae, the scorpionfishes. It is found in the Indo-West Pacific.

== Taxonomy ==
Scorpaenopsis neglecta was first formally described in 1837 by the Austrian ichthyologist Johann Jakob Heckel with the type locality given as the "Sea of East Indies". The specific name neglecta means "neglected" or "overlooked", a reference Heckel did not explain, although he may have been suggesting that this species had previously been misidentified as S. nesogallica.

== Description ==
Scorpaenopsis neglecta has a highly arched nap and front part of the body which leads to a humpback appearance. It has a wide space between the eyes. There are 12 spines and 9 soft rays in its dorsal fin while its anal fin has 3 spines and 5 soft rays. There is a serrated ridge above the eye and the pterotic, lower posttemporal, and second suborbital spines are replaced by serrated ridges. The nuchal spine has 1 or 2 supplemental spines and the forward ridge of the lacrimal bone is serrated. The pattern of this scorpion fish is made up of blotches and mottling coloured to camouflage it. There is a dark reddish band across the outer part of the tail just in from the margin, and there is frequently a yellowish patch on the operculum. The inner surface of the pectoral fin does not have any dark spots and has a black band across the upper rays near their tips with small dark spots where the pectoral fin joins the body. This species reaches a maximum standard length of 19 cm (7.5 in).

== Distribution, habitat and biology ==
Scorpaenopsis neglecta has an Indo-West Pacific distribution, occurring as far west as India and Sri Lanka east to New Caledonia, north to southern Japan, and south to northern Australia, where it is found from Shark Bay in Western Australia to Wollongong in New South Wales. It is found on rock and coral reefs in shallow water, as well as on sand and mud substrates, at depths down to 40 m (130 ft). It is normally a solitary species. It has venom glands in its fin spines.
