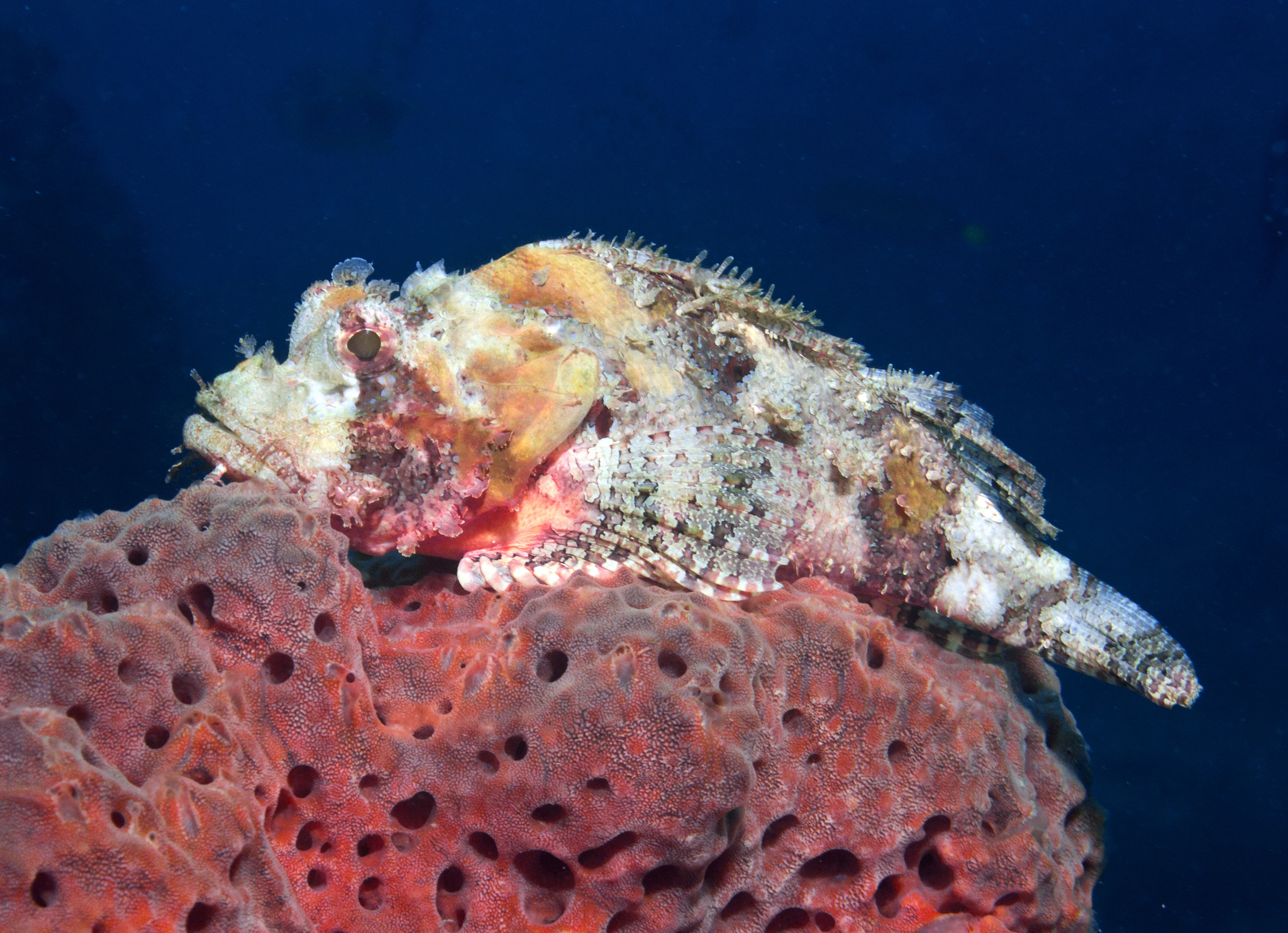

Conservation status
- Least Concern (IUCN 3.1)

Scientific classification
- Kingdom: Animalia
- Phylum: Chordata
- Class: Actinopterygii
- Order: Perciformes
- Family: Scorpaenidae
- Genus: Scorpaenopsis
- Species: S. eschmeyeri

Binomial name
- Scorpaenopsis eschmeyeri J. E. Randall & D. W. Greenfield, 2004

= Scorpaenopsis eschmeyeri =

Species of fish

Scorpaenopsis eschmeyeri is a species of venomous marine ray-finned fish belonging to the family Scorpaenidae, the scorpionfishes. This species is found in the south-western Pacific Ocean from Fiji to New Caledonia.

== Etymology ==
The fish is named for William N. Eschmeyer, in recognition of his research on the fishes of the family Scorpaenidae.

== Description ==
This species reaches a length of at least 11.5 cm (4.5 in).
