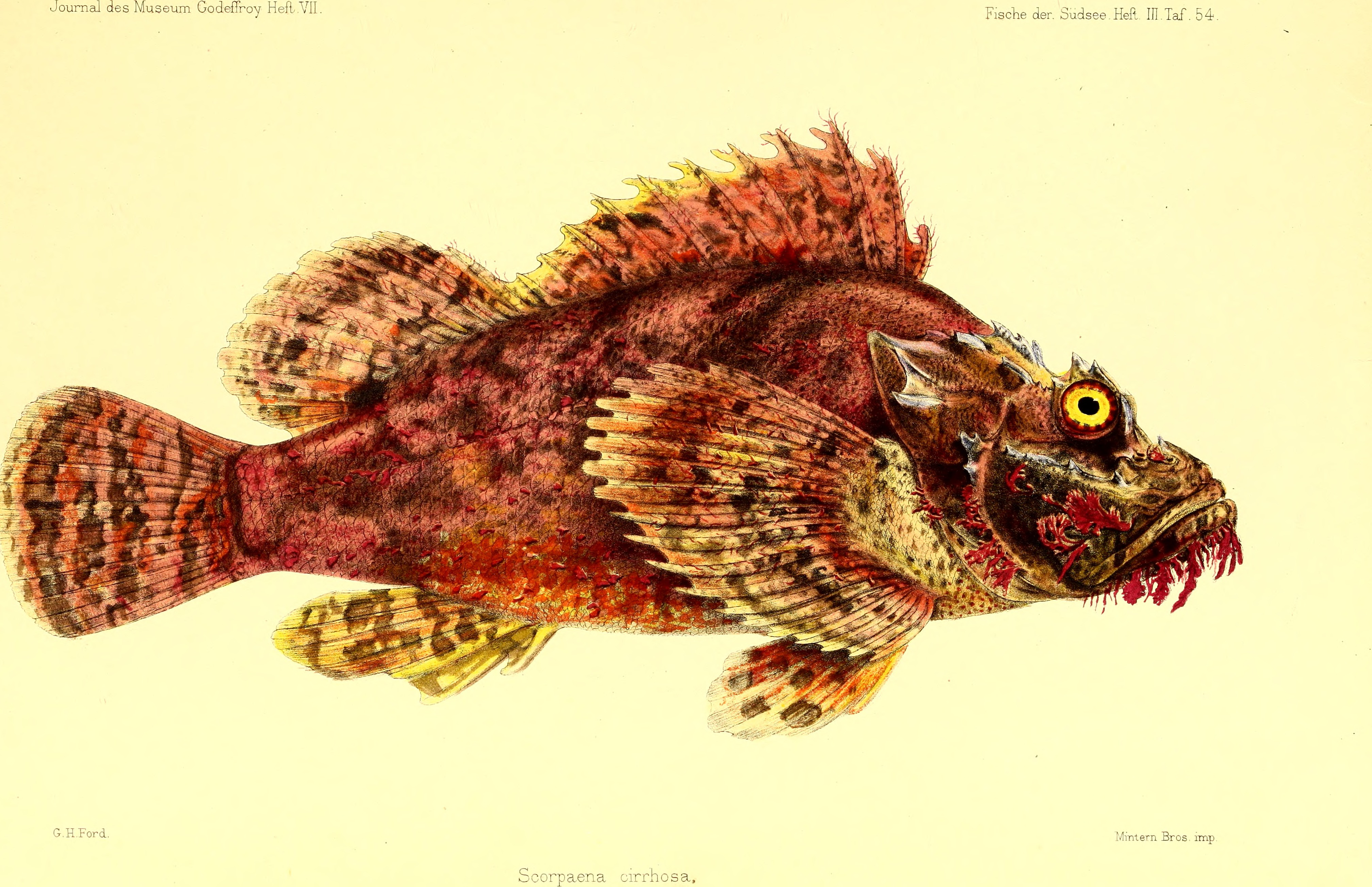

Scientific classification
- Kingdom: Animalia
- Phylum: Chordata
- Class: Actinopterygii
- Order: Perciformes
- Family: Scorpaenidae
- Genus: Scorpaenopsis
- Species: S. cirrosa

Binomial name
- Scorpaenopsis cirrosa (Thunberg, 1793)

Synonyms
- Perca cirrosa Thunberg, 1793; Dendroscorpaena cirrhosa (Thunberg, 1793); Scorpaena cirrhosa (Thunberg, 1793); Scorpaenopsis cirrhosa (Thunberg, 1793); Scorpaenopsis cirrhosus (Thunberg, 1793); Scorpaeopsis cirrhosa (Thunberg, 1793); Scorpaena leonina Richardson, 1846

= Scorpaenopsis cirrosa =

Weedy stingfish

Species of fish

Scorpaenopsis cirrosa, the weedy stingfish, is a species of venomous marine ray-finned fish belonging to the family Scorpaenidae, the scorpionfishes. It is found in the north-western Pacific Ocean from southern Japan and China south to Hong Kong and northern Taiwan.

== Description ==
This species reaches a length of 23.1 cm (9.1 in).
