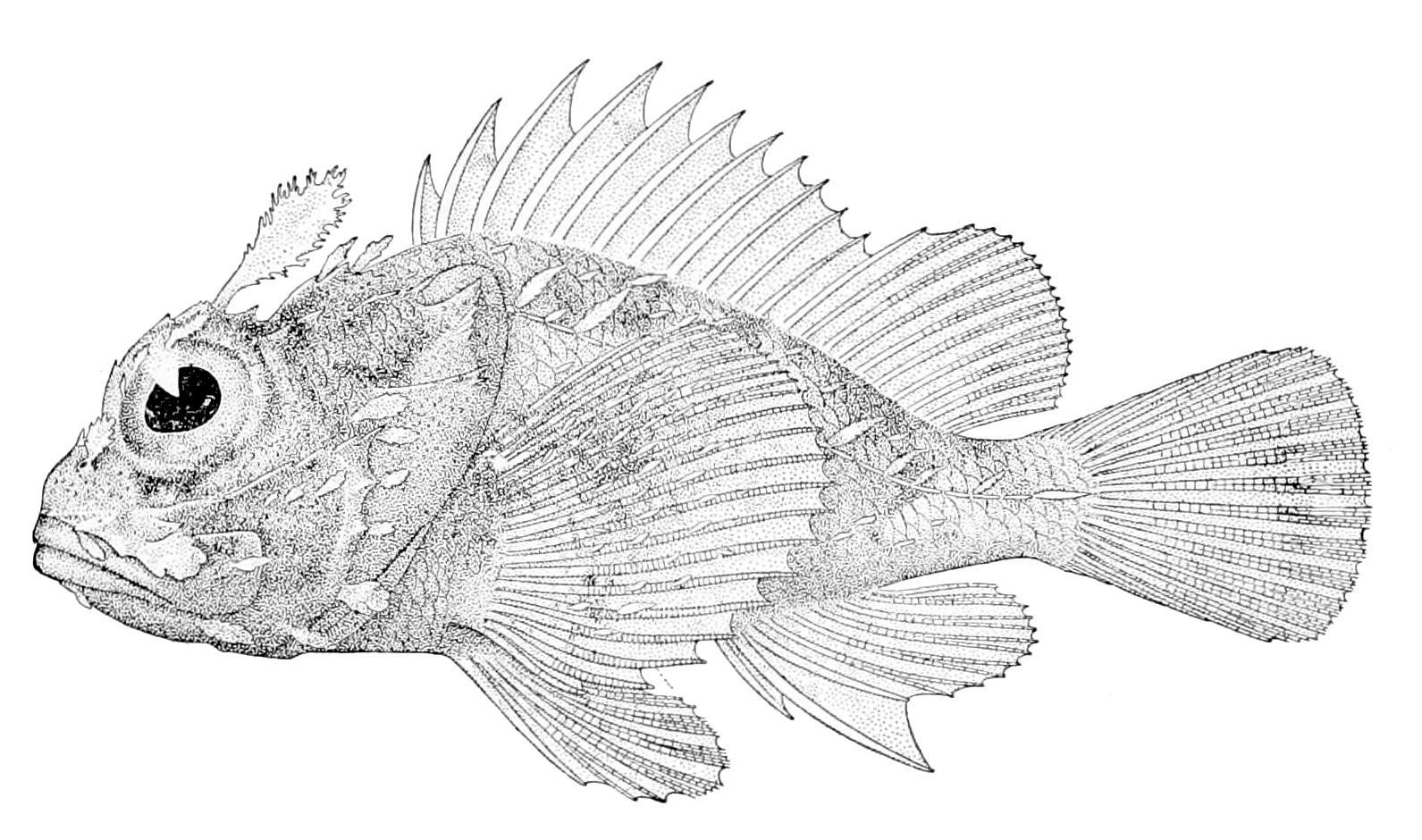

Conservation status
- Least Concern (IUCN 3.1)

Scientific classification
- Kingdom: Animalia
- Phylum: Chordata
- Class: Actinopterygii
- Order: Perciformes
- Family: Scorpaenidae
- Genus: Scorpaenopsis
- Species: S. altirostris

Binomial name
- Scorpaenopsis altirostris C. H. Gilbert, 1905

= Scorpaenopsis altirostris =

Species of fish

Scorpaenopsis altirostris is a species of venomous marine ray-finned fish belonging to the family Scorpaenidae, the scorpionfishes. This species is found in the eastern-central Pacific Ocean.

== Description ==
This species reaches a length of 4.6 cm (1.8 in).
