= Scorpaenopsis rubrimarginata =

Conservation status
- Data Deficient (IUCN 3.1)

Scientific classification
- Kingdom: Animalia
- Phylum: Chordata
- Class: Actinopterygii
- Order: Perciformes
- Family: Scorpaenidae
- Genus: Scorpaenopsis
- Species: S. rubrimarginata

Binomial name
- Scorpaenopsis rubrimarginata Fricke, Durville & Mulochau, 2013

Synonyms
- Scorpaenopsis rubrimarginatus Fricke, Durville & Mulochau, 2013

Species of fish

Scorpaenopsis rubrimarginata is a species of venomous marine ray-finned fish belonging to the family Scorpaenidae, the scorpionfishes. This species is found in the western Indian Ocean.

== Description ==
This species reaches a length of 2.4 cm (0.94 in).
