= Scorpaenopsis furneauxi =

Scientific classification
- Kingdom: Animalia
- Phylum: Chordata
- Class: Actinopterygii
- Order: Perciformes
- Family: Scorpaenidae
- Genus: Scorpaenopsis
- Species: S. furneauxi

Binomial name
- Scorpaenopsis furneauxi Whitley, 1959

Species of fish

Scorpaenopsis furneauxi, also known as Furneaux scorpionfish, is a species of venomous marine ray-finned fish belonging to the family Scorpaenidae, the scorpionfishes. This species is found in the western Pacific Ocean.

== Etymology ==
The fish is named in honor of Capt. Tobias Furneaux, an English navigator and Royal Navy officer who accompanied Captain James Cook on the second voyage of exploration, which included Australia, where this species happens to occur.

== Description ==
This species reaches a length of 9.6 cm (3.8 in).
