= Barred gudgeon =

Conservation status
- Least Concern (IUCN 3.1)

Scientific classification
- Kingdom: Animalia
- Phylum: Chordata
- Class: Actinopterygii
- Division: Teleostei
- Order: Gobiiformes
- Family: Butidae
- Genus: Bostrychus
- Species: B. zonatus

Binomial name
- Bostrychus zonatus M. C. W. Weber, 1907

Synonyms
- Bostrichthys zonatus (M. C. W. Weber, 1907)

Species of fish

Bostrychus zonatus, also known as the Barred gudgeon or sunset gudgeon, is a species of fish in the family Butidae native to Irian Jaya, Indonesia and Papua New Guinea where it can be found in fresh and brackish waters. This species can reach a length of 18.5 centimetres (7.3 in) SL.
