= Lake Manguao =

- Location within the Philippines
- Location: Palawan
- Coordinates: 10°45′48″N 119°32′47″E
- Type: lake
- Basin countries: Philippines

Lake Manguao is a lake located in the northernmost region of the island of Palawan in the Philippines. It harbors several endemic species of fish, such as the sleeper goby Oxyeleotris expatria.

== Bibliography ==
- "Lake Manguao". Wetlands of Southeast Asia. ASEAN Regional Center for Biodiversity Conservation. Archived from the original on 2007-09-28.
- "Lake Manguao: State of Conservation and Sustainable Development". Academe II. Kuweba ng Anak ng Lupa.
