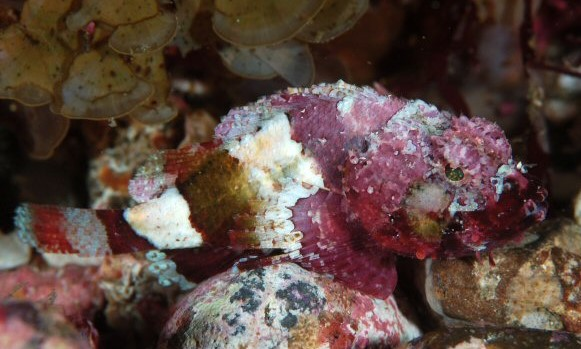

Conservation status
- Least Concern (IUCN 3.1)

Scientific classification
- Kingdom: Animalia
- Phylum: Chordata
- Class: Actinopterygii
- Order: Perciformes
- Family: Scorpaenidae
- Genus: Scorpaenopsis
- Species: S. cotticeps

Binomial name
- Scorpaenopsis cotticeps Fowler, 1938

= Scorpaenopsis cotticeps =

Species of fish

Scorpaenopsis cotticeps, the sculpin scorpionfish, is a species of venomous marine ray-finned fish belonging to the family Scorpaenidae, the scorpionfishes. This species is found in the Indo-West Pacific Ocean.

== Description ==
This species reaches a length of 6.3 cm (2.5 in).
