= Bostrychus aruensis =

Conservation status
- Data Deficient (IUCN 3.1)

Scientific classification
- Kingdom: Animalia
- Phylum: Chordata
- Class: Actinopterygii
- Order: Gobiiformes
- Family: Butidae
- Genus: Bostrychus
- Species: B. aruensis

Binomial name
- Bostrychus aruensis M. C. W. Weber, 1911

Synonyms
- Bostrichthys aruensis (M. C. W. Weber, 1911)

Species of fish

Bostrychus aruensis, the island gudgeon, is a species of fish in the family Eleotridae, an endemic fish of the Aru Islands, Indonesia, where it occurs in both fresh and brackish waters. It grows up to 18 centimetres (7.1 in) SL.
