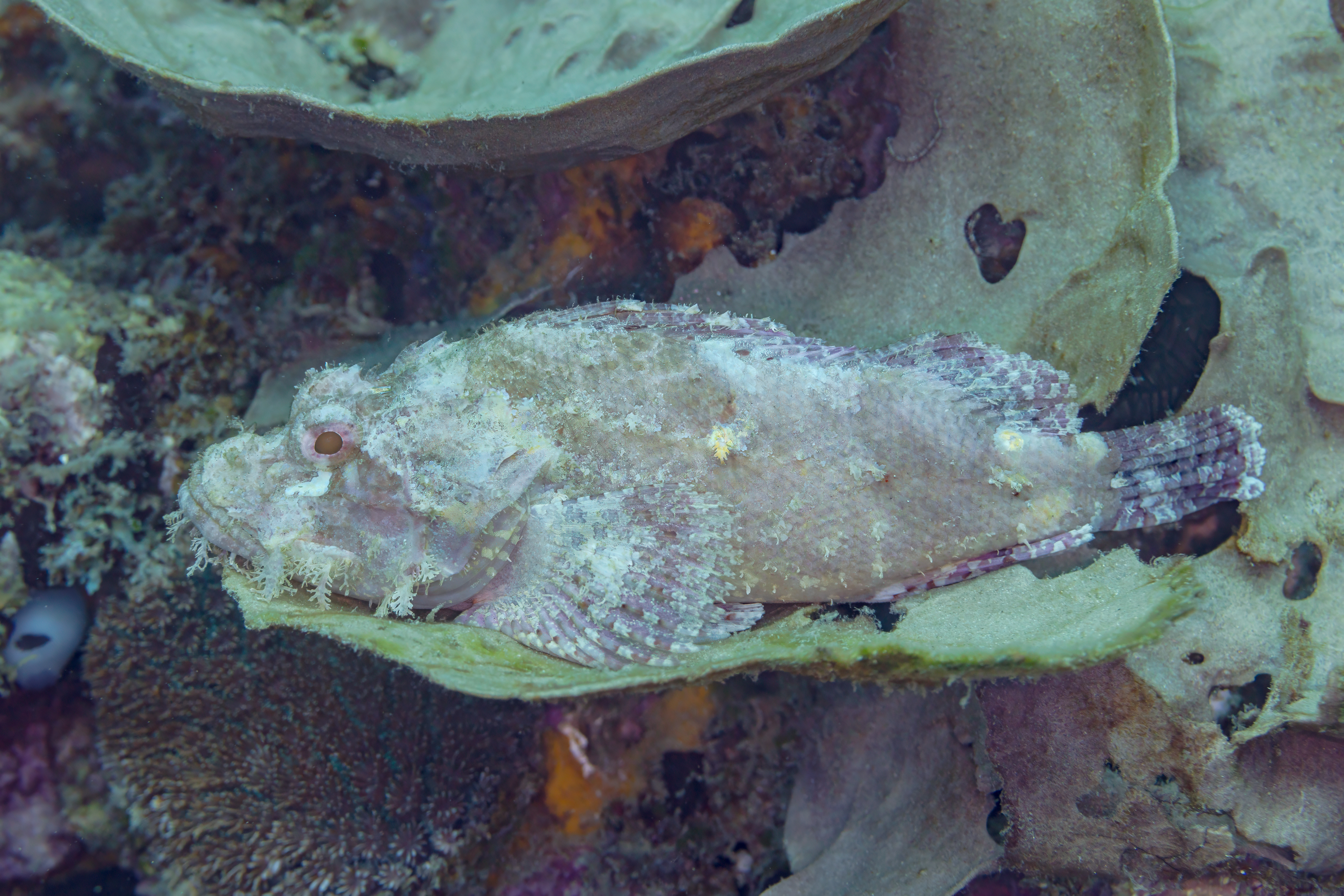

Conservation status
- Least Concern (IUCN 3.1)

Scientific classification
- Kingdom: Animalia
- Phylum: Chordata
- Class: Actinopterygii
- Order: Perciformes
- Family: Scorpaenidae
- Genus: Scorpaenopsis
- Species: S. oxycephalus

Binomial name
- Scorpaenopsis oxycephalus (Bleeker, 1849)

Synonyms
- Scorpaena oxycephalus Bleeker, 1849; Scorpaenopsis oxycephala (Bleeker, 1849)

= Scorpaenopsis oxycephalus =

Species of fish

Scorpaenopsis oxycephalus, the tasseled scorpionfish, or small-scaled scorpionfish, is a species of venomous marine ray-finned fish belonging to the family Scorpaenidae, the scorpionfishes. It has a wide distribution in the Indian and Pacific Oceans. It is the largest species in its genus.

== Taxonomy ==
Scorpaenopsis oxycephalus was first formally described as Scorpaena oxycephalus in 1849 by the Dutch physician, herpetologist and ichthyologist Pieter Bleeker with the type locality given as Jakarta on Java. The specific name is a compound of oxy which means "sharp" and cephalus meaning "head", an allusion to the long snout of this fish.

== Description ==
Scorpaenopsis oxycephalus has an elongate body which becomes compressed towards the rear with a narrow intraorbital space. The upper posttemporal and upper opercular spines are simple. The occipital pit is either absent or very shallow. It has a very long snout and in adults there are numerous tentacles which form a beard around the mouth. There are 12 spines and 9 soft rays in the dorsal fin and 3 spines and 5 soft rays in the anal fin. The supraocular and postocular spines are widely merged in adults so that only the tip of the supraocular spine shows, and these flare outwards to create a ridge over the rear half of the eye. This species attains a maximum published total length of 36 cm (14 in), the largest species in the genus Scorpaenopsis. This scorpionfish has mottled and variable patterning of reddish-brown marked with white patches, and frequently with a darker triangular area underneath the eye that extends back over the cheek.

== Distribution and habitat ==
Scorpaenopsis oxycephalus has a wide Indo-Pacific distribution which extends from the Red Sea south to Sodwana Bay in South Africa and through the Indian Ocean and Persian Gulf east to New Guinea, south to Australia and north to Taiwan and, probably, the Ryukyu Islands of southern Japan. In Australian waters this species is found on the Northwest Shelf off Western Australia, at Cartier Island in the Timor Sea and on the Great Barrier Reef off Queensland, as well as at Christmas Island. It has been reported from False Bay in South Africa. They inhabit reef slopes from only 1 to 35 meters.

== Biology ==
Scorpaenopsis oxycephalus is a solitary species. It is a nocturnal ambush predator feeding on fishes and crustaceans. When in shallow waters, swimmers may accidentally tread on them which may cause painful injury from the venomous spines. This species has unique vibrant orange colours and markings that allow it to camouflage itself well in between the rocky reefs.

== Utilisation ==
Scorpaenopsis oxycephalus is sometimes caught by spear fishers and as bycatch in trawls. It occasionally makes its way into the aquarium trade.

== Gallery ==
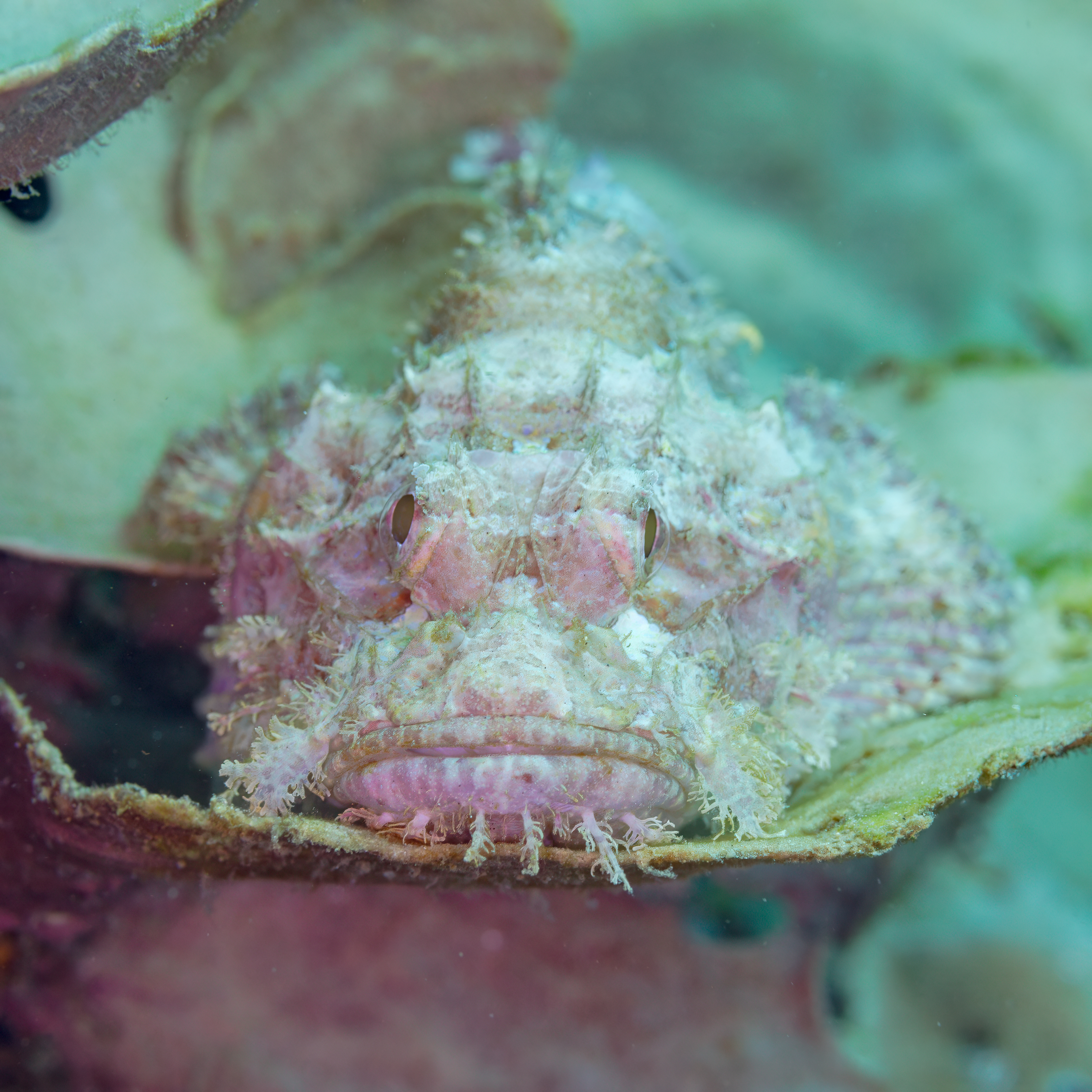
Front view of S. oxycephala

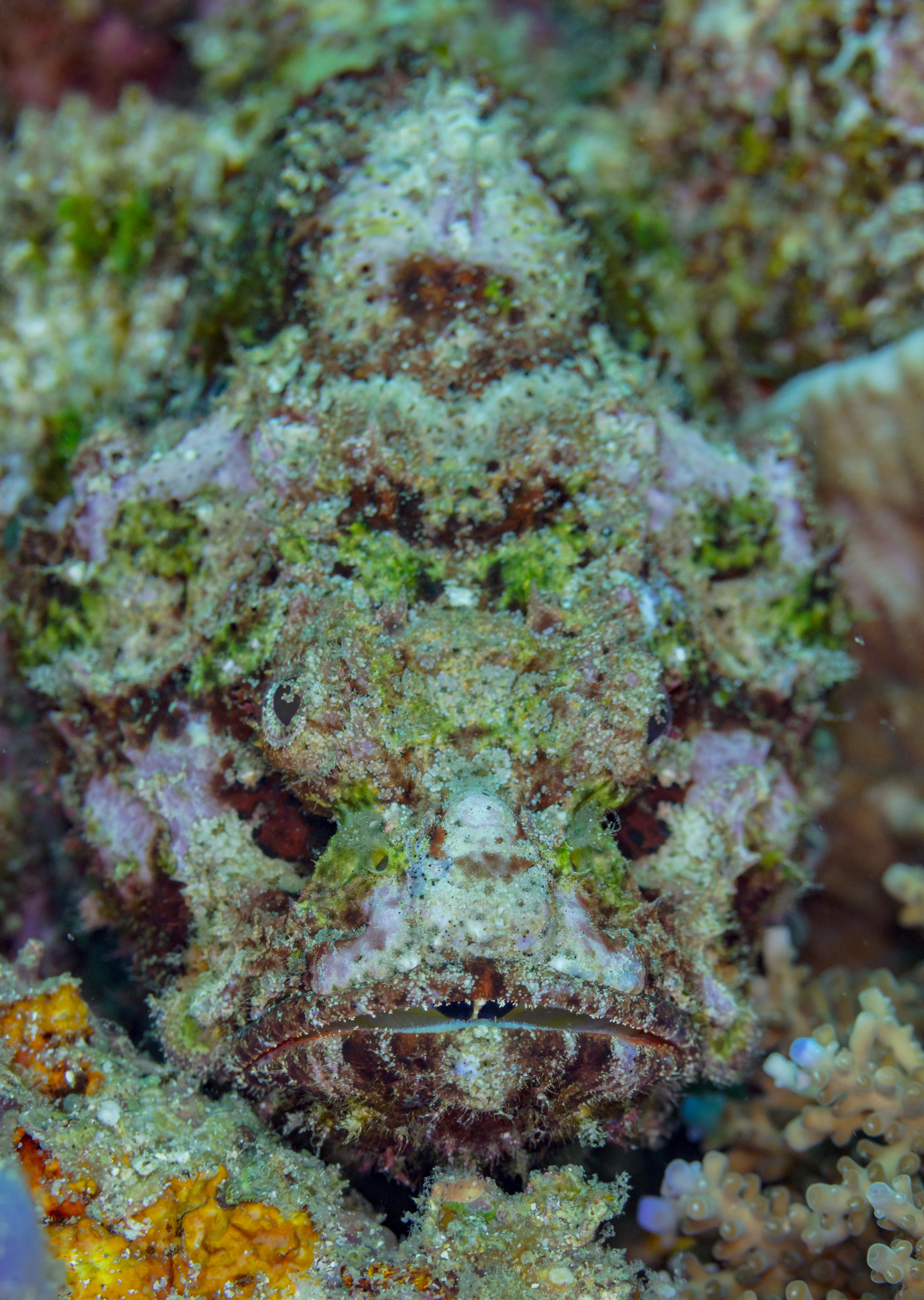
Exemplar in Anilao, Philippines

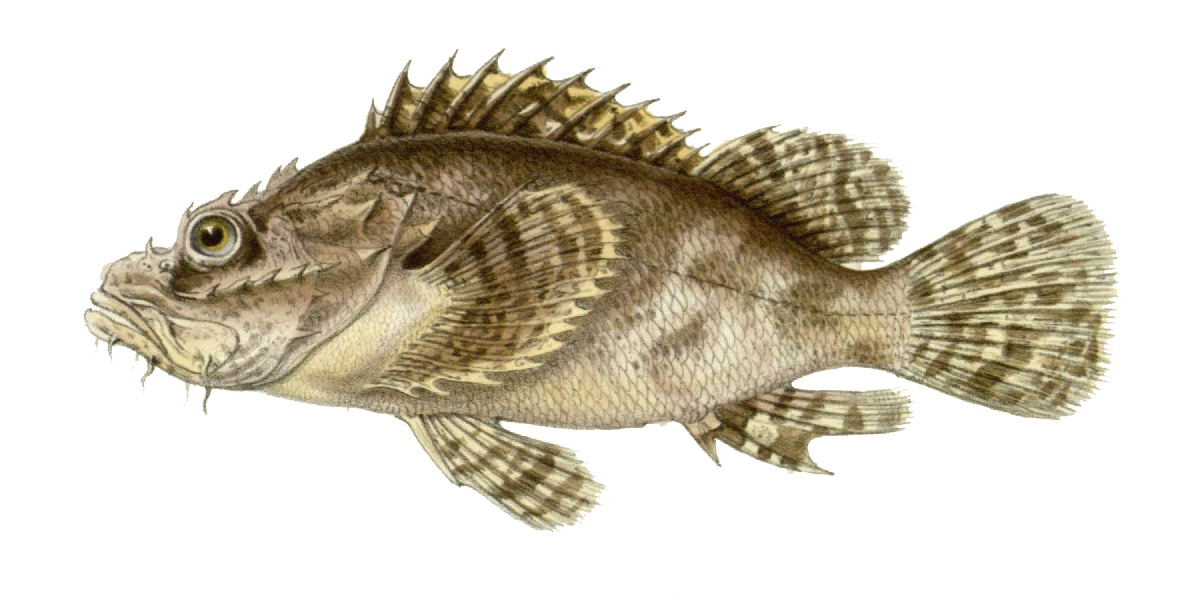
Illustration

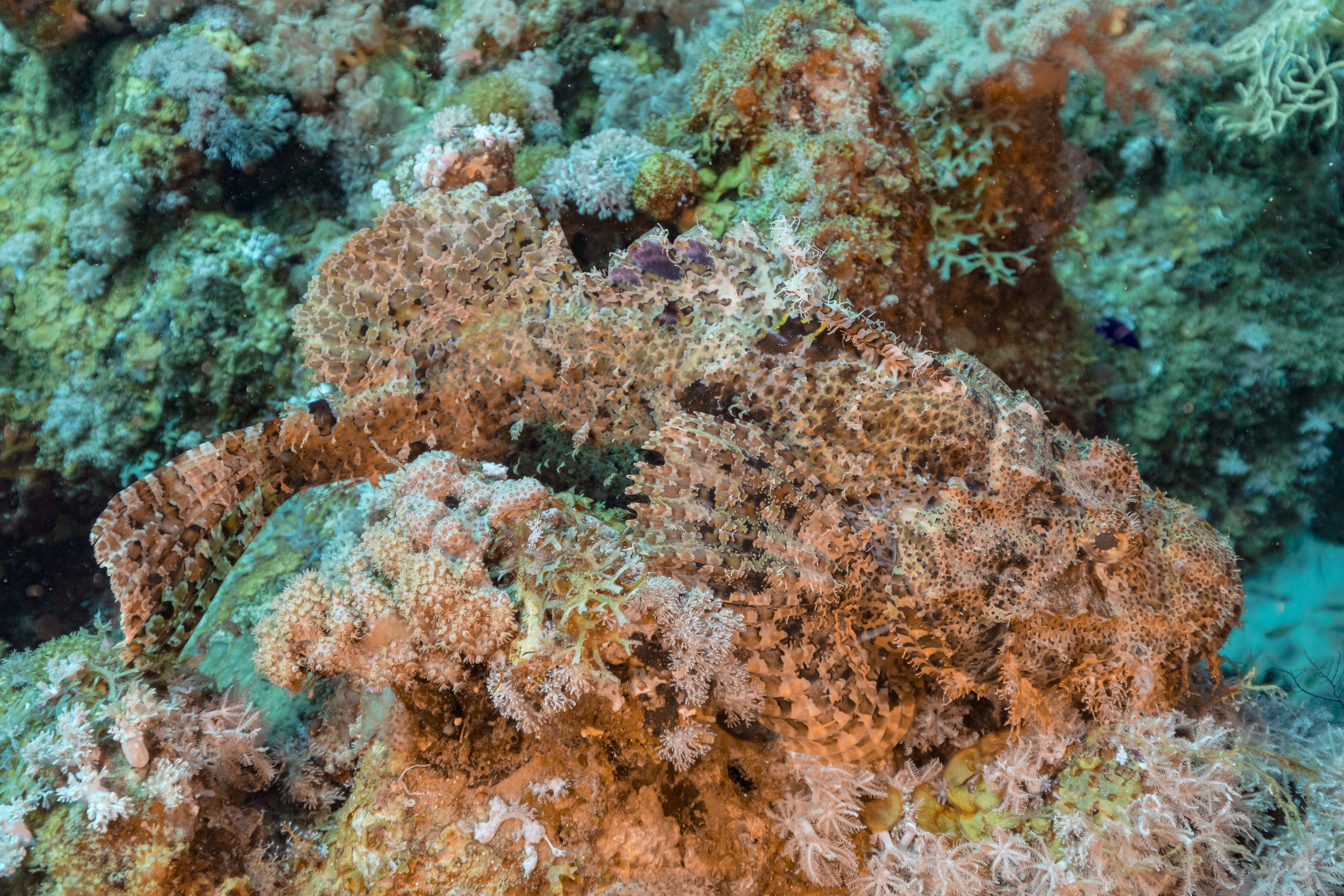
