= Scorpaenopsis insperatus =

Scientific classification
- Kingdom: Animalia
- Phylum: Chordata
- Class: Actinopterygii
- Order: Perciformes
- Family: Scorpaenidae
- Genus: Scorpaenopsis
- Species: S. insperatus

Binomial name
- Scorpaenopsis insperatus Motomura, 2004

Species of fish

Scorpaenopsis insperatus, the Sydney scorpionfish, is a species of venomous marine ray-finned fish belonging to the family Scorpaenidae, the scorpionfishes. This species is found in the south-western Pacific Ocean.

== Description ==
This species reaches a length of 4.9 cm (1.9 in).
