= HMS Siren (1773) =

Enterprise-class Royal Navy frigate

- Siren, a 28-gun, sixth-rate frigate, as built by Henri at Chatham

History

Great Britain
- Name: HMS Siren
- Ordered: 25 December 1770
- Builder: John Henniker & Co, Chatham
- Laid down: April 1771
- Launched: 2 November 1773
- Completed: 5 October 1775 at Chatham Dockyard
- Commissioned: August 1775
- Fate: Grounded and abandoned under fire, 6 November 1777

General characteristics
- Class & type: 28-gun Enterprise-class sixth-rate frigate
- Tons burthen: 603 40/94 bm
- Length: 120 ft 10 in (36.83 m) (overall); 99 ft 7.5 in (30.366 m) (keel)
- Beam: 33 ft 9 in (10.3 m)
- Depth of hold: 10 ft 9 in (3.28 m)
- Sail plan: Full-rigged ship
- Complement: 200 officers and men
- Armament: 28 guns comprising; Upper deck: 24 × 9-pounder guns; Quarterdeck: 4 × 6-pounder guns; Forecastle: nil; 12 × swivel guns

HMS Siren (or Syren (Note: Spelling during the period was not fixed.)) was a 28-gun Enterprise-class sixth-rate frigate of the Royal Navy. Siren was first commissioned in August 1775 under the command of Captain Tobias Furneaux, her only commanding officer.

== Service ==
She took part in the Battle of the Rice Boats on 2–3 March 1776 on the border between the Province of Georgia and the Province of South Carolina and in the Battle of Sullivan's Island of 28 June 1776 upon Charleston, South Carolina. On 5 June 1777 she captured Jammy off Cape Sambro. Sometime in September 1777 she captured Batchelor off Block Island and sometime in the 1st week of November she captured Success also off Block Island.

== Fate ==
Siren, escorting a convoy in poor visibility, ran aground at about 6:00 am on 6 November 1777 near Point Judith, along with two other ships. Efforts were made to bring her off, but American forces ashore brought up field artillery and prevented salvage operations. Siren was abandoned with the loss of 2 killed and 5 wounded. (Note: Some sources have 10 November, but the court martial records and other official documents show 6 November.)

== Post script ==
The sloop Mary Ann, which had a diving machine, arrived at Newport, Rhode Island on 24 July 1815. She had retrieved Syren's best bower anchor and a quantity of iron knees.

== Bibliography ==
- Robert Gardiner, The First Frigates, Conway Maritime Press, London 1992. ISBN 0-85177-601-9.
- David Lyon, The Sailing Navy List, Conway Maritime Press, London 1993. ISBN 0-85177-617-5.
- Rif Winfield, British Warships in the Age of Sail, 1714 to 1792, Seaforth Publishing, London 2007. ISBN 978-1-84415-700-6.
