= Scorpaenopsis lactomaculata =

Conservation status
- Least Concern (IUCN 3.1)

Scientific classification
- Kingdom: Animalia
- Phylum: Chordata
- Class: Actinopterygii
- Order: Perciformes
- Family: Scorpaenidae
- Genus: Scorpaenopsis
- Species: S. lactomaculata

Binomial name
- Scorpaenopsis lactomaculata (Herre, 1945)

Synonyms
- Scorpaena lactomaculata Herre, 1945

Species of fish

Scorpaenopsis lactomaculata, the whiteblotched scorpionfish, is a species of venomous marine ray-finned fish belonging to the family Scorpaenidae, the scorpionfishes. It is found in the western Indian Ocean.

== Description ==
This species reaches a length of 28.0 cm (11.0 in).
