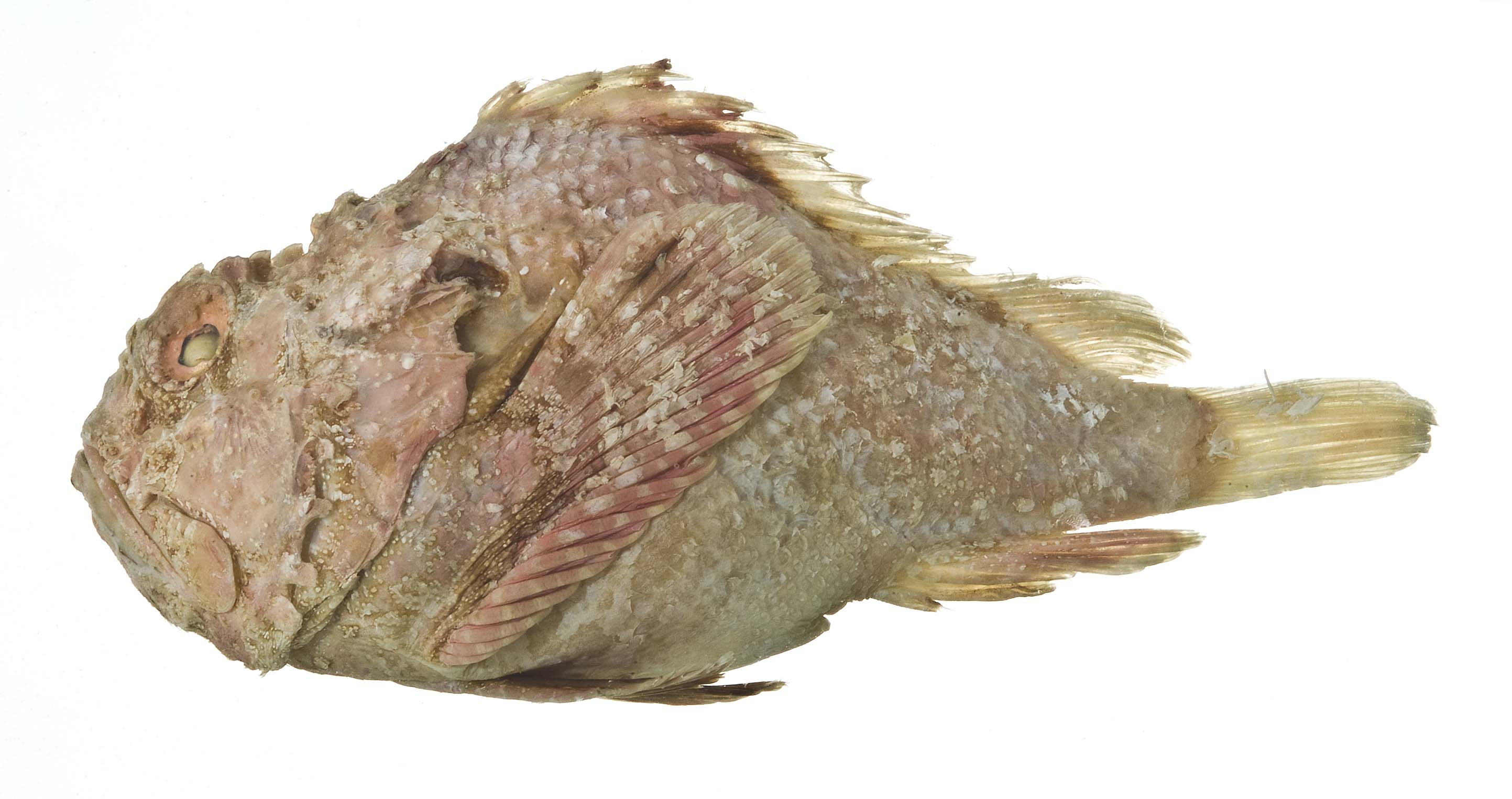

Scientific classification
- Kingdom: Animalia
- Phylum: Chordata
- Class: Actinopterygii
- Order: Perciformes
- Family: Scorpaenidae
- Genus: Scorpaenopsis
- Species: S. obtusa

Binomial name
- Scorpaenopsis obtusa J. E. Randall & Eschmeyer, 2002

= Scorpaenopsis obtusa =

Species of fish

Scorpaenopsis obtusa, the shortsnout scorpionfish, is a species of venomous marine ray-finned fish belonging to the family Scorpaenidae, the scorpionfishes. This species is found in the Indo-West Pacific Ocean all the way from Western Australia to Papua New Guinea and then north to Japan.

== Description ==
This species reaches a length of 10.0 cm (3.9 in).
