= Scorpaenopsis crenulata =

Serrated deepwater scorpionfish

Conservation status
- Data Deficient (IUCN 3.1)

Scientific classification
- Kingdom: Animalia
- Phylum: Chordata
- Class: Actinopterygii
- Division: Teleostei
- Order: Perciformes
- Family: Scorpaenidae
- Genus: Scorpaenopsis
- Species: S. crenulata

Binomial name
- Scorpaenopsis crenulata Motomura & Causse, 2011

Species of fish

Scorpaenopsis crenulata, the serrated deepwater scorpionfish, is a species of venomous marine ray-finned fish belonging to the family Scorpaenidae, the scorpionfishes. Adults reach a length of 4.9 cm (1.9 in). This species is found in the southwestern Pacific Ocean around the French territory of Wallis and Futuna. It has been recorded at a depth of 600 m (2,000 ft) and inhabits unusually deep habitats for its genus.

== Taxonomy ==
The name of the genus is derived from the genus Scorpaena and opsis, meaning "appearance", referring to the resemblance of Scorpaenopsis to those of Scorpaena. The specific epithet means "serrated" in Latin, after the serrations on the dorsal spines on the head.

== Description ==
The serrated deepwater scorpionfish reaches a length of 4.9 cm (1.9 in). Like other members of its genus, it has a laterally flattened head, twelve spines on the dorsal fins, no palatine teeth, and black coloration in between the first and third spines on the dorsal fin.

== Distribution and conservation ==
The serrated deepwater scorpionfish is very poorly known, having only been documented from one specimen collected off the coast of Wallis and Futuna, a French overseas collectivity located in the southwestern Pacific Ocean. Consequently, it is listed as being data deficient on the IUCN Red List. This species is benthic like all others in its genus; however, it seems to inhabit considerably deeper waters than the rest of its congeners, having been recorded at a depth of 600 m (2,000 ft). Other Scorpaenopsis scorpionfish are typically found above 50 m (160 ft), and rarely below 100 m (330 ft).
