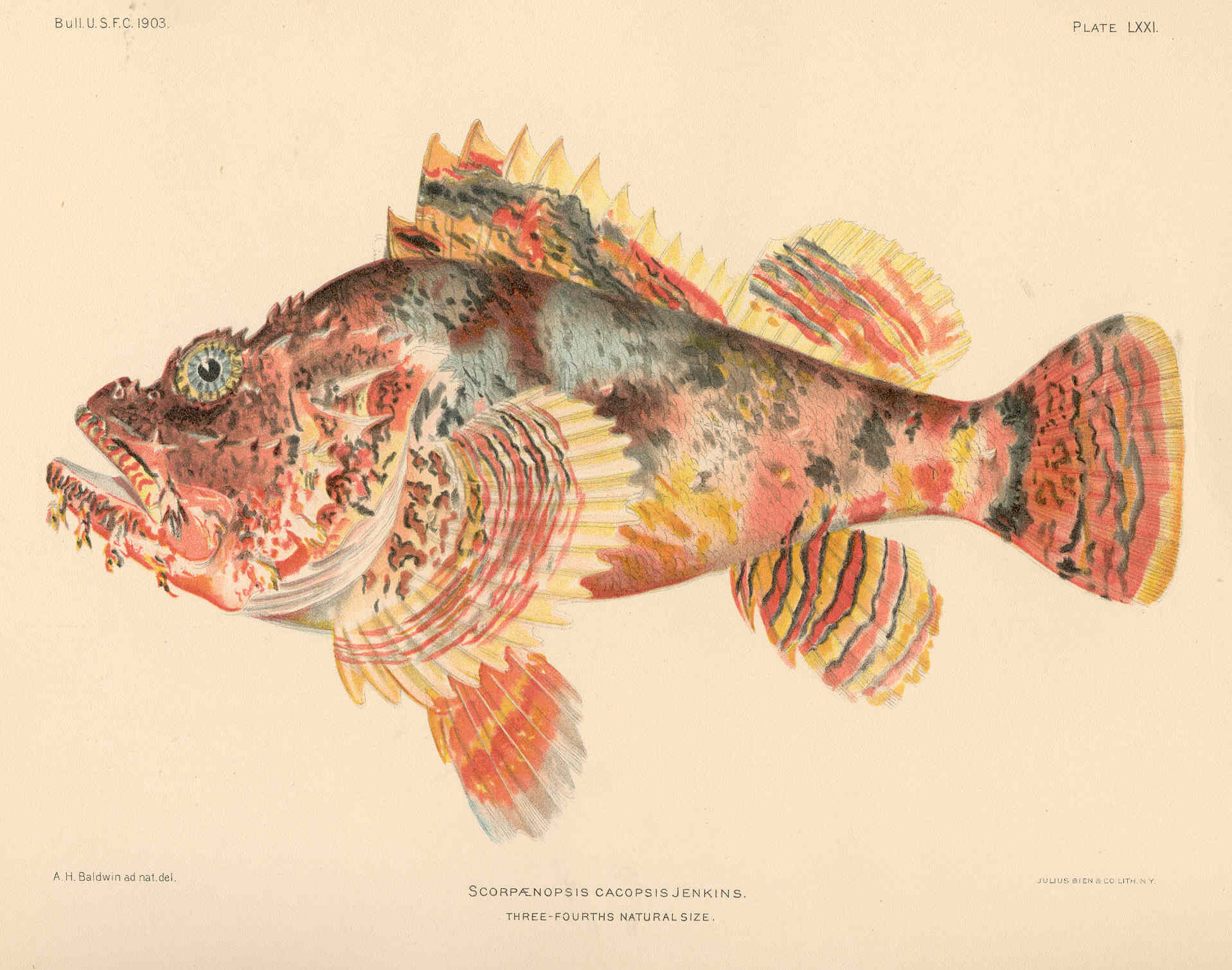

Conservation status
- Data Deficient (IUCN 3.1)

Scientific classification
- Kingdom: Animalia
- Phylum: Chordata
- Class: Actinopterygii
- Order: Perciformes
- Family: Scorpaenidae
- Genus: Scorpaenopsis
- Species: S. cacopsis

Binomial name
- Scorpaenopsis cacopsis O. P. Jenkins, 1901

= Scorpaenopsis cacopsis =

Jenkin's scorpionfish

Species of fish

Scorpaenopsis cacopsis, also known as Jenkin's scorpionfish, is a species of venomous marine ray-finned fish belonging to the family Scorpaenidae, the scorpionfishes. This species is found off Hawaii.

== Description and biology ==
Scorpaenopsis cacopsis, is a visually striking species recognized for its elaborate, fringed appearance, which also aids in camouflage. Characterized by a flattened body and mottled brown to reddish coloration, its robust look blends effectively with rocky and coral reefs. This species reaches a length of 51.0 cm (20.1 in).

As ambush predators, they remain motionless on the ocean floor until unsuspecting prey comes too close, allowing them to suck in their catch with their large mouths. Injuries from scorpionfish can be avoided by not standing on or touching the reef. If stung, treating the injury quickly is important by soaking the affected area in hot water. Scorpionfish are generally solitary in the wild and only come together for breeding. Breeding them in captivity is uncommon and not well-documented.

== Distribution and habitat ==
Scorpionfish inhabit the Indo-Pacific region, from the Red Sea and East Africa to Samoa and southern Japan. They commonly reside in ledges and caves in Hawaiʻi along outer coral reefs, often resting motionless on the sea floor or in crevices, at depths of 10 to 200 feet. They mainly hunt at night, preying on small fish and crustaceans. As carnivores, they need a protein-rich diet, primarily consuming marine fish, crustaceans, clams, and other meaty foods.

== Cultural significance ==
The Hawaiian name "nohu" also refers to the land plant Tribulus terrestris, or puncture vine, whose sharp seeds can puncture feet, reminiscent of the scorpionfish's venomous spines that deliver a painful sting. The scorpionfish fish is a prized food item with its population reducing rapidly in the Hawaiian islands, due to spear fishermen overfishing.
