= Scorpaenopsis gilchristi =

Conservation status
- Data Deficient (IUCN 3.1)

Scientific classification
- Kingdom: Animalia
- Phylum: Chordata
- Class: Actinopterygii
- Order: Perciformes
- Family: Scorpaenidae
- Genus: Scorpaenopsis
- Species: S. gilchristi

Binomial name
- Scorpaenopsis gilchristi (J. L. B. Smith, 1957)

Synonyms
- Dendroscorpaena gilchristi J. L. B. Smith, 1957

Species of fish

Scorpaenopsis gilchristi, Gilchrist's scorpionfish, is a species of venomous marine ray-finned fish belonging to the family Scorpaenidae, the scorpionfishes. It is found in the western Indian Ocean.

== Etymology ==
The fish is named in honor of John Dow Fisher Gilchrist (1866-1926), as the describer considered him the "father of South African ichthyology and the pioneer investigator of the rich resources of our seas"

== Description ==
This species reaches a length of 6.0 cm (2.4 in).
