= Tobias Furneaux =

18th-century English navigator and explorer

Captain Tobias Furneaux
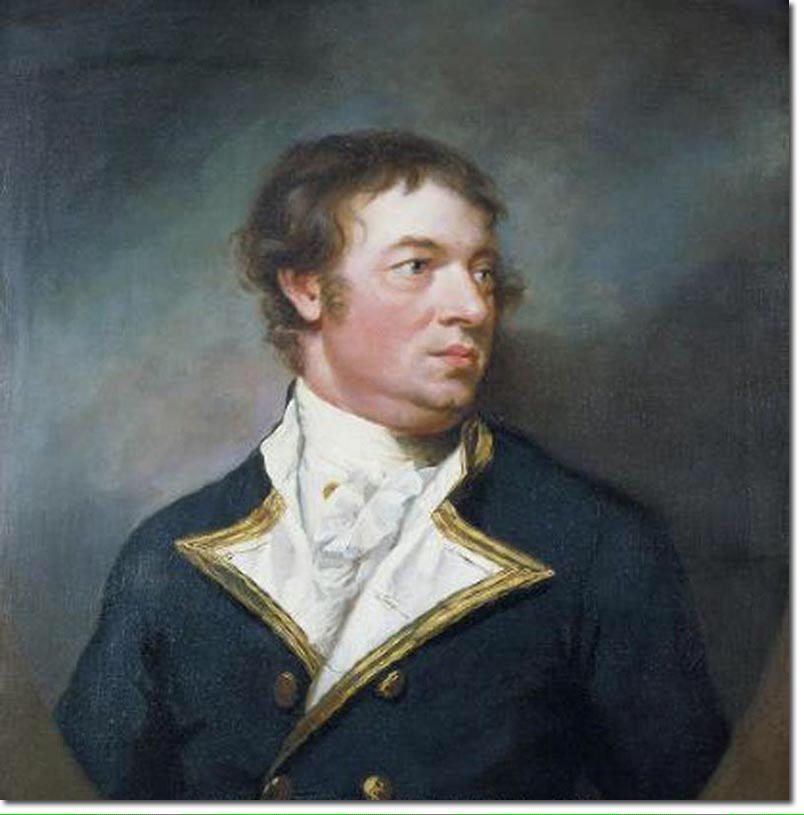
- Tobias Furneaux by James Northcote
- Born: 21 August 1735; Plymouth
- Died: 18 September 1781 (aged 46)
- Burial place: Plymouth
- Military career
- Allegiance: Great Britain
- Branch: Royal Navy
- Rank: Captain
- Commands: Adventure; Siren
- Conflicts: Seven Years' War; American War of Independence

Captain Tobias Furneaux (21 August 1735 – 18 September 1781) was a British navigator and Royal Navy officer, who accompanied James Cook on his second voyage of exploration. He was one of the first men to circumnavigate the world in both directions, and later commanded a British vessel during the American War of Independence.

== Early life ==
Furneaux was born at Swilly House near Stoke Damerel, Plymouth Dock, son of William Furneaux (1696–1748) of Swilly, and Susanna Wilcocks (1698–1775). He entered the Royal Navy and was employed on the French and African coasts and in the West Indies during the latter part of the Seven Years' War (1760–1763). He served as second lieutenant of HMS Dolphin under Captain Samuel Wallis on the latter's voyage round the globe (August 1766 – May 1768) and due to Wallis being ill and confined to his cabin, Furneaux was the first European to set foot on Tahiti, hoisting a pennant, turning a turf, and taking possession of the land in the name of His Majesty (25 June 1767).

== Service with Cook ==
In November 1771, Furneaux was given command of HMS Adventure, which accompanied James Cook (in Resolution) on his second voyage. On this expedition Furneaux was twice separated from his leader (8 February 1773 to 19 May 1773; and 22 October 1773 to 14 July 1774, the date of his return to England). On the former occasion he explored a great part of the south and east coasts of Van Diemen's Land (now Tasmania), and made the earliest British chart of the island. Unfortunately he mapped several place names incorrectly. He glimpsed the opening to D'Entrecasteaux Channel and thought that was Storm Bay. He thought he had rounded Cape Pillar and was on the east coast just south of Cape Frederick Hendrik, whereas he had turned left one stop early and was at Bruny Island, where he named Adventure Bay for his ship. The cape to his north he assumed to be Cape Frederick Hendrik, with Frederick Hendrik Bay on the other side of it, so he put both names on his chart. Off to the north-east, Furneaux could see where Maria Island should be, but there seemed to be a few extra sights of land, so he changed the name to Maria Isles.

Most of his names here survive; Cook, visiting the shore-line on his third voyage, confirmed Furneaux's account and delineation of it, with certain minor criticisms and emendations, and named after him the Furneaux Group at the eastern entrance to Bass Strait, and the group now known as the Low Archipelago.

== The Grass Cove incident ==
After Adventure was separated from Resolution in late October 1773, Furneaux took his ship to a prearranged rendezvous point at Ship Cove on the northern end of the South Island of New Zealand, a place where both ships had been before. Arriving on November 30, they found a message in a bottle stating that Cook had been there and they had missed him by only a few days. Furneaux decided to shelter there to replenish their water and food supplies and because the local Māori had previously been friendly. On December 17, planning to set sail the next day, Furneaux sent a cutter with 10 men to collect fresh grasses at a nearby beach which they called Grass Cove. The men never returned. The next day another cutter was sent to search for them and found some clothes and the human remains of their crewmen - hearts, lungs, livers, and severed body parts including a human hand with a tattoo known to belong to one of the sailors on the previous day's cutter, and the severed head of Furneaux's servant James Swilley. Some of the remains had been cooked or were still roasting over coals. They later came upon several hundred Maoris nearby gathering for what looked like a celebration, who tried to invite them in. Fearing they would also be butchered, they put out to sea and returned to the Adventure with some of the evidence. Members of the crew urged Furneaux to return and fire their cannon on the Maoris, but Furneaux decided it was pointless and they sailed off the next day. The reason for the killings was never discovered.

Furneaux and the Adventure never reconnected with Cook and eventually returned home to Portsmouth in July 1774. The lurid story of cannibalism in New Zealand caused a sensation in the British press. Furneaux also brought back with him Omai of Ulaietea (Raiatea), a South Sea Islander. Omai was the first Pacific Islander to travel to Great Britain and later returned to Tahiti with Cook on 12 August 1777. Also of note is that Furneaux successfully introduced domestic animals and potatoes into the South Sea Islands.

== Later commands ==
Furneaux was made a captain in 1775. During the American War of Independence, he commanded HMS Syren in the British attack of 28 June 1776 upon Charleston, South Carolina. Syren, with Furneaux in command, was wrecked near Point Judith, Rhode Island on 6 November 1777. (Note: Some sources have 10 November, but the court martial records and other official documents show 6 November.) The Rhode Island Marine Archaeology Project (RIMAP) has published a detailed history of the Syren's activities in the American War of Independence, as well as some of the original documents related to her loss, confirming 6 November as the correct date. By 10 November Furneaux and his crew were prisoners in Providence, Rhode Island, awaiting later exchange. RIMAP has also noted that the Syren is one of at least five ships associated with Captain Cook and his circumnavigating men with an historical connection to the State of Rhode Island.

== Taxon named in his honor ==
- The Furneaux scorpionfish, Scorpaenopsis furneauxi is a species of venomous marine ray-finned fish belonging to the family Scorpaenidae, the scorpionfishes that was named after him.

Furneaux died unmarried in 1781 and was buried in Stoke Damerel Church in Plymouth where he had been christened.

== See also ==
- European and American voyages of scientific exploration

== Notes ==
=== References ===
- Hough, Richard (1995). Captain James Cook. Hodder and Stoughton. ISBN 9780340825563.
- Marx, Robert F. (1987). Shipwrecks in the Americas. Courier Dover Publications. ISBN 978-0-486-25514-9.
- Sides, Hampton (2024). The Wide Wide Sea: Imperial Ambition, First Contact, and the Fateful Final Voyage of Captain James Cook. Doubleday. ISBN 9780385544764.
- Winfield, Rif (2007). British Warships in the Age of Sail, 1714 to 1792. Seaforth Publishing. ISBN 9781844157006.
