= Bostrychus microphthalmus =

Scientific classification
- Kingdom: Animalia
- Phylum: Chordata
- Class: Actinopterygii
- Division: Teleostei
- Order: Gobiiformes
- Family: Butidae
- Genus: Bostrychus
- Species: B. microphthalmus

Binomial name
- Bostrychus microphthalmus Hoese & Kottelat, 2005

Species of fish

Bostrychus microphthalmus is a species of fish from the family Butidae. It is endemic to Maros karst in southern Sulawesi, Indonesia. It was the first documented cave-dwelling fish in Sulawesi, but since then the brotula Diancistrus typhlops has been described from nearby Muna Island, and an additional apparently undescribed eleotrid is known from Sulawesi's Maros karst.

The specific name of B. microphthalmus refers to the small eyes of this fish.

== Description ==
Bostrychus microphthalmus grow to 7.5 cm (3.0 in) SL. The head is flat on top and the trunk region is elongate. It differs from other Bostrychus species by having reduced eyes covered with skin and reduced head canal development, body pigment, and head squamation.

== Habitat ==
The species is a cave dweller that is usually found in backwaters, lying on clay bottom.
