= Eschmeyer's Catalog of Fishes =

Reference work on the scientific names of fish species and genera

Catalog of Fishes is a comprehensive on-line database and reference work on the scientific names of fish species and genera. It is global in its scope and is hosted by the California Academy of Sciences. It has been compiled and is continuously updated by the curator emeritus of the CAS fish collection, William N. Eschmeyer.

The taxonomy maintained by the Catalog of Fishes is considered authoritative and it is used as a baseline reference for instance by the broader global fish database FishBase, which involves cross-references to the catalog's information for all accepted taxa. As of 2015, the searchable catalogue contains entries for about 58,300 fish species names, about 33,400 of which are currently accepted (valid), and for some 10,600 genera (5,100 valid). The information given for any species name generally contains the reference to the original description, to the type specimen, references to the usage of the name in taxonomic literature, a statement of the current status of the name and valid name of the taxon, and the family it belongs to.

A printed 3000-page three-volume and CD version of the catalog was published in 1998. That was preceded by a Catalog of the genera of recent fishes in 1990.

The catalog was renamed Eschmeyer's Catalog of Fishes in 2019, and is now edited by Ronald Fricke, Richard van der Laan and William N. Eschmeyer. It is available online and updated monthly.

== See also ==
- FishBase
- WoRMS
- Fishes of the World
- International Code of Zoological Nomenclature

== Original resource ==
- Eschmeyer, W.N. Catalog of Fishes Online Database
- Eschmeyer, W.N. (ed.) 1998. Catalog of fishes. Special Publication, California Academy of Sciences, San Francisco. 3 vols. 2905 p.
- Eschmeyer, W.N. 1990. Catalog of the genera of recent fishes. California Academy of Sciences, San Francisco. 697 p.
