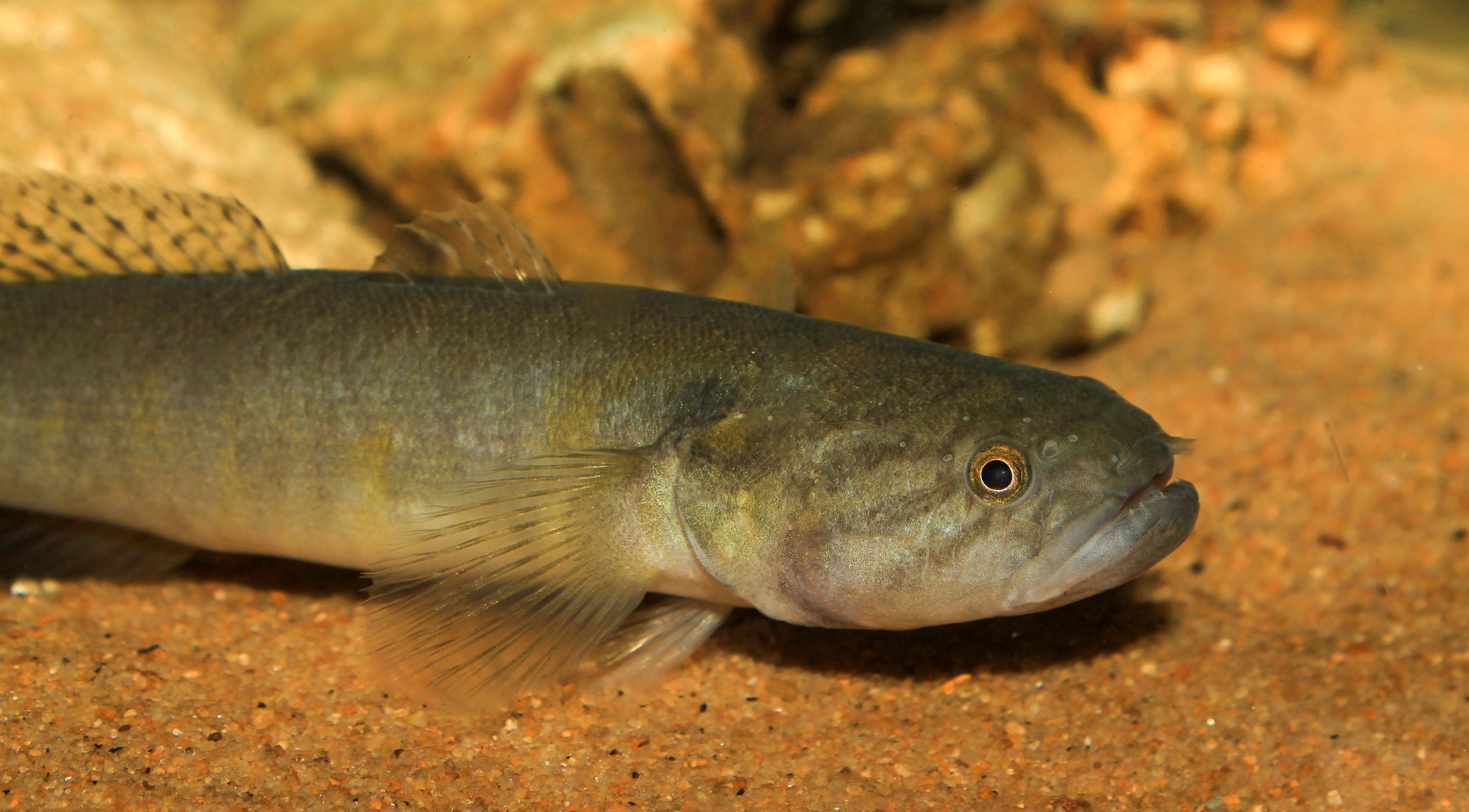
- Four-eyed Sleeper (B. sinensis)

Scientific classification
- Kingdom: Animalia
- Phylum: Chordata
- Class: Actinopterygii
- Division: Teleostei
- Order: Gobiiformes
- Family: Butidae
- Genus: Bostrychus; Lacépède, 1801

Type species
- Bostrychus sinensis Lacépède, 1801

Synonyms
- Boroda Herre, 1927; Bostrichthys A. M. C. Duméril, 1806; Bostrictis Rafinesque, 1815; Hanno Herre, 1946; Hannoichthys Herre, 1950; Ictiopogon Rafinesque, 1815; Psilus G. Fischer, 1813

= Bostrychus =

Genus of fishes

Bostrychus is a genus of fishes in the family Butidae mostly native to eastern Asia to Australia with one species being found along the Atlantic coast of Africa. While some of these species are restricted to freshwater, most can be found in marine, fresh and brackish waters.

== Species ==
There are currently nine recognized species in this genus:

- Bostrychus africanus (Steindachner, 1879)
- Bostrychus aruensis M. C. W. Weber, 1911 (Island gudgeon)
- Bostrychus donghaiensis Zhang, Yang, Luo & Ding, 2024 (Donghai gudgeon)
- Bostrychus expatria (Herre, 1927)
- Bostrychus microphthalmus Hoese & Kottelat, 2005
- Bostrychus scalaris Larson, 2008 (Ladder gudgeon)
- Bostrychus sinensis Lacépède, 1801 (Four-eyed sleeper)
- Bostrychus strigogenys Nichols, 1937 (Striped-cheek gudgeon)
- Bostrychus zonatus M. C. W. Weber, 1907 (Barred gudgeon)
