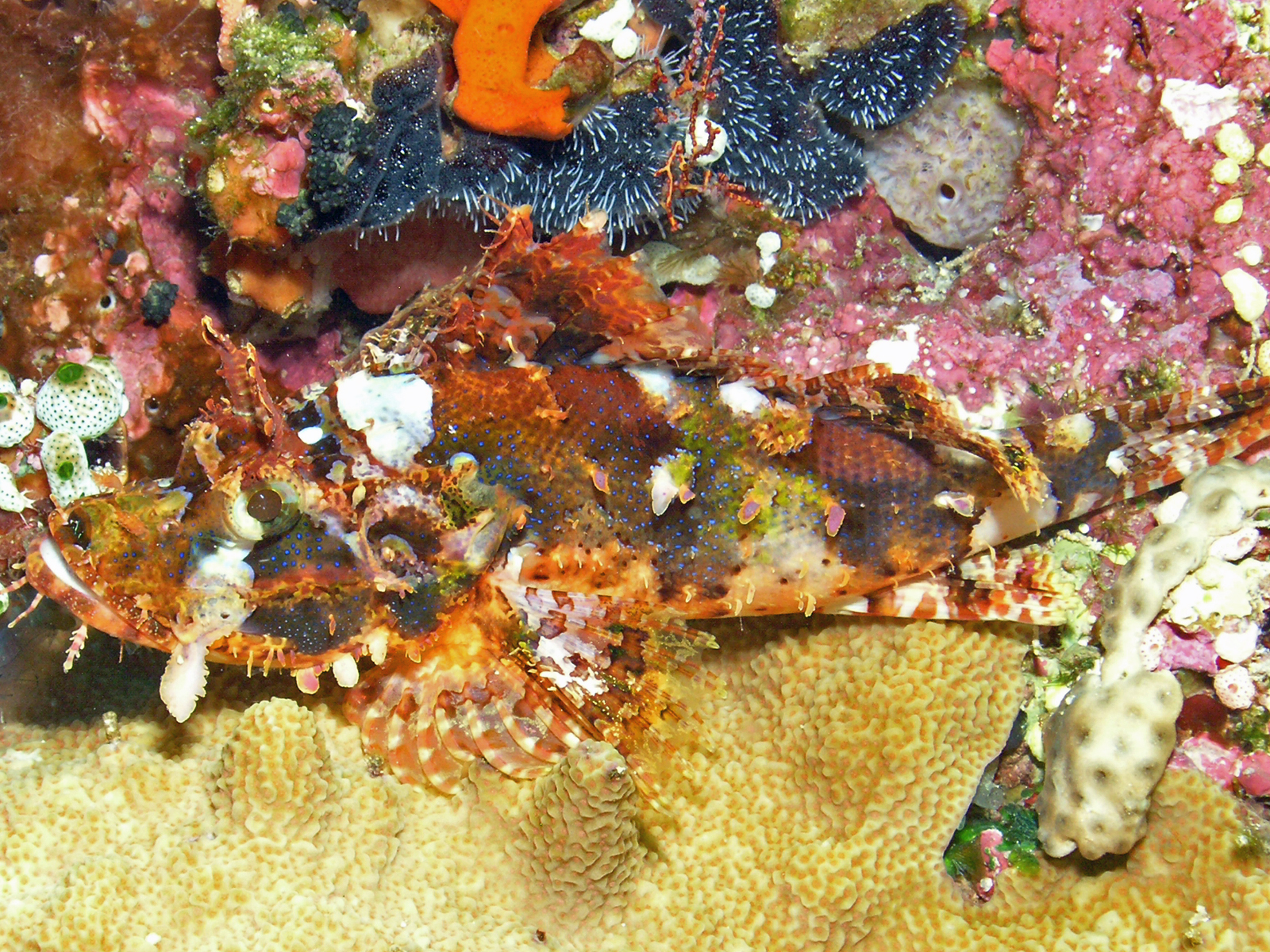

Conservation status
- Least Concern (IUCN 3.1)

Scientific classification
- Kingdom: Animalia
- Phylum: Chordata
- Class: Actinopterygii
- Order: Perciformes
- Family: Scorpaenidae
- Genus: Scorpaenopsis
- Species: S. venosa

Binomial name
- Scorpaenopsis venosa (G. Cuvier, 1829)

Synonyms
- Scorpaena venosa Cuvier, 1829

= Scorpaenopsis venosa =

Raggy scorpionfish

Species of fish

Scorpaenopsis venosa, the raggy scorpionfish, is a species of venomous marine ray-finned fish belonging to the family Scorpaenidae, the scorpionfishes. This species is found in the Indo-West Pacific Ocean.

== Description ==
This species reaches a length of 25.0 cm (9.8 in).
