= Syleter =

Syleter papua

Scientific classification
- Kingdom: Animalia
- Phylum: Arthropoda
- Class: Insecta
- Order: Coleoptera
- Suborder: Adephaga
- Family: Carabidae
- Subfamily: Scaritinae
- Genus: Syleter; Andrewes, 1941

Synonyms
- Psilus Putzeys, 1877

Genus of beetles

Syleter is a genus of beetles in the family Carabidae. It contains the following species:

== Species ==
- Syleter andrewesi (Basilewsky, 1931)
- Syleter doriae (Putzeys, 1873)
- Syleter fulvaster (Andrewes, 1927)
- Syleter gradus Balkenohl, 2021
- Syleter malayicus (Andrewes, 1927)
- Syleter papua Darlington, 1962
- Syleter paradoxus (Putzeys, 1868)
- Syleter porphyreus (Andrewes, 1923)
- Syleter sinepunctatus Balkenohl, 2021
- Syleter validus (Andrewes, 1936)
