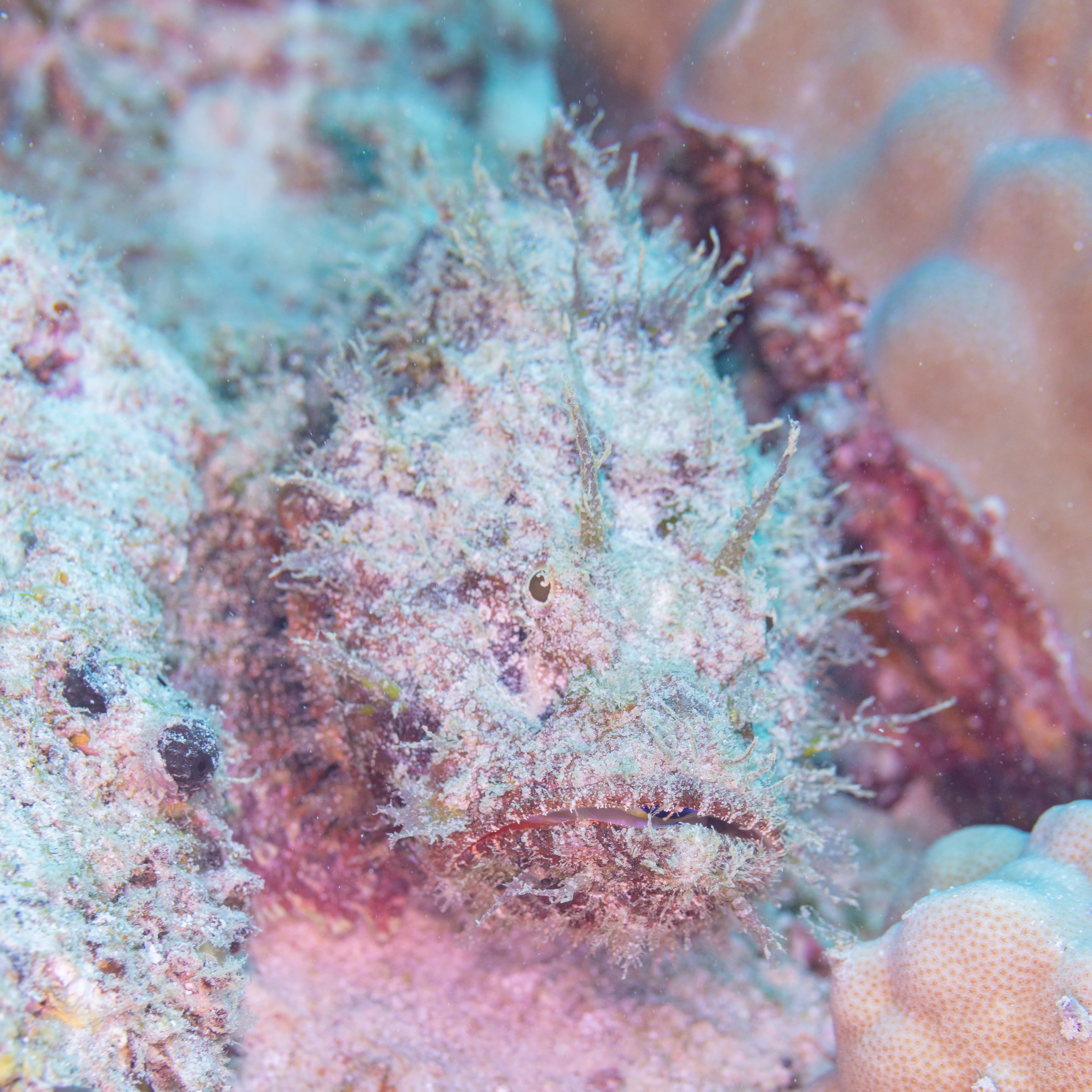

Conservation status
- Least Concern (IUCN 3.1)

Scientific classification
- Kingdom: Animalia
- Phylum: Chordata
- Class: Actinopterygii
- Division: Teleostei
- Order: Perciformes
- Family: Scorpaenidae
- Genus: Scorpaenopsis
- Species: S. diabolus

Binomial name
- Scorpaenopsis diabolus (Cuvier, 1829)

Synonyms
- Scorpaena diabolus Cuvier, 1829; Scorpaenopsis catocala Jordan & Evermann, 1903

= Scorpaenopsis diabolus =

Species of fish

Scorpaenopsis diabolus, the false stonefish, false scorpionfish or the devil scorpionfish, is a species of venomous marine ray-finned fish belonging to the family Scorpaenidae, the scorpionfishes. It has venomous spines and lives in the tropical Indian and Pacific Oceans as well as in the Red Sea. It is a bottom-dwelling predator that relies on its camouflage to catch passing prey.

== Taxonomy ==
Scorpaenopsis diabolus was first formally described as Scorpaena diabolus by the French zoologist Georges Cuvier with the type locality given as "Mer du Croisic", a name for the northern Bay of Biscay, this is clearly erroneous, as this species is only found in the Indo-West Pacific. The specific name diabolus means "devil", probably a reference to the venomous spines in its dorsal-fin. In 1829 Cuvier & Valenciennes wrote in the Histoire naturelle des poissons that the locals in the Moluccas Islands of Indonesia avoid this fish as its name represents a "bad omen", and that its venom had killed two locals following "frightful suffering".

== Description ==
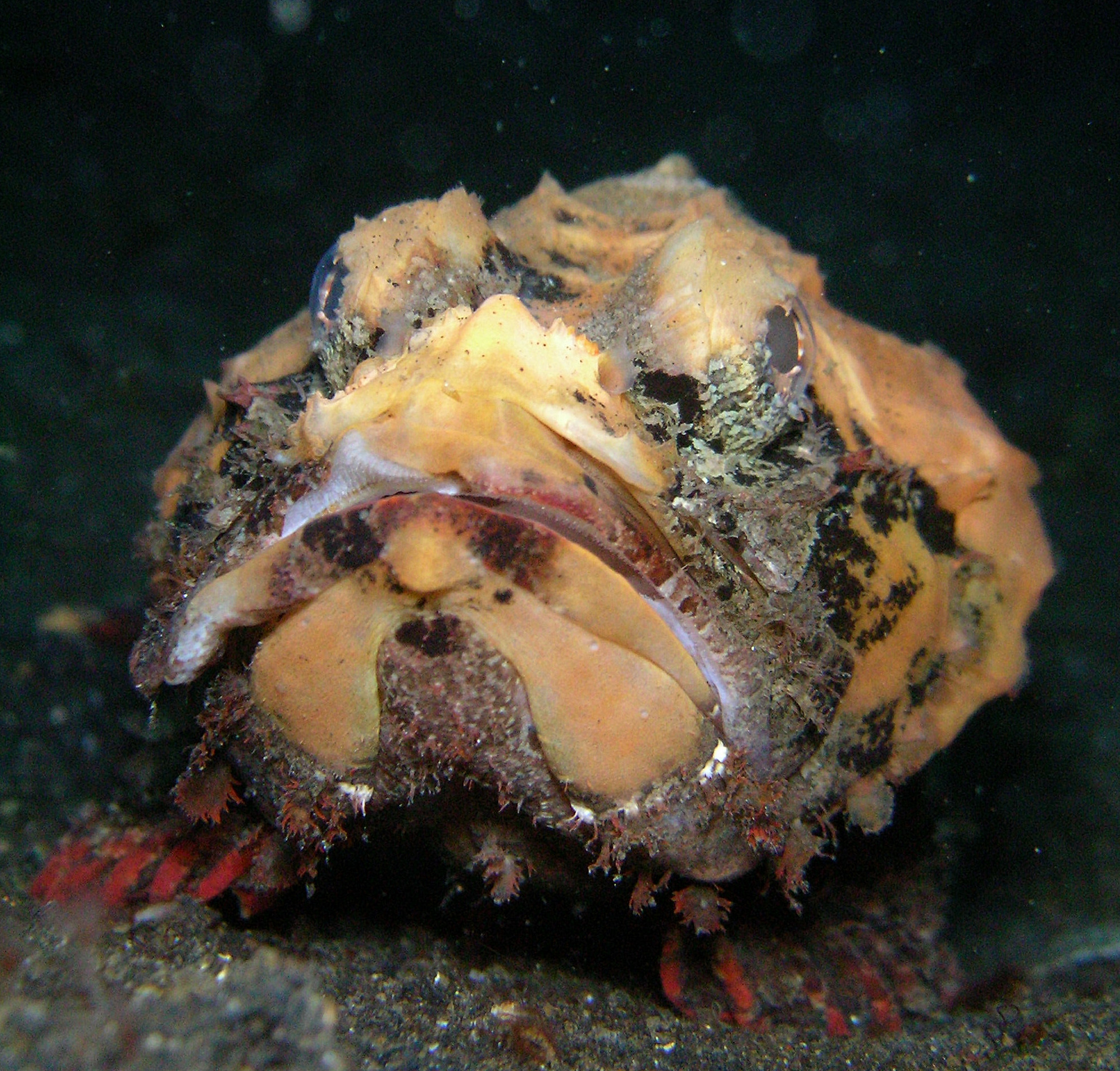
Scorpaenopsis diabolus

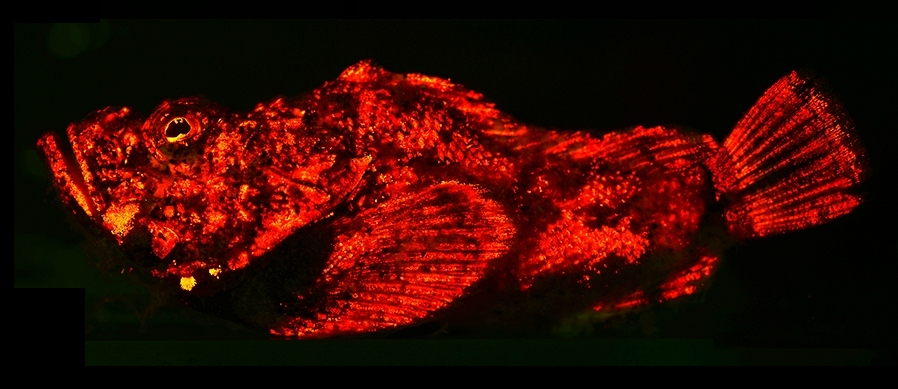
Biofluorescence of Scorpaenopsis diabolus

Scorpaenopsis diabolus has a broad head with a wide mouth, a humped back, and a tapering body, and can reach 30 cm (12 in) in length. Its dorsal fin has 12 venomous spines and eight to 10 soft rays. The anal fin has three spines and five to six soft rays. The skin is rough with low conical projections, spines, and tassels. The colouring is a combination of mottled grey and white with reddish-brown blotches and the fish is well-camouflaged among stones and corals. The inner sides of the broad pectoral fins have orange, black, and white blotches and the fins can be "flashed" as a warning. This fish closely resembles the reef stonefish (Synanceia verrucosa).

Scorpaenopsis diabolus exhibits biofluorescence, that is, when illuminated by blue or ultraviolet light, it re-emits it as red, and appears differently than under white light illumination. Biofluorescence may assist in intraspecific communication and camouflage.

== Distribution and habitat ==
Scorpaenopsis diabolus is found at depths to about 70 m (230 ft) in the Indian and Pacific Oceans. Its range extends from South and East Africa and the Red Sea to Japan, Hawaii, French Polynesia, Australia, and New Caledonia. It is found on the seabed among rubble, seaweed-covered rocks or on rocks encrusted with coralline algae on reef flats, lagoons, and the seaward side of reefs.

== Biology ==
Scorpaenopsis diabolus is a bottom-dwelling fish and is sometimes partially covered with sediment. It is an ambush predator and feeds on passing prey such as invertebrates and small fish. It flares its pectoral fins as a warning if disturbed by a potential predator. Its venomous dorsal spines can inflict a painful wound.
