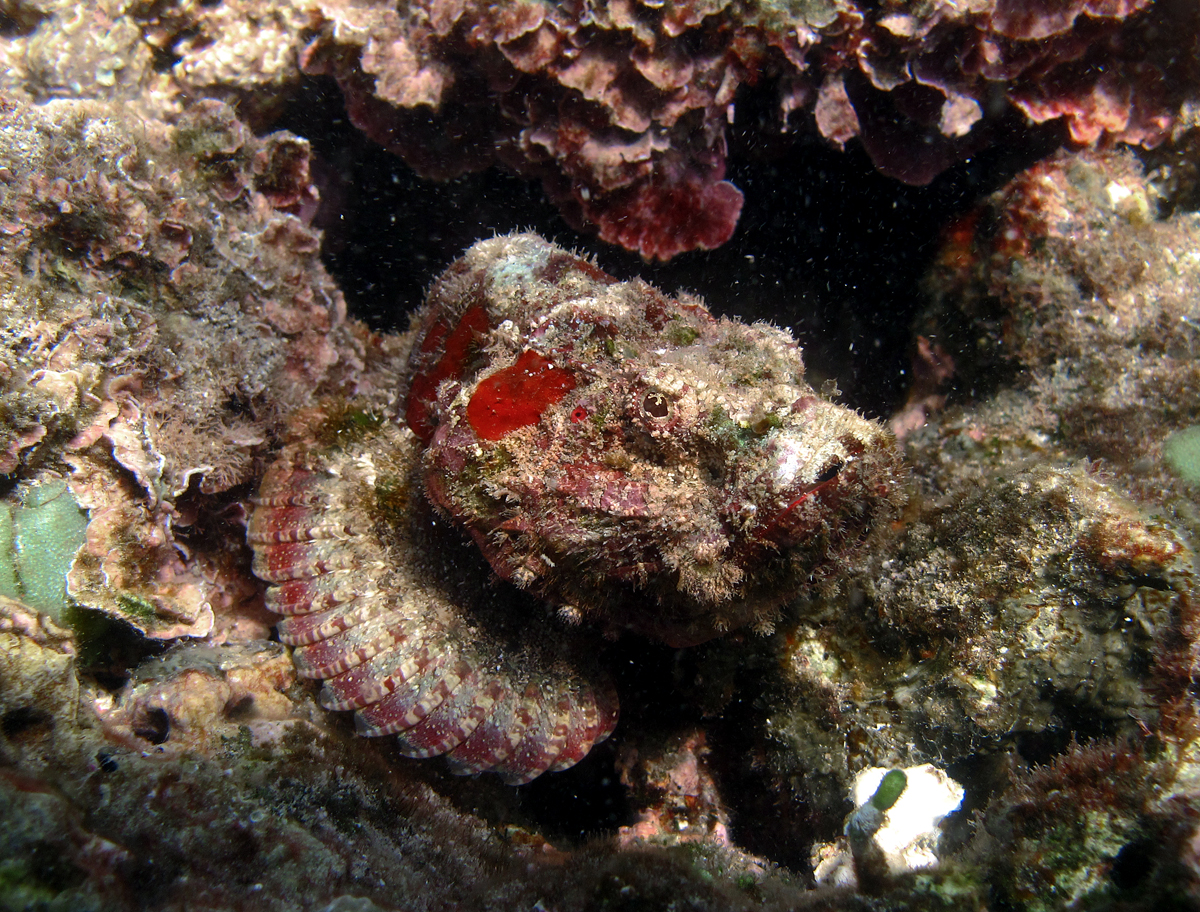
- Réunion

Conservation status
- Least Concern (IUCN 3.1)

Scientific classification
- Kingdom: Animalia
- Phylum: Chordata
- Class: Actinopterygii
- Order: Perciformes
- Family: Scorpaenidae
- Genus: Scorpaenopsis
- Species: S. gibbosa

Binomial name
- Scorpaenopsis gibbosa (Bloch & Schneider, 1801)

Synonyms
- Scorpaena gibbosa Bloch & Schneider, 1801; Scorpaena nesogallica Cuvier, 1829; Scorpaenopsis nesogallica (Cuvier, 1829); Scorpaena axillaris Bliss, 1883

= Humpbacked scorpionfish =

Species of fish

The humpbacked scorpionfish (Scorpaenopsis gibbosa) is a species of venomous marine ray-finned fish belonging to the family Scorpaenidae, the scorpionfishes. This species is found in the western Indian Ocean.

== Taxonomy ==
The humpbacked scorpionfish was first formally described as Scorpaena gibbosa by the German naturalists Marcus Elieser Bloch & Johann Gottlob Theaenus Schneider with the type locality given as with "America" erroneously given as the type locality of this Indian Ocean species. In 1829 the French zoologist Georges Cuvier described Scorpaenopsis nesogallica as a new species with its type locality given as Mauritius. The genus Scorpaenopsis was created in 1840 by the Austrian zoologist Johann Jakob Heckel and in 1876 Pieter Bleeker designated Scorpaena nesogallica as the type species of Scorpaenopsis and S. nesogallica was later shown to be a junior synonym of S. gibbosa. The specific name gibbosa means "humpbacked" (dorsa gibbo) a reference to the arced back of this species.

== Description ==
The humpbacked scorpionfish has a dorsal fin which contains 12 spines and 9 soft rays while the anal fin has 3 spines and 5 soft rays. It also typically has 17 fin rays in its pectoral fin and an elevated back. This species attain a maximum published standard length of 21 cm (8.3 in). There is black spot almost the same size as the eye on the inner surface of pectoral fins close to base of its first 5 fin rays.

== Distribution and habitat ==
The humpbacked scorpionfish is found in the western Indian Ocean. It occurs along the coast of eastern Africa from Kenya south to Mozambique and eastern South Africa and in the Indian Ocean off the Comoros, Madagascar, Mauritius, Réunion, Seychelles and as far east as the Chagos Islands. It has been collected down to depths of 15 m (49 ft), it is a demersal species found among rocks and coral.

== Biology ==
The humpbacked scorpionfish is an ambush predator, waiting on the substrate using its excellent camouflage and striking when its prey comes within range. The spies in the dorsal fin have venom glands and they can deliver a very painful sting, but it is not usually dangerous.
