= William N. Eschmeyer =

American ichthyologist (1939–2024)

William Neil Eschmeyer (February 11, 1939 – December 30, 2024) was an American ichthyologist. He was the founder and developer of the database and reference work Catalog of Fishes, hosted by the California Academy of Sciences and available both on-line and in print.

== Early life and education ==
Eschmeyer was born in Knoxville, Tennessee, on February 11, 1939. His father, Reuben Eschmeyer, was the head of fisheries for the Tennessee Valley Authority. Eschmeyer took an undergraduate degree in biology at the University of Michigan, followed by a doctorate in marine biology at the University of Miami.

== Career ==
In 1967 he moved to California and began work at the California Academy of Sciences in San Francisco, where he spent 40 years as curator of fishes. He was also a Research Associate at Florida Museum of Natural History, Gainesville, Florida.

Eschmeyer was the founder of the Catalog of Fishes, a worldwide fish database. This work started with the publication of "Catalog of the Genera of Recent Fishes" in 1990. The first Catalog of Fishes followed in 1998, as three print volumes and a CD-ROM, and the database was subsequently moved online. The name was changed to as Eschmeyer's Catalog of Fishes in 2019. Eschmeyer also co-wrote a popular book on fish, the Peterson Field Guide to Pacific Coast Fishes, and published 61 research articles on fish taxonomy.

== Honors and awards ==
Eschmeyer was awarded the Bleeker Award for Excellence in Indo-Pacific Ichthyology in 2009 for a “lifetime distinguished accomplishments and great contributions in the study of fish systematics in the Indo-Pacific region” and the Joseph S. Nelson Lifetime Achievement Award in Ichthyology from the American Society of Ichthyologists and herpetologists in 2019.

== Later life and death ==
After retiring he became Curator Emeritus at California Academy of Sciences. Eschmeyer died on December 30, 2024, at the age of 85.

== Legacy ==
The following fish are named in his honor:

- Trachyscorpia eschmeyeri Whitley, 1970 (Cape rockfish)
- Rhinopias eschmeyeri Condé, 1977 (scorpionfish)
- Eschmeyer nexus Poss & Springer, 1983
- Apteronotus eschmeyeri de Santana, Maldonado-Ocampo, Severi & Mendes, 2004 (knifefish)
- Scorpaenopsis eschmeyeri J. E. Randall & D. W. Greenfield, 2004 (scorpionfish)
- Phenacoscorpius eschmeyeri Parin & Mandritsa, 1992 (scorpionfish)

== See also ==
- Category:Taxa named by William N. Eschmeyer
