= America First (disambiguation) =

America First is a United States foreign policy slogan prioritizing U.S. interests over those of other nations.

America First may also refer to:

== Arts and media ==
- "America First" (Homeland), a television episode
- America First!: Its History, Politics, and Culture, a book by Bill Kauffman
- America First with Nicholas J. Fuentes, political commentary show hosted by Nick Fuentes
- America First with Sebastian Gorka, syndicated radio show

== Businesses and organizations ==
- America First Association of Minnesota, World War I patriotic propaganda organization
- America First Committee, group that opposed entry of the United States into World War II
- America First Credit Union, based in Utah
- America First Legal, public interest organization founded by Stephen Miller in 2021
- America First Party (1943), isolationist United States political party
- America First Policies, advocacy organization founded in 2017
- America First Policy Institute, think tank founded in 2021

== Places ==
- America First Ballpark, Salt Lake City, Utah, United States
- America First Event Center, arena in Cedar City, Utah, United States
- America First Field, soccer stadium in Sandy, Utah, United States
- The Ballpark at America First Square, South Jordan, Utah, United States

== Other uses ==
- America First: A Budget Blueprint to Make America Great Again, title of the 2018 United States federal budget proposal
- America First (app), smartphone app used for the United States presidential campaign of Donald Trump
- America First Political Action Conference, white nationalist far-right United States political event

== See also ==
- America's First Federal Credit Union, based in Alabama
- See America First, comic opera by Cole Porter
- First American (disambiguation)
