= Arno Michaelis =

American activist

- Born: 1970 or 1971 (age 54–55); Mequon, Wisconsin
- Occupation: Non-fiction author
- Writing career
- Notable works: My Life After Hate; The Gift of Our Wounds

Arno Michaelis (born 1970 or 1971) is an American author, activist and former neo-Nazi. He has written two books and in 2011 co-founded Life After Hate, an advocacy group, with the group's goal being to "build a safer society by making it possible for people to break free from lives of violent hate and extremism through evidence-based interventions.”

== Early life ==
Michaelis grew up in an "alcoholic, emotionally cold household" in Mequon, Wisconsin, and became a bully at school. He began "drinking profusely" at age 14, and became involved with neo-Nazi ideology and music at age 16. He dropped out of high school and went on to front Centurion, a neo-Nazi metal band in Milwaukee for seven years, although he "couldn't carry a tune". Although Michaelis had doubts about the community, he found it difficult to consider leaving.

In 1994, he broke up with his partner, becoming a single parent to their 18-month-old daughter. He broke from the neo-Nazi community later that year, after realizing "if I didn't leave, prison or death would take me from my daughter". By 1996, he was completely divorced from the community. He went on to work in information technology.

== Writing and activism ==
Michaelis was a volunteer with Barack Obama's 2008 presidential campaign.

In 2010, Michaelis self-published a memoir, My Life After Hate, which he revised in 2012. In 2018, he co-wrote the memoir The Gift of Our Wounds alongside Pardeep Kaleka.

In 2011, he co-founded Life After Hate, although by 2017 he was no longer involved with the group.

Michaelis co-founded the community group Serve2Unite with Pardeep Kaleka, whose father was killed in the Wisconsin Sikh temple shooting in 2012.

Michaelis has worked with organizations such as Parents For Peace.

== Personal life ==
Michaelis is based in Milwaukee, Wisconsin. Raised in a non-religious family, he was a practicing Buddhist by 2017.
