= First American =

First American may refer to:

- A name for the first humans to settle the Americas, the ancestors of today's Native Americans
  - The first group in the peopling of the Americas
- First American, a division of the now-defunct Bank of Credit and Commerce International
- First American National Bank, now part of AmSouth Bank
- First American Corporation, a financial information services company

== See also ==
- America First (disambiguation)
- American (disambiguation)
- First (disambiguation)
