= Life After Hate =

American nonprofit organization

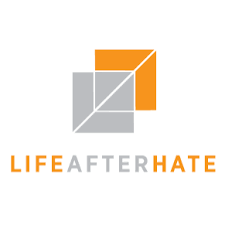
- Founded: 2011
- Founder: Christian Picciolini, Angela King, Arno Michaelis, Antony (Tony) McAleer, Frankie Meeink, and Sammy Rangel
- Type: Non-profit
- Legal status: 501(c)(3)
- Headquarters: 917 W. Washington Blvd., Suite 212, Chicago, IL 60607 USA
- Board of directors: Erroll G. Southers, Pete Simi, Vidhya Ramalingam, Humera Khan, Damian Loth, Tony McAleer.
- Website: https://www.lifeafterhate.org/

Life After Hate is a nonprofit organization founded in 2011 by Arno Michaelis, Sammy Rangel, Angela King, Christian Picciolini, Tony McAleer, and Frank Meeink. The organization was named after an online blog entitled "Life After Hate," created by Michaelis.Its stated mission is to "build a safer society by making it possible for people to break free from lives of violent hate and extremism through evidence-based interventions.” In January 2017, the Obama administration awarded the group $400,000 as part of a grant from the Department of Homeland Security (DHS) Countering Violent Extremism Task Force. However, DHS advisor Katharine Gorka and other aides of President Donald Trump decided to discontinue the grant in June 2017. A crowdfunding campaign established after the 2017 Charlottesville Unite the Right rally has raised $429,500 to go towards the organization.

== History ==
Tony McAleer's voice
Recorded June 2018

From the age of 17, Arno Michaelis was deeply involved in the white power movement. In 2007, Michaelis began writing a memoir and co-founded the online magazine Life After Hate.

Angela King is one of the organization's co-founders, is currently its Director of Special Projects, and is the only co-founder employed by Life After Hate. King is an ex-white supremacist who struggled to forgive herself after being a Neo-Nazi. King was raised in Southern Florida by parents she describes as racist and homophobic. King joined hate groups in her early teens after being bullied throughout school and dealing with tensions at home. She found people welcomed her aggressive and violent tendencies. After eight years of being involved with extremist groups, she was imprisoned. In 1997, she was involved in a robbery of an adult video store. After fleeing to Chicago, Illinois, she returned to Florida, where she was arrested and incarcerated at the Federal Detention Center in Miami. She was originally sentenced to seventy months but was eventually granted a reduced sentence for her cooperation.

During her sentence, King met women who held her accountable for her beliefs but ultimately disarmed her aggression with compassion, which began the process of disengagement. King was released in 2001, determined to begin a new life. She completed three degrees, culminating in an M.A. in Issues of Social Concern, and graduated from the University of Central Florida (UCF). The University's literary magazine, Pegasus, interviewed her years later to explore her experiences and life's work.

== Programs ==
=== ExitUSA ===
ExitUSA is an organization that specializes in disengagement of individuals who were previously involved in hate groups and reintegrating them back into society as full functioning individuals that are capable of obtaining jobs and building healthy relationships within their communities. ExitUSA continues to use social media to help the ex-radicals deny their previous beliefs. "Asked about 'the Trump effect,' Picciolini said the president's election has emboldened the white supremacist movement. Calls to ExitUSA, a program through Life After Hate, have gone up from two or three per week before the election to 15-20 per week, he said."

=== #WeCounterHate ===
In partnership with Possible, a company based in Seattle, Life After Hate created a social media business to spread messages of love to combat the hateful comments often displayed. The program uses computers that specialize in detecting hateful tweets. Once detected, #WeCounterHate sends a message to the author of the hateful tweet saying that a dollar will be donated to Life After Hate for every retweet that occurs. After the message is sent, many delete the original post and others will not share it.

== Notable events ==
=== Grant repeal ===
During the Obama administration, Life After Hate was awarded a $400,000 grant to combat extremist groups. This grant was one of 31 grants to organizations countering extremism made in January, 2017 and announced by then DHS Secretary Jeh Johnson. The grant was revoked by the Trump administration due to what Homeland Security explained as a normal review process and not based upon ideology. A former government official close to the Trump administration, however, reported that the grant was revoked in response to Twitter posts critical of Mr. Trump by Picciolini himself. DHS spokesman David Lapan denied these claims stating that this grant and others were reviewed with guidance from then DHS Secretary John Kelly.

=== Colin Kaepernick donation ===
In March 2017, Colin Kaepernick donated $50,000 to Life After Hate for Interventions, travel expenses, social media, analytics software and refurbished laptop computers.
