= Sebastian Gorka =

British-Hungarian-American political analyst (born 1970)

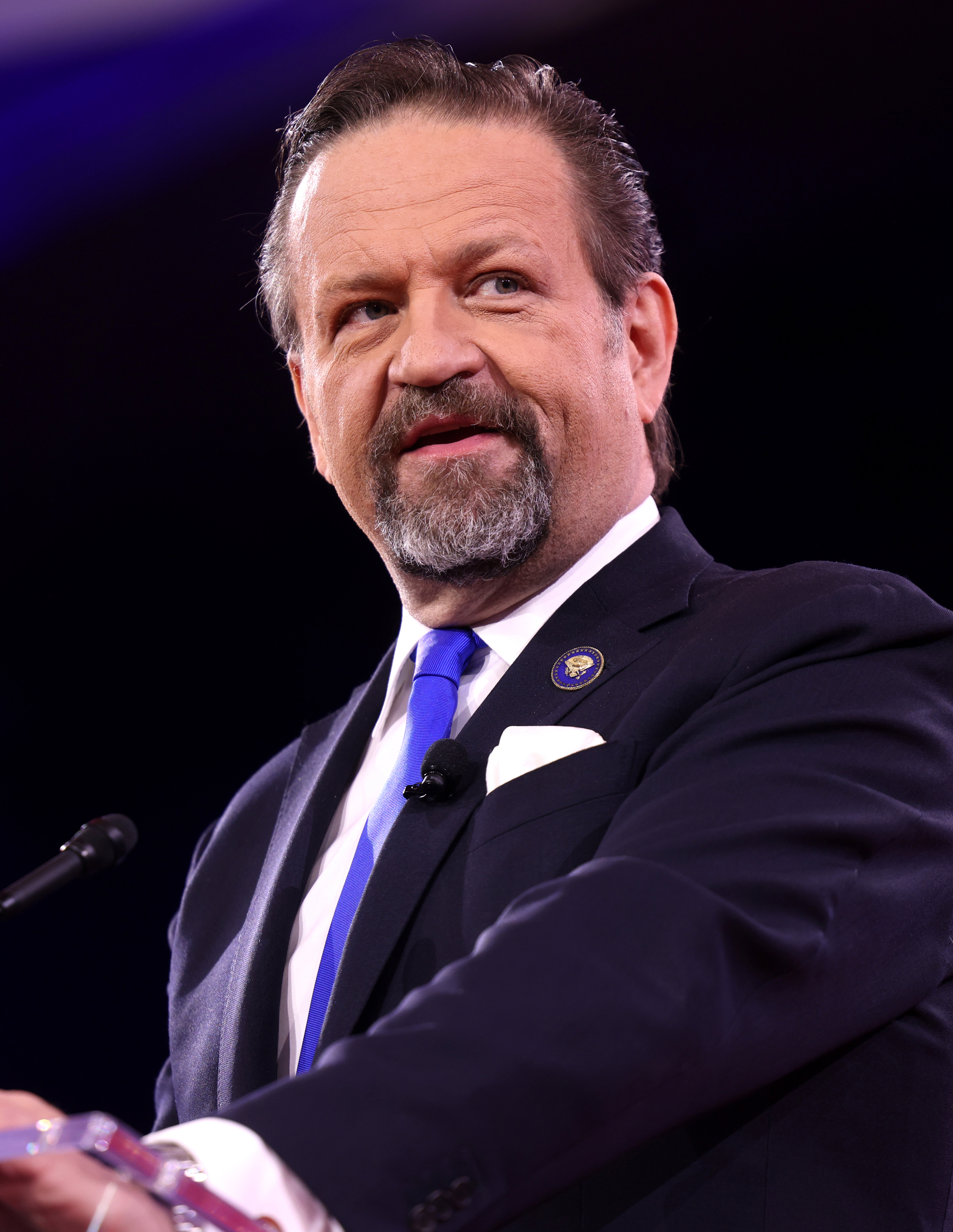
- Gorka in 2025

Deputy Assistant to the President and Senior Director for Counterterrorism
- Incumbent
- Assumed office January 20, 2025
- President: Donald Trump

Deputy Assistant and White House Strategist
- In office January 2017 – August 25, 2017
- President: Donald Trump

Personal details
- Born: Sebastian Lukács Gorka; October 22, 1970 (age 56) London, England
- Citizenship: United Kingdom; Hungary; United States (2012–present)
- Party: Republican
- Spouse: Katharine Cornell (m. 1996)
- Children: 2
- Education: Heythrop College, University of London (BA); Corvinus University (MA, PhD)
- Website: sebgorka.com

Sebastian Lukács Gorka (Hungarian: Gorka Sebestyén Lukács; born October 22, 1970) is an American government official who has served as deputy assistant to the president and senior director for counterterrorism at the National Security Council since January 2025, in the second Trump administration. He previously served in the first Trump administration as a deputy assistant to the president for seven months, from January until August 2017.

Gorka was born in the United Kingdom to Hungarian parents, lived in Hungary from 1992 to 2008, and in 2012 became a naturalized American citizen. Gorka has written several books and for a variety of publications, and from 2019 to 2025 he hosted the nationally syndicated radio show America First with Sebastian Gorka on the Salem Radio Network. He is politically conservative and has ties to the alt-right, though he rejects the term and has condemned the alt-right, calling it "bogus" and "a new label for nationalists or irredentist bigots".

During his time in the first Trump administration, Gorka gave a series of combative interviews with the press in which he defended the administration's positions on national security and foreign policy. Various national security scholars in academic and policymaking circles have characterized Gorka as fringe. Some critics have challenged his academic credentials, his views on Islam and radicalization, and his motives for identifying with the Order of Vitéz and supporting Magyar Gárda, a Hungarian paramilitary organization banned in Hungary in 2009.

== Early life and education ==
Gorka was born in London to Zsuzsa and Pál Gorka on October 22, 1970. His parents had fled to the United Kingdom from Hungary after the failed anti-Soviet 1956 uprising and became naturalised British citizens on February 25, 1963. He attended St Benedict's School in west London, and received a lower second-class honours (2:2) B.A. degree in philosophy and theology from Heythrop College, at that time a constituent college of the University of London.

While at university, Gorka joined the British Territorial Army as a volunteer (typically committing to a weekend a month and an annual two-week camp), serving over a period of three years in the 22 Intelligence Company of the Intelligence and Security Group (Volunteers), an interrogation unit with a NATO role specializing in Russian language training and supporting 1 (BR) Corps until the latter was disbanded in 1992 at the end of the Cold War.

In 1992, Gorka moved to Hungary, where he worked for the Hungarian Ministry of Defence while studying for a master's degree in international relations and diplomacy at the Budapest University of Economic Sciences and Public Administration, now known as the Corvinus University, which he completed in 1997. In 1997, he was a Partnership for Peace International research fellow at the NATO Defense College in Rome.

In 1998, Gorka served as an adviser to Viktor Orbán. In 2002, he entered the political science doctoral program at Corvinus University where he obtained his Ph.D. degree in 2007. Gorka is a naturalized American citizen.

== Career ==
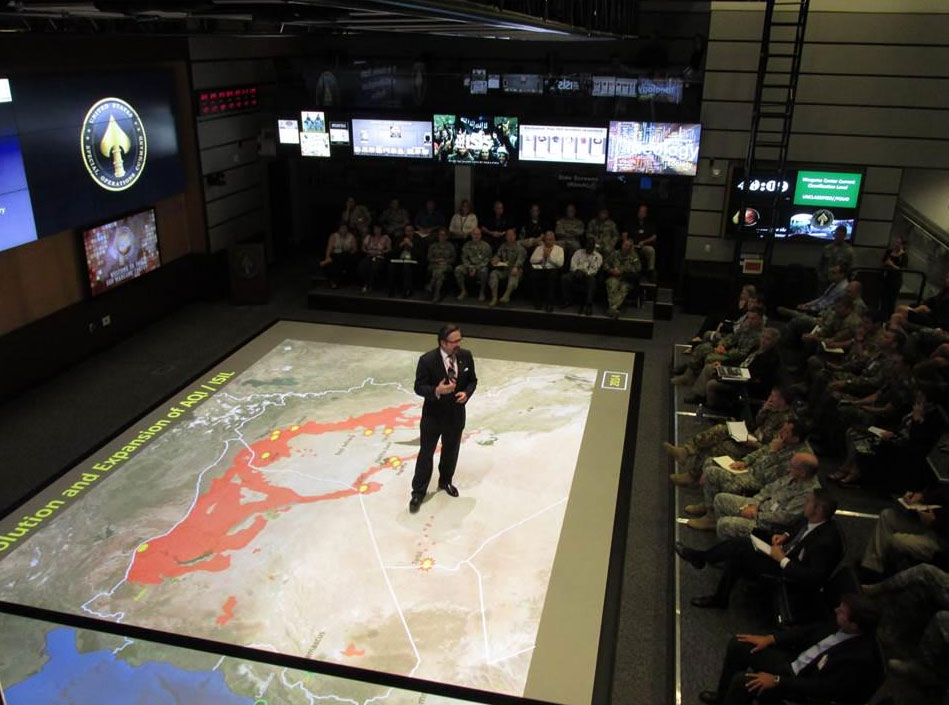
Gorka speaking at SOCOM in 2015

Gorka worked in the Hungarian Ministry of Defense during the prime ministership of József Antall.

Following the September 11 attacks, Gorka became a public figure in Hungary as a television counterterrorism expert. This led to his being asked in 2002 to serve as an official expert on the parliamentary investigatory committee created to uncover the Communist background and alleged counterespionage of the new Hungarian Prime Minister Péter Medgyessy. Gorka failed to obtain the necessary security clearance from the National Security Office to serve on the committee, apparently because he was widely regarded as a spy working for British counterintelligence. Gorka defended himself against the charge by saying his service in the British army was merely as a uniformed member of its counterterrorism unit, tasked with assessing threats from groups such as the IRA.

In 2004, Gorka became an adjunct to the faculty of the new US initiative for the Program for Terrorism and Security Studies (PTSS), a Defense Department-funded program based in the George C. Marshall European Center for Security Studies in Garmisch-Partenkirchen, Germany. At the same time Gorka became an adjunct to USSOCOM's Joint Special Operations University, MacDill Air Force Base. He and his family relocated to the United States in 2008. He was hired as administrative dean at the National Defense University, Fort McNair, Washington D.C. Two years later, he began to lecture part-time for the ASD(SO/LIC)-funded Masters Program in Irregular Warfare and Counterterrorism as part of the Combating Terrorism Fellowship Program but remained in a largely administrative role. Between 2009 and 2011 Gorka wrote for the Hudson Institute of New York (now Gatestone Institute). Between 2011 and 2013, Gorka was an adjunct faculty member at Georgetown University's McCourt School of Public Policy. In 2014 Gorka assumed the privately endowed Major General Matthew C. Horner Distinguished Chair of Military Theory at the Marine Corps University Foundation. From 2014 to 2016, Gorka was an editor for national security affairs for Breitbart News, where he worked for Steve Bannon. In August 2016, he joined The Institute of World Politics, a private institution, on a full-time basis as Professor of Strategy and Irregular Warfare and Vice President for National Security Support. He is on the advisory board of the Council for Emerging National Security Affairs (CENSA).

From January 2019 to January 2025, Gorka was host of the America First with Sebastian Gorka talk show, which was broadcast by the Salem Radio Network.

== First Trump administration (2017) ==
Gorka on a panel at the Conservative Political Action Conference in February 2017

In January 2017, Gorka was appointed deputy assistant to the president and strategist in the Trump White House. He was a member of a White House team known as the Strategic Initiatives Group, which was set up by White House advisors Steve Bannon and Jared Kushner. The Strategic Initiatives Group never got off the ground, and Gorka failed to obtain the security clearance necessary for work on national security issues. Questions were raised about Gorka's precise roles and duties within the Trump administration.

In April 2017, The Washington Examiner reported that the Trump administration was planning to move Gorka to a role outside the White House; however, in May 2017 The Daily Beast reported that Trump and Bannon had intervened to retain Gorka in his position.

=== Credentials ===
Shortly after taking a position in the Trump administration in early 2017, Gorka drew criticism from multiple commentators in academia and politics, who characterized him as a fringe figure in academic and policy-making circles. Business Insider politics editor Pamela Engel has described Gorka as being "widely disdained within his own field."

A number of academics and policymakers questioned Gorka's knowledge of foreign policy issues, his academic credentials, and his professional behavior. Writing in 2017, Andrew Reynolds, then a professor of political science at the University of North Carolina at Chapel Hill, questioned the validity of Gorka's doctoral degree, noting discrepancies between how doctorates are normally awarded and how Gorka's was awarded. Reynolds said that the evaluation of each referee on Gorka's PhD committee was "a page of generalized comments – completely at odds with the detailed substantive and methodological evaluations that I've seen at every Ph.D defence I've been on over the last twenty years." According to Reynolds, at least two of the three referees had only Bachelor of Arts degrees, and one of the referees had published with Gorka previously, in violation of the academic expectation that reviewers have no personal or other form of interest in the success of a candidate's thesis. Georgetown University associate professor Daniel Nexon reviewed Gorka's Ph.D. thesis, describing it as "inept" and saying "It does not deploy evidence that would satisfy the most basic methodological requirements for a PhD in the US". Nexon ran Gorka's thesis text through plagiarism software, finding that portions of it were "repurposed", and concluded that he "might as well have mail-ordered his Ph.D.".

The journal Terrorism and Political Violence had never used Gorka as a reviewer because, according to the associate editor, he "is not considered a terrorism expert by the academic or policy community." In August 2017, Gorka falsely asserted that the Obama administration "invented" the term "lone-wolf terrorism", when the term actually had been widely used in the academic literature, media, and by governments long before that. Responding to his academic critics, Gorka said that there was an ongoing "proxy war" and that others were attacking him as a way to attack Trump.

In February 2017, Stephen Walt, a professor of international affairs at the Harvard Kennedy School of Government, voiced his reservations about Gorka influencing policy in the White House, saying, "Gorka does not have much of a reputation in serious academic or policymaking circles. He has never published any scholarship of significance and his views on Islam and U.S. national security are extreme even by Washington standards. His only real 'qualification' was his prior association with Breitbart News, which would be a demerit in any other administration."

According to BuzzFeed, Gorka was unable to obtain a security clearance to work in the Hungarian Parliament.

=== Resignation ===
On August 25, 2017, Gorka's White House tenure ended, one week after Bannon's departure. Gorka stated that he had resigned because White House officials were "undermining" the Make America Great Again (MAGA) Platform. The White House disputed his claim that he resigned, but confirmed he was no longer employed there and did not have further access to the White House grounds. "Sebastian Gorka did not resign, but I can confirm he no longer works at the White House", a White House official told Politico on August 25, 2017.

== Post-administration (2017–2021) ==
He was a Fox News contributor from 2017 to 2019. On March 3, 2019, however, Mediaite reported that Fox News had confirmed that Gorka was no longer affiliated with the network.

On January 1, 2019, he began hosting America First with Sebastian Gorka, replacing Michael Medved on Salem Radio from 3 to 6 p.m. Eastern Time.

In September 2019, Gorka became a spokesman for Relief Factor, a fish oil supplement.

In July 2020, the White House announced that Trump would appoint Gorka as a member of the 14-member National Security Education Board. The board addressees "the national need for experts in critical languages and regions" by awarding scholarships and fellowships to students, and grants to colleges and universities.

In April 2021, Gorka was permanently banned from YouTube for repeatedly violating the company's policy on spreading misinformation related to the 2020 presidential election. Gorka's America First radio show had previously been banned from the site in 2019 for copyright violations, specifically due to Gorka's refusal to stop playing the Imagine Dragons song "Radioactive" in his intro segment.

In 2021, Gorka began hosting a weekend program called The Gorka Reality Check on NewsMax TV.

== Second Trump administration (2025–) ==
In November 2024, Gorka was named to become deputy assistant to the president and senior director for counterterrorism in the second Trump administration. He took up the post at the National Security Council in January 2025.

Gorka led the release of a "United States Counterterrorism Strategy" in May 2026. The document listed "Violent Left-Wing Extremists, including Anarchists and Anti-Fascists", "Legacy Islamist Terrorists", and "Narcoterrorists and Transnational Gangs" as security threats and stated that the administration would "prioritize the rapid identification and neutralization of violent secular political groups whose ideology is anti-American, radically pro-transgender, and anarchist."

== Political views ==
Gorka has been described as conservative but others described him as being far-right. He has ties to the alt-right, though he rejects the term and has condemned the alt-right, calling it "bogus" and "a new label for nationalists or irredentist bigots".

In August 2017 Gorka opposed the Trump administration's decision to send more troops to Afghanistan. In April 2018 Gorka defended the Trump administration intervention in Syria. Gorka supports gun rights and capital punishment. He opposes illegal immigration and gay marriage.

=== Hungarian Guard ===
In a 2007 video, Gorka declared his support for the Magyar Gárda (Hungarian Guard), a paramilitary group described by various sources as neo-fascist and antisemitic. Gorka said that "If we look at the Swiss or Israeli example, when it is about a country, that is small and doesn't have a massive military, then a system can be based on a territorial defense. ... In America, the state supports them, giving old arms. ... After the disturbances of Hungary, last year, a need has risen" to supplement the official military "because the country's military is sick, and totally reflects the state of Hungarian society. ... This country cannot defend itself." He also added, that "We support the establishment of the Hungarian Guard despite the personalities involved." The Guard was formally banned in Hungary in 2009, two years after Gorka left the country, and this decision was upheld by the European Court of Human Rights, due to its racist activities.

=== Views on Islam ===
Gorka's view on Islam and radicalization have drawn controversy. His views have been described as Islamophobic by scholars, journalists, and former US officials Steven Simon and Daniel Benjamin in a New York Times opinion essay, and he has been considered a part of the counter-jihad movement. Gorka sees Islamic terrorism as essentially ideologically motivated and rooted in a totalitarian religious mindset. In his view, violence is a "fundamental" part of Islam, and he rejects other scholars' assessments that Islamic militancy stems primarily from poverty, poor governance, and war. He vigorously backed President Trump's two executive orders that temporarily banned entry to the United States from seven predominantly Muslim countries, and Trump's usage of the phrase "radical Islamic terrorism."

According to Washington Post reporter Greg Jaffe, "Most counterterrorism experts dismiss Gorka's ideas as a dangerous oversimplification that could alienate Muslim allies and boost support for terrorist groups ... Religious scholars are equally withering." Additionally, according to Jaffe, Gorka's views "signal a radical break" from the discourse "defined by the city's Republican and Democratic foreign policy elite" of the last 16 years. For Gorka, "the terrorism problem has nothing to do with repression, alienation, torture, tribalism, poverty, or America's foreign policy blunders and a messy and complex Middle East", but is rooted in Islam and the "martial parts" of the Koran.

In February 2017, former State Department Counterterrorism Coordinator Daniel Benjamin and former National Security Council Senior Director Steven Simon took issue with Gorka's claim that the Obama and George W. Bush administrations had failed to understand the importance of ideology and they gave examples of how government analysts "going back nearly 40 years ha[d] examined ideology's role in Islamic militancy." They argued that by rejecting the role of "poor governance, repression, poverty and war" and failing to realize that "religious doctrine is not their sole or even primary driver", Gorka subscribed to an Islamophobic approach of seeing "Islam as the problem, rather than the uses to which Islam has been put by violent extremists."

Republican Andrew C. McCarthy says "The notion that he is racist, 'Islamophobic' (as opposed to anti-jihadist), or uninformed is absurd." McCarthy, a columnist for the National Review, describes Gorka's first book Defeating Jihad: The Winnable War as a good "primer on the Islamic doctrinal and scholarly roots of jihadist terror," particularly "takfiri jihad" targeting fellow Muslims. Gorka believes that the jihadi threat is an ideological one that has to be addressed in manners similar to past totalitarian ideologies of the Cold War. According to him, it is crucial to empower Muslim allies, as this is a battle within Islam.

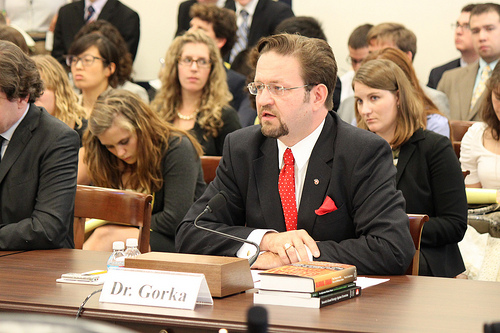
Gorka testifying to the House Armed Services Committee, Subcommittee on Emerging Threats and Capabilities regarding terrorism, June 22, 2011

=== Historical Order of Vitéz ===
The Order of Vitéz was a Hungarian order of merit founded in 1920 to reward heroic soldiers. It entitled the bearer to the title vitéz (literally: "valiant"), as well as a grant of land. The title was inheritable, passing from father to son. Like all such orders in Hungary, it was disbanded at the end of World War II. The U.S. State Department lists the Order of Vitéz among organizations that were "under the direction of the Nazi government of Germany" during World War II. Since then, a number of private associations have worked to restore the order. The most notable of these is the Historical Order of Vitéz. This Order granted Gorka's father, Paul Gorka, their title in 1979 in recognition of his resistance to the post-war Soviet occupation of Hungary.

Paul Gorka's memoir Budapest elárulva ("Budapest betrayed") identifies him on its cover as "v. Gorka Pál", where the "v" is an abbreviation for the title vitéz. Sebastian Gorka has adopted the title in this way in a number of his publications, notably his PhD thesis and his writings for the Gatestone Institute. He also used the title in his June 2011 testimony before the House Armed Services Committee.

In 2017, Gorka appeared on Fox News on the evening of the U.S. presidential inauguration wearing a badge, tunic, and ring of the Order of Vitéz. This gave rise to claims that Gorka himself is a Nazi sympathizer. New York Times reporter Maggie Haberman wrote in April 2017 that Gorka "has been accused of having links to far-right groups in Europe", and The Guardian reported that the Order of Vitez, whose medal Gorka wore to Donald Trump's inaugural ball, "has been linked by some to Nazi colluders".

Gorka's father, Paul, was never a member of the original order and received a "Vitéz" medal from Hungarian exiles "for his resistance to dictatorship" in 1979. Gorka himself stated that he wears this medal in remembrance of his father, who was awarded the decoration for his efforts to create an anti-communist, pro-democracy organization at the university he attended in Hungary. Robert Kerepeszki, a Hungarian expert on the Order of Vitéz, has confirmed that there were ruptures in the organization of the Order of Vitéz on the question of Nazism during the war, many of them died fighting against Hungarian Nazi sympathizers, and Gorka's medal had nothing to do with the war period, but was awarded "for his resistance to dictatorship". The tunic that Gorka wore was just a traditional Hungarian jacket, known as a bocskai. (Note: a bocskai is a dignified, military, traditional garment, ornately braided; a "nobleman's jacket.")

People who have worked with Gorka have said that he is not antisemitic. In February 2017 Congressman and Israel Allies Caucus Co-chair Trent Franks called Gorka "the staunchest friend of Israel and the Jewish people". The Forward's Nathan Guttman responded to Franks' remarks with a statement that co-chair Franks "did not offer any evidence to refute the [Forward's] reports on Gorka's ties with the Hungarian groups", referring to nationalist protest group Hungarian National Committee and political party New Democratic Coalition, which Gorka co-founded with former members of the far-right Jobbik party after growing disenchanted with Viktor Orbán.

Tibor Navracsics, an EU commissioner, member of the Hungarian Fidesz political party and former colleague of Gorka, also defended Gorka, stating that Gorka "has spent his life battling fascists and anti-Semites of all sorts".

Writing in The Jerusalem Post, Bruce Abramson and Jeff Ballabon argue that the Forward's articles are partisan attacks with no merit. Sarah N. Stern, of the Endowment for Middle East Truth, has called Gorka "a true friend to Israel and the Jewish people", adding, "It is folly to 'cry wolf' [about anti-Semitism] at a time like this, when there are already too many wolves in the fold." Peter Beinart, writing in the Forward, says the evidence does not support the magazine's charges of antisemitism.

On March 16, 2017, leaders of one of two successor organisations of the Vitézi Rend stated that Gorka was an official member of the Historical Vitézi Rend faction, to which he is said to have taken a lifelong oath of loyalty. Gorka denied the allegations. The Anne Frank Center for Mutual Respect, the National Jewish Democratic Council, and the Interfaith Alliance have called for Gorka's resignation over his ties to Hungarian far-right groups. The Anti-Defamation League has asked Gorka to disavow the Hungarian National Committee and the New Democratic Coalition.

Democratic Senators Ben Cardin, Dick Durbin, and Richard Blumenthal sent a letter to the U.S. Department of Justice and the U.S. Department of Homeland Security (DHS), requesting that DHS look into whether Gorka "illegally procured his citizenship" by omitting membership in Historical Vitézi Rend, which could have been grounds for keeping him out of the country.

On March 17, 2017, Gorka issued a statement in which he denied that he was a sworn member of Hungarian groups with Nazi past.

== Personal life ==
Gorka married Pennsylvania native Katharine Fairfax Cornell on July 6, 1996, in St. Michael's Roman Catholic Church, Sopron, Hungary. Sebastian Gorka has two children. The couple founded the Institute for Transitional Democracy and International Security in Budapest, Hungary, in 2003.

Katharine Gorka has also been involved with the administration of Donald Trump, first serving on his transition team for the Department of Homeland Security (DHS). She then became a policy advisor at DHS on April 7, 2017. In the wake of the Unite the Right rally in Charlottesville, Virginia, in August 2017, her part at DHS, in defunding Life After Hate, a group which facilitates deradicalization, particularly of white supremacists, received attention.

=== Legal matters ===
Gorka was detained on January 31, 2016, at the Ronald Reagan Airport in Washington D.C. for attempting to board a plane with a 9 mm handgun in his luggage. The gun was confiscated by Transportation Security Administration officers and Gorka, after being detained and issued with a criminal summons, was permitted to board the plane. Gorka said that he had packed the carry-on bag without remembering that it contained a gun. A judge dismissed the charge on February 3, 2017, since he had stayed out of legal trouble for six months, in an arrangement agreed to by the prosecutor.

In January 2018, BuzzFeed News and Hungarian website 444.hu reported that Hungarian police had issued an arrest warrant for Gorka for "firearm or ammunition abuse" on September 17, 2016. They noted that the warrant had been in effect for the entire period of Gorka's service at the White House during the Trump administration, and that the warrant remained in effect as of January 2018. Buzzfeed also reported that the warrant may have been issued for an event occurring as early as 2009. Gorka called the report fallacious, and told Newsweek he was contacting Hungarian authorities for clarification. By mid-February of that year, the arrest warrant had been removed from the website of the country's police.

== Books ==
- Defeating Jihad: The Winnable War (2016), Regnery Publishing
- Why We Fight: Defeating America's Enemies - With No Apologies (2018), Regnery Publishing
- The War For America's Soul (2019), Regnery Publishing
