= Angela King (peace activist) =

American activist (born 1975)

Angela King (born May 26, 1975) is an American peace activist, speaker, and researcher who co-founded the peace advocacy group Life After Hate. King spent eight years in the neo-Nazi skinhead movement before she was arrested, convicted and sentenced to prison for her part in an armed robbery of a Jewish-owned store. She is also a co-founder of ExitUSA, which provides support to individuals who are looking to leave racism and violence behind.

== Early life ==
King was born and raised in South Florida, the eldest of three children. She was raised in a strict conservative family, attended a private Baptist school and Catholic Church services each week. When King was still young her parents divorced; she and her sister lived with their mother, while her brother moved in with her father.

== Career ==
King was arrested in 1998 for armed robbery and served three years in federal prison. There she fell in love with another inmate and the two began a romantic relationship. King has since come out a gay woman. When she was released from prison in 2001, King was dedicated to de-radicalizing and leaving the violent far-right. At the suggestion of her probation officer, she began speaking publicly about her experiences, and attained a master's degree in interdisciplinary studies at the University of Central Florida.

In 2011, she helped co-found Life After Hate and is currently the organization's Director of Innovation & Special Projects. She also co-founded ExitUSA.

In 2018, she was the inspiration for, and was among the cast in, an award-winning virtual reality film, Meeting a Monster, which was produced by Oculus VR and was featured at the Tribeca Film Festival.
