= America's First Federal Credit Union =

Credit union in Alabama, US

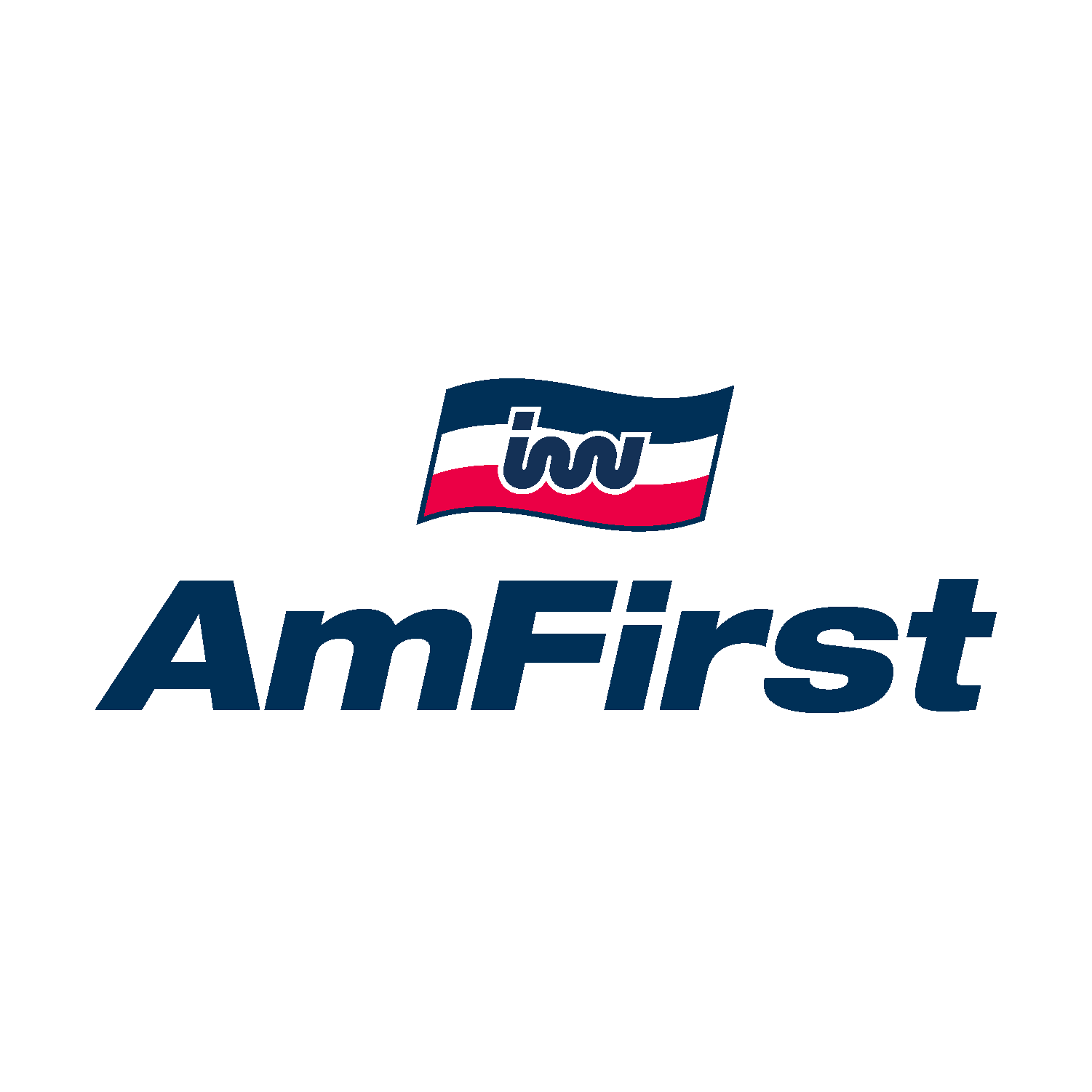
- Type: Credit union
- Industry: Financial services
- Founded: 1936; 90 years ago
- Headquarters: Birmingham, Alabama, U.S.
- Number of locations: 22 full-service branches
- Area served: Birmingham, Mobile County & Talladega County
- Key people: Kevin Morris (CEO)
- Total assets: $1.3B USD (2014)
- Number of employees: 275+
- Website: www.amfirst.org

America's First Federal Credit Union (AmFirst) is a credit union headquartered in Birmingham, Alabama, chartered and regulated under the authority of the National Credit Union Administration (NCUA) of the U.S. federal government. AFFCU is the third largest credit union in Alabama with more than $1.3 billion in assetsand 21 branches.

== History ==
On July 22, 1936, a group of nineteen men founded Iron and Steel Workers Credit Union at United States Steel's Ensley Works facility. With a cigar box to hold its cash and only two types of transactions at first, America's First has grown to become the second largest credit union in the city of Birmingham and the third largest in the state of Alabama.

In July 2024, America's First agreed to a five-year deal with Jacksonville State University for the naming rights of AmFirst Stadium in Jacksonville, Alabama.

== Services ==
The credit union offers a variety of financial services to members:

- Savings accounts
- Checking accounts
- Kids' accounts
- IRA accounts
- Certificates of deposit

It also offers consumer and auto loans, credit cards, mortgages, home equity lines of credit, investment planning services, and insurance services.

== Membership ==
Alabamians are eligible for membership if they live, work, worship or attend school in Bibb, Blount, Chilton, Jefferson, Shelby, St. Clair, Walker, Calhoun counties, as well as certain areas of Mobile and Talladega counties. Additionally, America's First membership is open to employees of more than 1400 Alabama-based companies. As of December 31, 2014, AFFCU had 129,503 members.

== Employees ==
As of December 31, 2014, America's First Federal Credit Union employed more than 275 individuals. AFFCU was included on the Business Alabama Top 10 list of 'Best Companies to Work for in Alabama' for 2015.
