= Katharine Gorka =

American security analyst

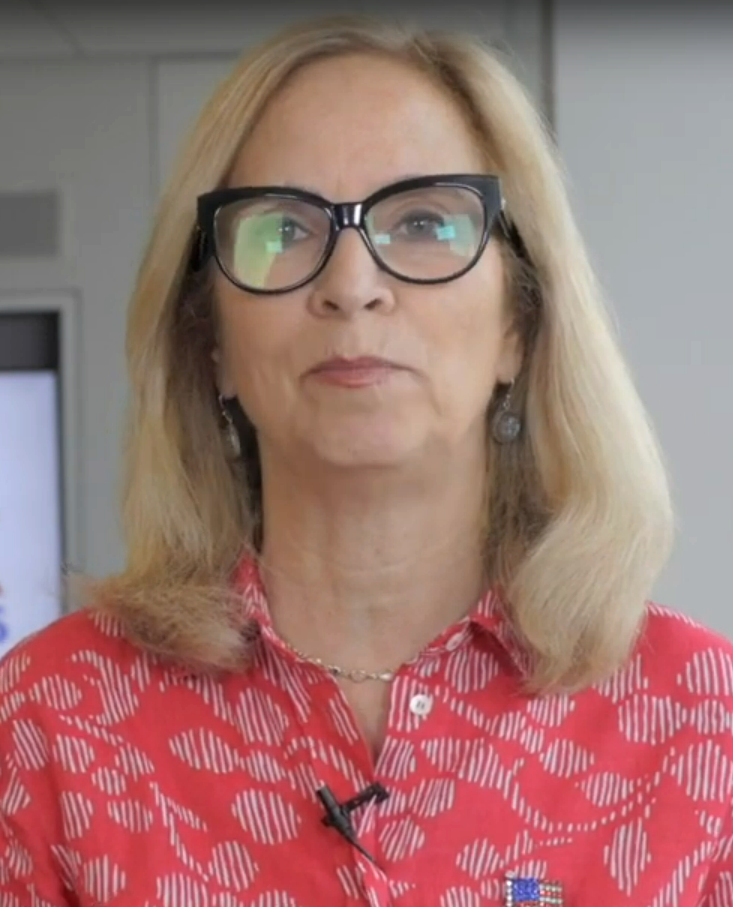
- Gorka in 2024
- Born: Katharine Fairfax Cornell; Boston, Massachusetts, U.S.
- Education: University of North Carolina at Chapel Hill (BA); London School of Economics (MSc)
- Occupation: National security analyst
- Political party: Republican
- Spouse: Sebastian Gorka (m. 1996)
- Children: 2
- Website: katiegorka.org

Katharine "Katie" Cornell Gorka is an American national security analyst who served as a senior policy adviser in the U.S. Department of Homeland Security (DHS) in the first Trump administration from 2017 to 2019. She was also press secretary of the United States Customs and Border Protection (CBP) for two months in 2019.

== Early life and education ==
Gorka was born in Boston and grew up on the East Coast. She attended the Hotchkiss School, a boarding school in Connecticut, and graduated with a Bachelor of Arts in comparative literature from the University of North Carolina at Chapel Hill. Gorka obtained a Master of Science in international political economy from the London School of Economics.

== Career ==
She founded the now-defunct Council on Global Security think-tank and the Threat Knowledge Group consulting firm, which provided counter-terrorism training for the U.S. government and military, and has also been a contributor to Breitbart News and a co-editor of the book Fighting the Ideological War: Winning Strategies from Communism to Islamism with Patrick Sookhdeo.

Prior to her time in the Trump administration, Gorka advocated for an "ideological war" against Islamists, and supported legislation sponsored by Representative Michele Bachmann to designate the Muslim Brotherhood a terrorist organization. She has been described as a part of the counter-jihad movement.

=== Trump administration ===
Gorka was named to the U.S. Department of Homeland Security (DHS) transition team by Donald Trump in November 2016. In May 2017, Gorka was named an adviser to the DHS's policy office. Watchdog groups requested records during her time as a senior adviser at DHS, with the Democracy Forward group suing to get documents.

She became press secretary of the U.S. Customs and Border Protection (CBP) in June 2019, leaving the position in August in order to spend more time with her family.

=== Later activities ===
Gorka served as Director for Civil Society at The Heritage Foundation from 2020 to 2022. She was elected to the McLean, Virginia Community Center Board in 2023.

She was elected chair of the Fairfax County Republican Party in 2024.

== Personal life ==
She lived in Budapest, Hungary, for twelve years from 1996 to 2008, after marrying Sebastian Gorka in Sopron, Hungary, in 1996—two years after they first met in Romania during a symposium for young leaders. The Gorkas have two children together, and frequently collaborate, including by co-authoring policy papers.

== Bibliography ==
- Gorka, Katharine C.; Sookhdeo, Patrick, eds. (2012). Fighting the Ideological War: Winning Strategies from Communism to Islamism. Westminster Institute. ISBN 978-0985310905.
- Gorka, Katharine C. (2013). Cornell Iron Works: The History of an Enduring Family Business. Cornell Iron Works, Incorporated. ISBN 978-0615793498.
- Gorka, Katharine Cornell; Gonzalez, Mike (2024). NextGen Marxism: What It Is and How to Combat It. Encounter. ISBN 978-1641773539.
