= America First Association of Minnesota =

Patriotic propaganda organization from the United States

Location of the American state of Minnesota, home of the America First Association.

The America First Association of Minnesota (AFA) was a patriotic propaganda organization established in the state of Minnesota in November 1917 with a view to assisting the efforts of the United States of America in World War I. The organization was based in the city of St. Paul and was constituted on a county-by-county basis throughout the state. The AFA was one of the leading non-partisan political organizations in that state during wartime.

== History ==
=== Background ===
During the summer of 1917 the upper midwestern state of Minnesota was one of the focal points of the American anti-war movement. The city of Minneapolis was governed by a pragmatic Socialist mayor, Thomas Van Lear, and the heavily White ethnic state was home to a vigorous labor movement and a varied radical press. The People's Council of America for Democracy and the Terms of Peace, an anti-militarist organization established in New York City in May 1917 as a center for socialist and pacifist anti-war activity, sought to hold its first national conference in Minneapolis on September 1 of that year.

The efforts of this group to organize protests against the war effort came as a direct challenge to President Woodrow Wilson and supporters of the national military cause, and a boycott was launched to deny the People's Council use of a meeting hall in Minneapolis. The alternative idea of meeting in a circus tent was advanced, only to be rejected by conservative Governor Joseph Burquist, who just one week before the scheduled start of the People's Council conclave unilaterally banned the group from gathering anywhere in the state.

The organization was thus effectively chased from Minnesota to the city of Chicago, where its national convention was ultimately disbursed by the police. Despite the victory over the perceived radical and pacifist interlopers, patriotic sentiment throughout Minnesota was aroused, providing a fertile ground for pro-military organization.

=== Establishment ===
The America First Association of Minnesota (AFA) was formed in November 1917.

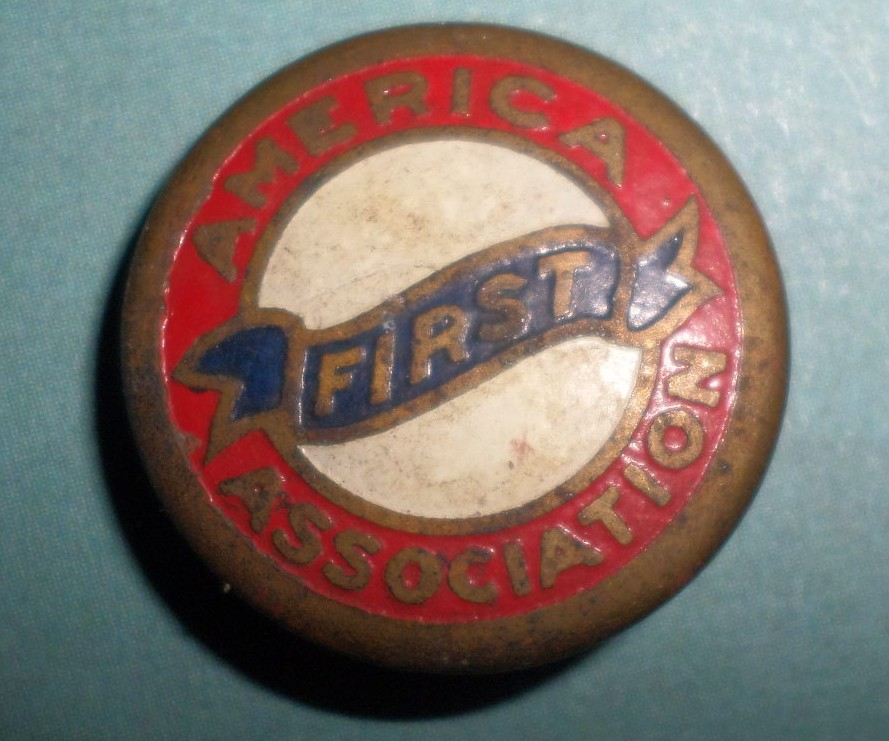
America First Association Button from 1917. Minnesota political organization.

=== Legacy ===
The papers of the America First Association reside at the Minnesota Historical Society Library in St. Paul, Minnesota. The material there includes the group's constitution and bylaws, various resolutions and circular letters, as well as minutes of its executive body.

== Publications ==
- Frank W. Murphy, Americans, Do Your Duty: America First Association of Minnesota Sets Forth Its Principles: Address, Fairmont, Minnesota, November 14th, 1919. St. Paul, MN: America First Association, 1919.
