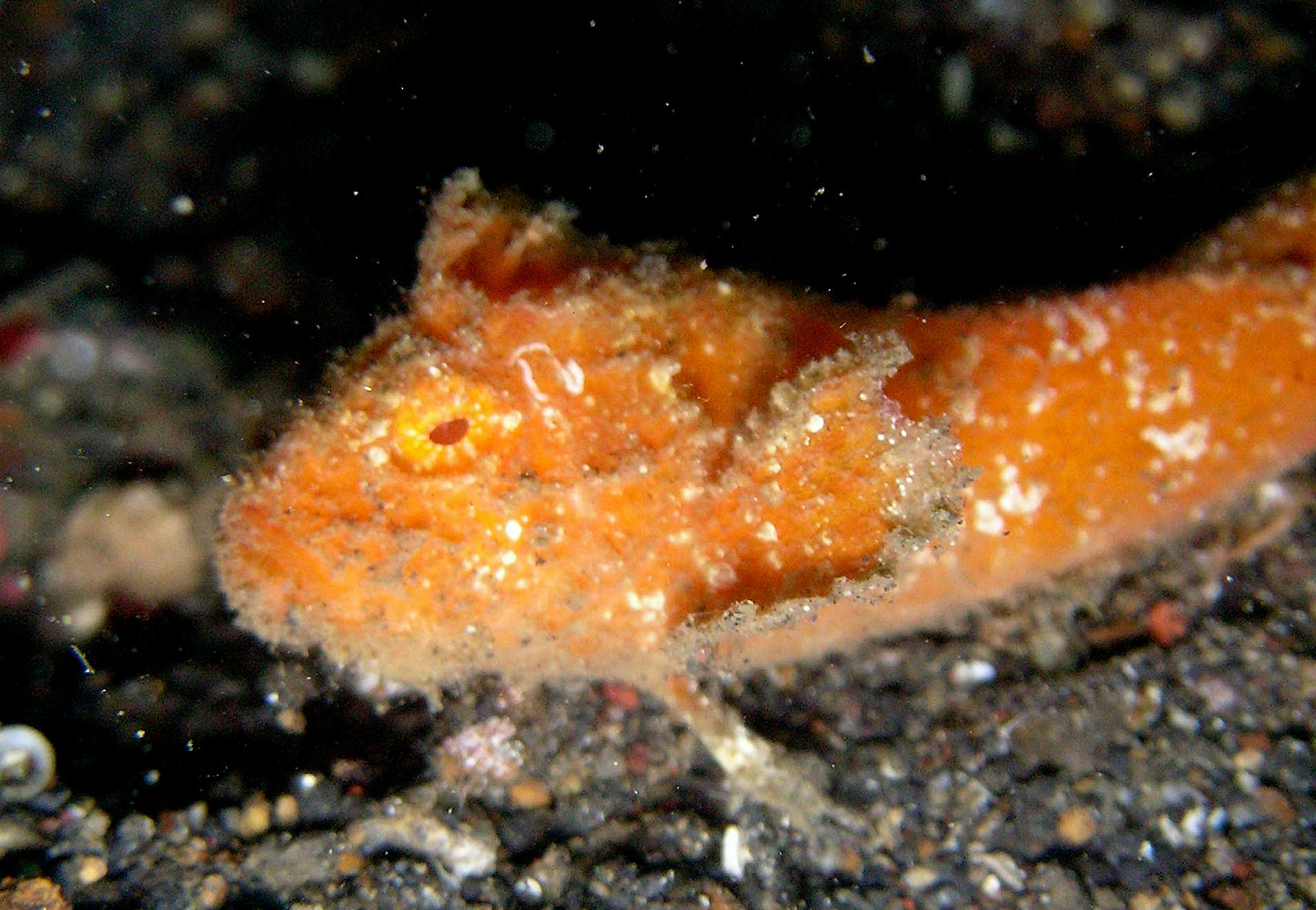
- P. obessi

Scientific classification
- Kingdom: Animalia
- Phylum: Chordata
- Class: Actinopterygii
- Order: Perciformes
- Family: Synanceiidae
- Subfamily: Aploactininae
- Genus: Paraploactis; Bleeker, 1864

Type species
- Paraploactis trachyderma Bleeker, 1865

Synonyms
- Aniculerosa Whitley, 1933; Membracidichthys Whitley, 1933

= Paraploactis =

Genus of fishes

Paraploactis is a genus of marine ray-finned fish, velvetfishes belonging to the family Aploactinidae. The genus is found the Indo-Pacific.

== Taxonomy ==
Paraploactis was first described as a genus in 1864 by the Dutch physician, herpetologist and ichthyologist Pieter Bleeker when he described its type species P. trachyderma from Australia, Bleeker designated it as the type species in the title of his description as well as it being the only species in what was then considered to be a monotypic genus. This genus is classified within the family Aploactinidae in the suborder Scorpaenoidei within the order Scorpaeniformes, although this family is also treated as a subfamily of the stonefish family Synanceiidae within the Scorpaenoidei, which in turn is treated as a superfamily within the order Perciformes. P. kagoshimensis, P. obbesi, P. taprobanensis and P. hongkongensis are thought to form a species complex. The name of the genus, Paraploactis prefixed the type genus of this family, Aploactis with para, meaning "near", the genus being described as being between Aploactis and Trichopleura.

== Species ==
There are currently seven recognized species in this genus:

- Paraploactis hongkongiensis (W. L. Y. Chan, 1966)
- Paraploactis intonsa Poss & Eschmeyer, 1978 (Bearded velvetfish)
- Paraploactis kagoshimensis (Ishikawa, 1904)
- Paraploactis obbesi (M. C. W. Weber, 1913)
- Paraploactis pulvinus Poss & Eschmeyer, 1978 (Pillow velvetfish)
- Paraploactis taprobanensis (Whitley, 1933)
- Paraploactis trachyderma Bleeker, 1865 (Mossback velvetfish)

== Characteristics ==
Paraploactis velvetfishes have a dense covering of prickles on the head and body, these prickles being modified scales, the largest scales are to the rear of the head above the lateral line. The head has an elaborate sculpture of ridges and blunt spines, in some species there is a fleshy pad on the throat. The frontal bone has two obvious ridges that diverge to the rear, creating a pear-shaped depression separating them. The origin of the dorsal fin lies over the centre to the rear of the eye. The dorsal fin has a deep not between the third and fourth spines and the front 4 spines are almost a separate fin. The spines in the dorsal and anal fins are frequently rather flexible and closely resemble the soft rays of those fins. The fin rays are all simple, i.e. they do not have branches. The dorsal fin has 13-15 spines and 8-10 soft rays while the anal fin typically has a single spine, although there are sometimes 2, and 7-10 soft rays. There are 13-14, normally 14, unbranched fin rays in the pectoral fins and the pelvic-fin has a single spine and 3 soft rays. The lateral line scales are in the form of obvious knobs. especially near the head and there are 11-15 such scales in the line. The jaws have tiny villiform teeth, no teeth on the palatine and the vomerine may have very small teeth or they are absent too. These are small fishes which have a maximum known total length of 12 cm (4.7 in).

== Distribution ==
Paraploactis velvetfishes are found in the eastern Indian Ocean as far west as Sri Lanka and the western Pacific Ocean.
