= Threefin velvetfish =

Scientific classification
- Kingdom: Animalia
- Phylum: Chordata
- Class: Actinopterygii
- Order: Perciformes
- Family: Synanceiidae
- Subfamily: Aploactininae
- Genus: Neoaploactis; Eschmeyer & G. R. Allen, 1978
- Species: N. tridorsalis

Binomial name
- Neoaploactis tridorsalis Eschmeyer & G. R. Allen, 1978

Genus of fishes

The threefin velvetfish (Neoaploactis tridorsalis) is a species of marine ray-finned fish, a velvetfish belonging to the family Aploactinidae. This species is found the western Pacific Ocean where it has been found on reefs. This species grows to a length of 5 centimetres (2.0 in) TL. This species is the only known member of its genus.

== Taxonomy ==
The threefin velvetfish was first formally described in 1991 by the ichthyologists William N. Eschmeyer and Gerald R. Allen with the type locality given as One Tree Island off Queensland, Australia. When they described this new species Eschmeyer and Allen classified it in the new monotypic genus Neoaploactis. This taxon is classified within the family Aploactinidae in the suborder Scorpaenoidei within the order Scorpaeniformes, although this family is also treated as a subfamily of the stonefish family Synanceiidae within the Scorpaenoidei, which in turn is treated as a superfamily within the order Perciformes. The name of the genus, Neoaploactis prefixed the type genus of this family, Aploactis with neo, meaning "new", a reference to the un usual form of this taxon in comparison to other velvetfishes. The specific name tridorsalis, means "three dorsals" and is a reference to the three dorsal fins shown by this species.

== Description ==
The threefin velvetfish has two divergent spines on the lacrimal bone and has 5 blunt spines on the margin of the preoperculum, the lower ones being smaller than the upper. The dorsal fin has its origin over the middle of the eye. The first dorsal fin has four spines separated by scales from the second dorsal fin which has a deep notch between the 7th and 8th spines, creating the impression that there are three separate dorsal fins. The scales are very modified, with a robust spine-like flange or a shelf-like projection in their centre set at right angles to the body and supported by an elongated rhomboid base within the skin. There are a total of 12 spines and 9 soft rays in the dorsal fin while the anal fin has 2 spines and 8 soft rays. The maximum published total length of this species is 5 cm (2.0 in). The overall colour is dark to pale grey or pale brown, mottled with irregular white spots and blotches particularly on the fins. There is a pale band to the rear of the eyes, and they sometimes have an orange head.

== Distribution and habitat ==
The threefin velvetfish is found in the western Pacific Ocean. It has been recorded from Rottnest Island and Shark Bay on the western coast of Western Australia, Point Dover in the Great Australian Bight of Western Australia, from Townsville to One Tree Island in the Capricorn Group of the southern Great Barrier Reef off Queensland and from Victor Harbor to Spencer Gulf in South Australia. It has also been reported from the new Guinea, the Solomon Islands and the Chesterfield Islands of New Caledonia. It can be found at depths between 3 and 30 m (9.8 and 98.4 ft) in areas of sand and rubble in the vicinity of reefs, typically at depths of less than 5 m (16 ft).
