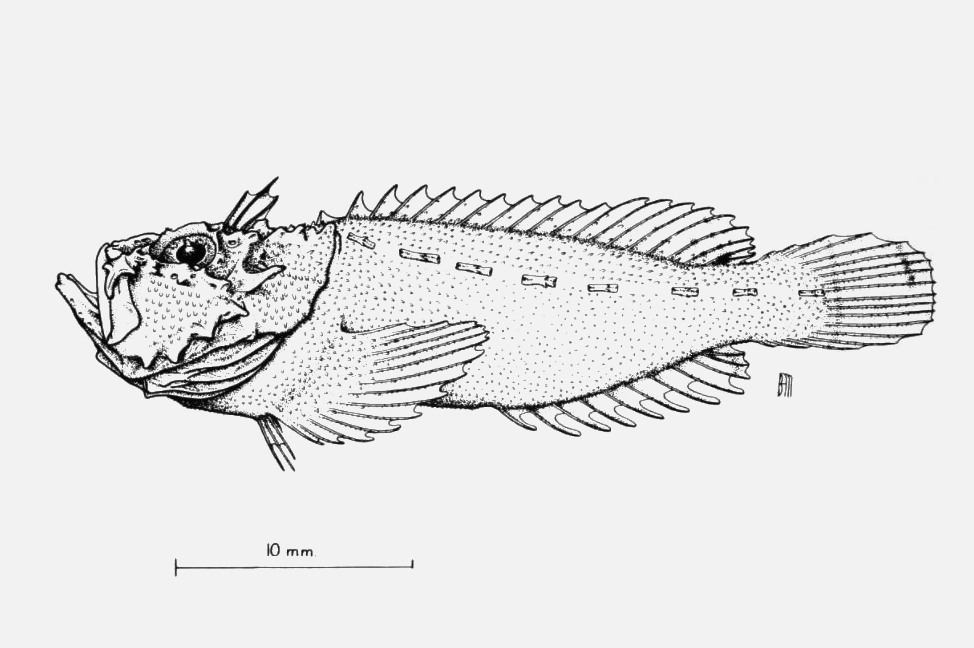
- Illustration of the holotype of the Rough Velvetfish, Xenaploactis cautes, CAS 16105 (28.0 mm SL), 28.6 km from Goh Chuang, Gulf of Thailand, depth 33 m.

Scientific classification
- Kingdom: Animalia
- Phylum: Chordata
- Class: Actinopterygii
- Order: Perciformes
- Family: Synanceiidae
- Subfamily: Aploactininae
- Genus: Xenaploactis; Poss & Eschmeyer, 1980

Type species
- Prosopodasys asperrimus Günther, 1860

= Xenaploactis =

Genus of fishes

Xenaploactis is a genus of marine ray-finned fish, velvetfishes belonging to the family Aploactinidae. This genus is found in the western Pacific Ocean and the eastern Indian Ocean.

== Taxonomy ==
Xenaploactis was first described as a genus in 1980 by the American ichthyologists Stuart G. Poss and William N. Eschmeyer when the reclassified Prosopodasys asperrimus, which had originally been described in 1860 by Albert Günther from the East Indies, to a new genus. Poss and Eschmeyer were also able to describe 2 new species in the genus from museum specimens. This genus is classified within the family Aploactinidae in the suborder Scorpaenoidei within the order Scorpaeniformes, although this family is also treated as a subfamily of the stonefish family Synanceiidae within the Scorpaenoidei, which in turn is treated as a superfamily within the order Perciformes. The name of the genus, Xenaploactis combines xeno meaning "strange" with the genus name Aploactis and this genus was named thus because it differs from other velvetfishes in a number of different features.

== Species ==
Xenaploactis currently has 3 recognized species classified within it:

- Xenaploactis anopta Poss & Eschmeyer, 1980
- Xenaploactis asperrima (Günther, 1860)
- Xenaploactis cautes Poss & Eschmeyer, 1980 (Rough velvetfish)

== Characteristics ==
Xenaploactris velvetfishes have a dorsal fin which is divided into two parts. The 3 anteriormost dorsal fins form a separate fin which has its origin on the cranium to the front of the eyes, there is a wide gap between the 3rd dorsal spine and the 4th. The head is armed with sharp spines, including two obvious spines on the preorbital bone and a robust spine on the infraorbital bone. The head and biody have a dense covering of scales which have been modified with sharp points. The mouth is upturned. The dorsal fin has 3 spines in the anterior fin and 10 spines and 8 or 9 soft rays in the main fin, while the anal fin has 1 spine and 9 or 10 soft rays. These are small fishes with the largest species being X. asperrima which has a maximum published standard length of 4 cm (1.6 in).

== Distribution and habitat ==
Xenaploactris velvetfishes are found in the eastern Indian and western Pacific Oceans. X. anopta from the Philippines, X. asperrima from eastern Indonesia and New Hanover in Papua New Guinea and X. cautes from the Gulf of Thailand, Andaman Sea and northern Australia. They are demersal fishes and X. cautes is found over soft substrates.
