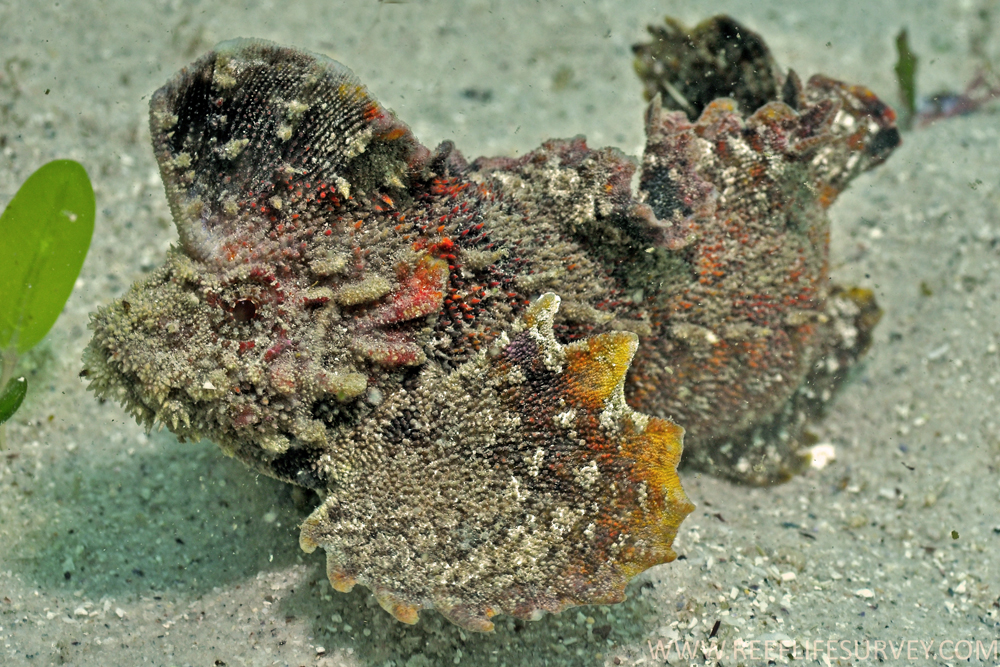

Conservation status
- Least Concern (IUCN 3.1)

Scientific classification
- Kingdom: Animalia
- Phylum: Chordata
- Class: Actinopterygii
- Order: Perciformes
- Family: Synanceiidae
- Subfamily: Aploactininae
- Genus: Aploactisoma; Castelnau, 1872
- Species: A. milesii

Binomial name
- Aploactisoma milesii (J. Richardson, 1850)

Synonyms
- Aploactis milesii Richardson, 1850; Aploactisoma schomburgki Castelnau, 1872

= Southern velvetfish =

Genus of fishes

The southern velvetfish (Aploactisoma milesii) is a species of marine ray-finned fish, a velvetfish belonging to the family Aploactinidae. It is the only member of the monotypic genus Aploactisoma. This species is endemic to the waters around southern and western Australia.

== Taxonomy ==
The southern velvetfish was first formally described as Aploactis milesii in 1850 by the Scottish naval surgeon, Arctic explorer and naturalist John Richardson with the type locality given King George Sound, Western Australia. In 1872 the French naturalist François-Louis Laporte, comte de Castelnau described a new species, Aploactisoma schomburki, and described it in a new genus. Subsequently this was shown to be a junior synonym of Richardson's A. milesii but the new genus was regarded as valid. The genus Aploactisoma is classified within the family Aploactinidae in the suborder Scorpaenoidei within the order Scorpaeniformes, although this family is also treated as a subfamily of the stonefish family Synanceiidae within the Scorpaenoidei, which in turn is treated as a superfamily within the order Perciformes. The name of the genus, Aploactisoma appends soma, meaning "body", to Aploactis, as this genus differs from the dusky velvetfish in having palatine teeth and meristics. the specific name honours a Mr Miles, a collector of fishes in Australia and possibly transported there, who presented the type of this species, among other specimens, to the Museum of Haslar Hospital in Hampshire. Richardson studied the specimen after he established this museum in 1838.

== Description ==
The southern velvetfish has a long dorsal fin which originates just in front of the level of the eye and runs along its back, with just a narrow space between its last ray and the rounded caudal fin. The pectoral fins are long, rounded and have notches between the thickened upper fin rays. The dorsal fin contains between 13 and 15 spines and between 12 and 16 soft rays while the anal fin has a single spine and between 9 and 13 soft rays. The skin is thickened and has a velvet-like appearance. The lateral line runs along the flanks and has knobs and filaments of differing sizes. The colour varies from grey to cream or brown, marked with purplish mottling. This species grows to a maximum published total length of 23 cm (9.1 in).

== Distribution and habitat ==
The southern velvetfish is found in the Indo-Pacific where it is endemic to the temperate waters of Australia, occurring from Minnie Water in the Yuraygir National Park in northern New South Wales soyuth and west to Shark Bay in Western Australia, including the northern coast of Tasmania. This species occurs at depths between 3 and 30 m (9.8 and 98.4 ft) in sheltered waters like bays and estuaries.

== Biology ==
The southern velvetfish is sometimes observed between rocks and sponges, sometimes partially burying itself in the sand. This species is a predator of small crustaceans such as shrimp. The spines in the fins are venomous. It is quite common but its habits and camouflage mean that it is infrequently observed by divers. When it swims it resembles floating seaweed, rolling from one side to the other as it slowly moves across the seabed.
