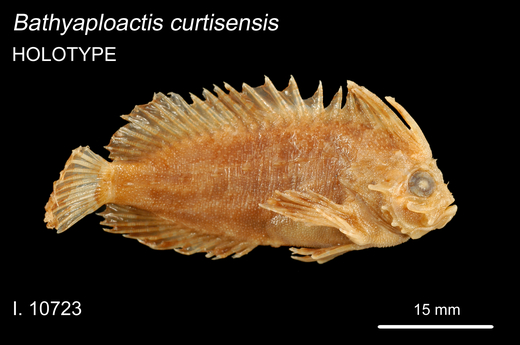
- Holotype of the Port Curtis Mossback (Bathyaploactis curtisensis) from off Gatcombe Head, Port Curtis, Queensland

Scientific classification
- Kingdom: Animalia
- Phylum: Chordata
- Class: Actinopterygii
- Order: Perciformes
- Family: Synanceiidae
- Subfamily: Aploactininae
- Genus: Bathyaploactis; Whitley, 1933

Type species
- Bathyaploactis curtisensis Whitley 1933

= Bathyaploactis =

Genus of fishes

Bathyaploactis is a genus of marine ray-finned fish, velvetfish belonging to the family Aploactinidae. The genus is endemic to the waters around Australia.

== Taxonomy ==
Bathyaploactis was first described as a genus in 1933 by the Australian ichthyologist Gilbert Percy Whitley when he described Bathyaploactis curtisensis, with two subspecies B.c. curtisensis and B.c ornatissima, which are now considered to be valid species. The type locality of this new species was given as off Gatcombe Head, Port Curtis in Queensland. The genus Bathyaploactis is classified within the family Aploactinidae in the suborder Scorpaenoidei within the order Scorpaeniformes, although this family is also treated as a subfamily of the stonefish family Synanceiidae within the Scorpaenoidei, which in turn is treated as a superfamily within the order Perciformes. The name of the genus, Bathyaploactis prefixes the name of the closely related genus Aploactis with bathy meaning "deep". Whitley did not explain this but it is thought that he was referring to this taxon being found in deeper water than Aploactis.

== Species ==
There are currently two recognized species in this genus:

- Bathyaploactis curtisensis Whitley, 1933 (Port Curtis mossback)
- Bathyaploactis ornatissima Whitley, 1933 (Ornate velvetfish)

== Distribution ==
Bathyaploactis velvetfishes are found along the northern coasts of Australia.
