= Ptarmus =

Scientific classification
- Kingdom: Animalia
- Phylum: Chordata
- Class: Actinopterygii
- Order: Perciformes
- Family: Synanceiidae
- Subfamily: Aploactininae
- Genus: Ptarmus; J. L. B. Smith, 1947

Type species
- Cocotropus jubatus J. L. B. Smith, 1935

Genus of fishes

Ptarmus is a genus of marine ray-finned fish, velvetfishes belonging to the family Aploactinidae. This genus is endemic to the waters of the western Indian Ocean.

== Taxonomy ==
Ptarmus was first described as a genus in 1947 by the South African ichthyologist James Leonard Brierley Smith as a monotypic genus for Coccotropus jubatus, which he had described in 1935 from the coast of modern KwaZulu-Natal in South Africa. Later the Red Sea endemic, Tetraroge gallus, which had been described in 1877 by Robby August Kossmann and H. Räuber from off Eritrea, was reclassified as Ptarmus gallus. This genus is classified within the family Aploactinidae in the suborder Scorpaenoidei within the order Scorpaeniformes, although this family is also treated as a subfamily of the stonefish family Synanceiidae within the Scorpaenoidei, which in turn is treated as a superfamily within the order Perciformes. The name of the genus, Ptarmus means "sneeze", an allusion not explained by Smith.

== Species ==
There are currently two recognized species in this genus:

- Ptarmus gallus (Kossmann & Räuber, 1877)
- Ptarmus jubatus (J. L. B. Smith, 1935) (Crested scorpionfish)
