= Deceitful velvetfish =

Scientific classification
- Kingdom: Animalia
- Phylum: Chordata
- Class: Actinopterygii
- Order: Perciformes
- Family: Synanceiidae
- Subfamily: Aploactininae
- Genus: Peristrominous; Whitley, 1952
- Species: P. dolosus

Binomial name
- Peristrominous dolosus Whitley, 1952

Species of fish

The deceitful velvetfish (Peristrominous dolosus) is a species of marine ray-finned fish, a velvetfish, belonging to the family Aploactinidae. This species is endemic to the oceans around Australia. This species is the only known member of its genus.

== Taxonomy ==
The deceitful velvetfish was first formally described in 1952 by the Australian ichthyologist and malacologist Gilbert Percy Whitley with the type locality given as Deception Bay in Queensland, Australia. When he described this new species Whitley classified it in the new monotypic genus Peristrominous. This taxon is classified within the family Aploactinidae in the suborder Scorpaenoidei within the order Scorpaeniformes, although this family is also treated as a subfamily of the stonefish family Synanceiidae within the Scorpaenoidei, which in turn is treated as a superfamily within the order Perciformes. The name of the genus, Peristrominous combines peristroma, meaning "carpet" and Minous which was thought to be a related genus, Whitley did not explain this but proposed the common name "brown carpet fish" which may allude to its benthic habits and camouflage. The specific name dolosus means deceitful, another allusion to its camouflage as well as the type locality of Deception Bay.

== Description ==
The deceitful velvet fish has heavily armoured frontal, parietal, and infraorbital bones with a broad depression between the eyes. The pelvic fins are inserted quite far to the rear of the base of the pectoral fins. The dorsal fin has its origin located to the rear of the level of the eye. It has 3 or 4 spines and the first 3 spines are nearly separate from the rest of the dorsal fin. The anal fin has no spines and 11 soft rays. All of the fin rays are unbranched. There are three warty barbels on each side of the chin and the scaleless skin is covered in warty growths. The head and body have a light-brown background colour marbled with darker coloured markings which to tend to create four vertical bars. It is paler on the ventral surface.

== Distribution and habitat ==
The deceitful velvetfish is endemic to Australia where it occurs in inshore waters in areas of soft substrate.
