= Prosoproctus =

Scientific classification
- Kingdom: Animalia
- Phylum: Chordata
- Class: Actinopterygii
- Order: Perciformes
- Family: Synanceiidae
- Subfamily: Aploactininae
- Genus: Prosoproctus; Poss & Eschmeyer, 1979
- Species: P. pataecus

Binomial name
- Prosoproctus pataecus Poss & Eschmeyer, 1979

Genus of fishes

Prosoproctus is a genus of velvetfish native to the South China Sea where it occurs at depths of from 69 to 82 metres (226 to 269 ft). The only known member of the genus is Prosoproctus pataecus.

== Taxonomy ==
Prosoproctus was described as a genus in 1979 by the American ichthyologists Stuart G. Poss and William N. Eschmeyer when they described Prosoproctus pataecus as a new species from the Macclesfield Bank in the South China Sea. They placed this new species in the new monotypic genus Prosoproctus. This taxon is classified within the family Aploactinidae in the suborder Scorpaenoidei within the order Scorpaeniformes, although this family is also treated as a subfamily of the stonefish family Synanceiidae within the Scorpaenoidei, which in turn is treated as a superfamily within the order Perciformes. The name of the genus, Prosoproctus prefixes proso, meaning "in front", to proctus, which means "anus", an allusion to the anus being positioned immediately behind the base of the pelvic fins instead of close to the origin of the anal fin. The specific name pataecus is derived from Pataikos, a strangely shaped dwarf-like Phoenician deity which was used as a figurehead on the prows of ships, Prosoproctus was presumed to be related to the genus Pataecus when it was described.

== Description ==
Prosoproctus has frontal, parietal and infraorbital bones which are not heavily armoured. The depression between the eyes is slender or does not exist. The origin of the pelvic fin is in front or immediately to the rear of the base of the pectoral fin. The anus is immediately posterior to the pelvic fins, well forward of the origin of the anal fin. It has tubed front nostrils positioned far forward on the snout with elongated and flattened preopercular and preorbital bones. Its scales have a central spine, curving backwards. The two type specimens had standard lengths of 20.6 and 19.9 mm (0.81 and 0.78 in).

== Distribution and habitat ==
Prosoproctus has only been recorded from the South China Sea where this demersal fish has been caught from depths between 69 and 82 m (226 and 269 ft).
