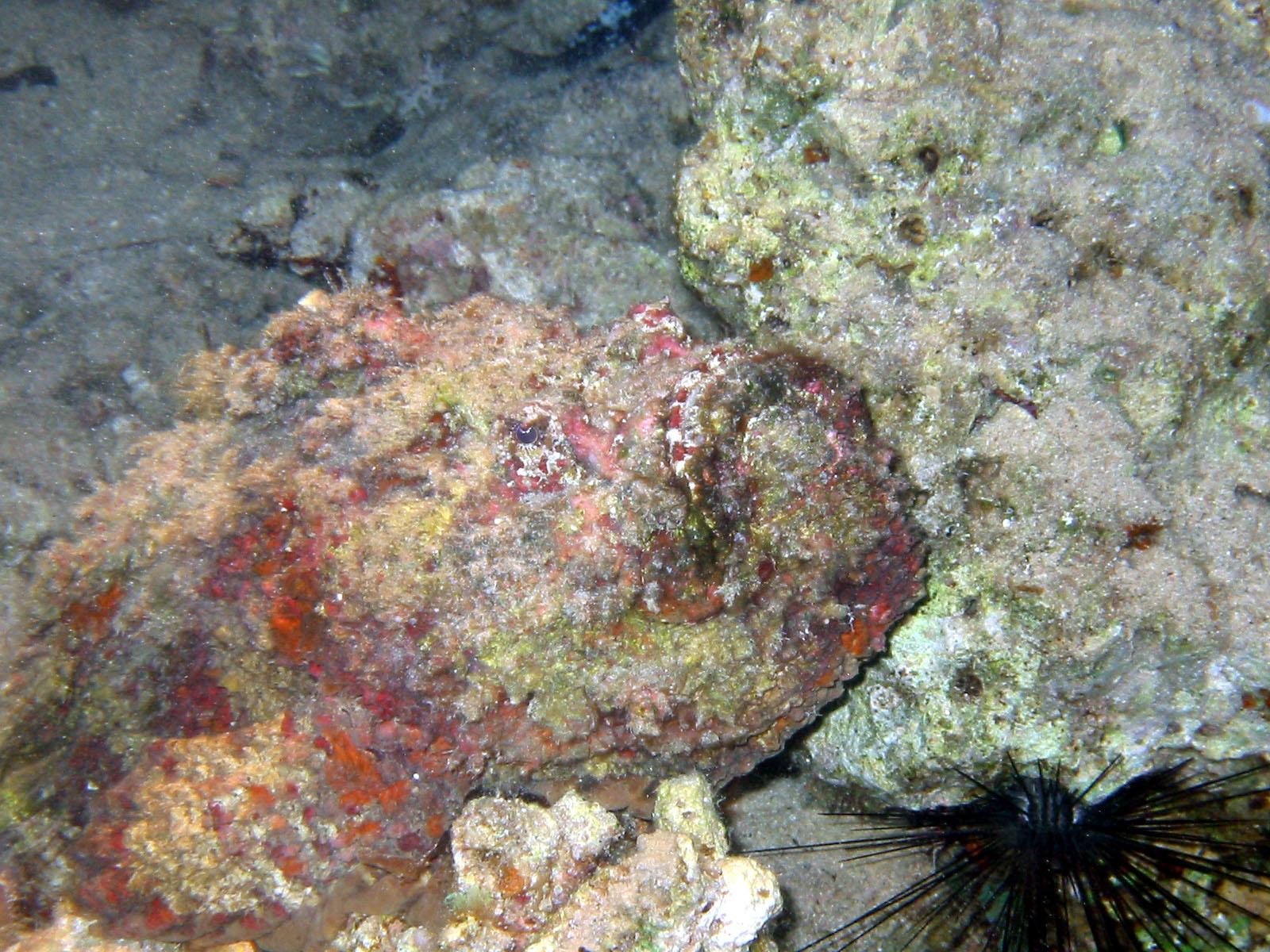

Conservation status
- Least Concern (IUCN 3.1)

Scientific classification
- Kingdom: Animalia
- Phylum: Chordata
- Class: Actinopterygii
- Division: Teleostei
- Order: Perciformes
- Family: Synanceiidae
- Genus: Synanceia
- Species: S. nana

Binomial name
- Synanceia nana Eschmeyer & Rama Rao, 1973

= Synanceia nana =

Red Sea Stonefish

Species of fish

Synanceia nana, the Red Sea stonefish or dwarf scorpionfish, is a species of venomous, marine ray-finned fish, a stonefish belonging to the subfamily Synanceiinae which is classified as being within the family Scorpaenidae, the scorpionfishes and their relatives. It is found in the northwestern Indian Ocean.

== Taxonomy ==
Synanceia nana Was first formally described in 1973 by William N. Eschmeyer and Kaza V. Rama Rao with the type locality given as the bay at El Himeira on the Gulf of Aqaba coast of the Sinai Peninsula in Egypt. The specific name nana means "dwarf" or "pygmy", a reference to the relatively small size of this species.

== Description ==
Length up to 13.5 cm, described as "hazardous" due to the venom contained in its dorsal spines. Synanceia nana has 14-15 pectoral rays as well as 14 dorsal spines all possessing dark margins. The anal fin is composed of three spines and four to six soft rays. Dwarf scorpionfish, as the name would suggest, are relatively small compared to similar species in the genus, never exceeding 135mm. Species in the genus Synanceia earn the name "stonefish" due to their gray color and dotting being similar to that of the stones and reefs they are native to. Raised bumps or "warts" dot the surface. They are also commonly coated in a slime that allows algae as well as sand particles to adhere to their body as a form of camouflage.

== Distribution ==
Western Indian Ocean: the Red Sea and the Persian Gulf at depths between 3.5 and 18 meters.

== Habitat ==
Members of the genus Synanceia are found hiding among rocks and coral in the shallow saltwater throughout temperate and tropical areas of the Indo-Pacific Region. Due to their localization within waters as far North as the Red Sea, it can be inferred that dwarf scorpionfish are most comfortable in warmer waters ranging from 26 °C to 30 °C in ambient temperature. Being a marine fish, Synanceia nana lives in waters with a salinity range of 37-40 ppt within its local region.

== Predation ==
Members of Synanceia are preyed on by multiple predators including sharks, rays and sea snakes. This is possibly due to the venom excreted from their spines to be less effective against these specific organisms.

== Ecosystem roles ==
Not much documentation of the ecosystem effects of Synanceia nana are known, however it can be assumed with relative certainty that they play a role in population control of teleosts, polychaetes, crustaceans, and macro algae which they prey on.

== Behavior ==
Synanceia use their camouflage to blend into their environment for potential prey and to simultaneously conceal themselves from potential predators. When confronted with a potential predator or being threatened, Synanceia erects its dorsal spines so that if vertical force is applied onto the spines, venom is excreted from its glands acting as a presynaptic neurotoxin. Stonefish also use their camouflage for ambush predation as they half-bury themselves or sit between rocks waiting for prey.

== Development ==
With Synanceia nana being difficult to find, documentation of its life cycle has been relatively non-existent. However, it is known that members of the family Synanceiidae have been observed in a larval stage. In other members of Scorpaeniformes, Scorpaena scrofa specifically, embryotic development was observed. The time between fertilization and hatching was measured at 30 hours and 25 minutes.

== Reproduction ==
While reproduction has not been well documented, reproduction is known to be carried out sexually among Scorpaeniformes due to males only possessing testes and not being sequential hermaphrodites.

== Life span ==
Due to poor documentation of Synanceia nana, observation of its life span is minimal. However, in a close relative, Scorpaena notata, life spans have been documented as up to 6 years for females and up to 8 years for males.

== Economic importance ==
Members of Synanceia are not used within the legal aquarium trade due to their highly venomous nature requiring great precautions to be taken when handling them. However, the warty stonefish, Synanceia verrucosa, a close relative has reached new regions as a potential escapee. This could imply that members of Synanceia are sold in illegal aquarium trades.

== Conservation status ==
Synanceia nana is designated "Least Concern" by IUCN Red List due to their abundance as bycatch from fisheries within the Persian Gulf region. While stone fish and scorpionfish are not caught to be eaten, their venom can be denatured through cooking as it is protein based.
