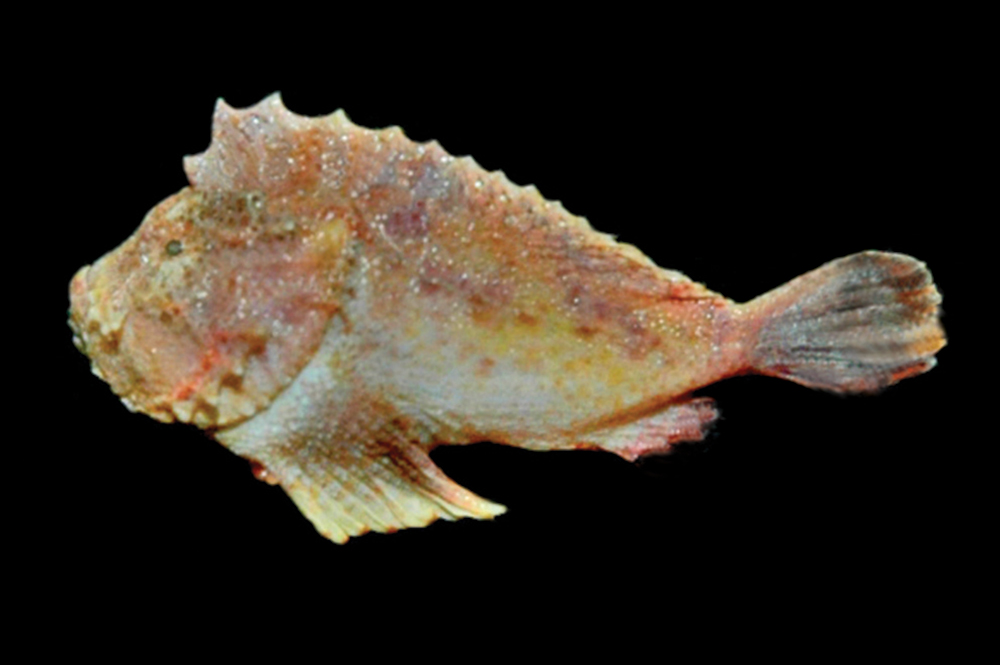
- Kanekonia queenslandica

Scientific classification
- Kingdom: Animalia
- Phylum: Chordata
- Class: Actinopterygii
- Order: Perciformes
- Family: Synanceiidae
- Subfamily: Aploactininae
- Genus: Kanekonia; S. Tanaka, 1915

Type species
- Kanekonia florida S. Tanaka, 1915

= Kanekonia =

Genus of fishes

Kanekonia is a genus of marine ray-finned fish, velvetfishes belonging to the family Aploactinidae. The genus is found in the western Pacific and eastern Indian oceans.

== Taxonomy ==
Kanekonia was originally described as a genus in 1915 by the Japanese ichthyologist Shigeho Tanaka when he was describing the new species Kanekonia florida from Japan, its type species by monotypy. The genus Kanekonia is classified within the family Aploactinidae in the suborder Scorpaenoidei within the order Scorpaeniformes, although this family is also treated as a subfamily of the stonefish family Synanceiidae within the Scorpaenoidei, which in turn is treated as a superfamily within the order Perciformes. The name of the genus, Kanekonia honours Ichiro Kaneko, who supplied Tanaka with fishes from a fish market in Nagasaki, Japan, including the holotype of K. florida.

== Species ==
There are currently four recognized species in this genus:

- Kanekonia florida S. Tanaka, 1915
- Kanekonia leichhardti J. W. Johnson, 2013 (Leichhardt's Velvetfish)
- Kanekonia pelta Poss, 1982
- Kanekonia queenslandica Whitley, 1952 (Deep velvetfish)

== Characteristics ==
Kanekonia velvetfishes are characterised by having a short, deep body with an extremely large head and mouth, with a protruding lower jaw. The preoperculum has 5 blunt spines. The scales take the form of outwardly directed spines, similar to tiny papillae with those on the back and flanks being the largest. They have a continuous dorsal fin which has its origin above the rear part of the eye The spiny part of this fin is longer than the soft-rayed part. The dorsal fin has 11 to 13 spines and 7 to 10 sof rays, while the anal fin has a 1 or 2 spines and between 7 and 9 soft rays. The fin spines do not have venom glands. These are small fishes, the largest species is the deep velvetfish (K. queenslandica) which reaches a maximum total length of 6.4 cm (2.5 in).

== Distribution and habitat ==
Kanekonia velvetfishes are found in the eastern Indian and western Pacific Oceans. These fishes are demersal and are found mainly on sandy substrates.
