= Pseudopataecus =

Scientific classification
- Kingdom: Animalia
- Phylum: Chordata
- Class: Actinopterygii
- Order: Perciformes
- Family: Synanceiidae
- Subfamily: Aploactininae
- Genus: Pseudopataecus; J. W. Johnson, 2004

Type species
- Pseudopataecus taenianotus J.W. Johnson, 2004

Genus of fishes

Pseudopataecus is a genus of marine ray-finned fish, velvetfishes belonging to the family Aploactinidae. This genus is endemic to the waters around Australia.

== Taxonomy ==
Pseudopataecus was first described as a genus in 2004 by the Australian ichthyologist J. W. Johnson when he described the new species Pseudopataecus taenianotus from near Lady Musgrave Island in Queensland. Johnson designated this species as the type species of Pseudopataecus, as well as being the type by monotypy. This genus is classified within the family Aploactinidae in the suborder Scorpaenoidei within the order Scorpaeniformes, although this family is also treated as a subfamily of the stonefish family Synanceiidae within the Scorpaenoidei, which in turn is treated as a superfamily within the order Perciformes. The name of the genus, Pseudopataecus prefixed the genus Pataecus with pseudo, meaning "false", referring to the resemblance of this genus to the otherwise distantly related Pataecus.

== Species ==
There are currently two recognized species in this genus:

- Pseudopataecus carnatobarbatus J. W. Johnson, 2012 (Goatee velvetfish)
- Pseudopataecus taenianotus J. W. Johnson, 2004 (Longfin velvetfish)

== Characteristics ==
Pseudopataecus velvetfishes are characterised by having the head and body being highly compressed with a high number of rays on the dorsal and anal fins. There are ridges on the front of the skull which are curved towards the sides to create a shallow fleshy pit. The first spine in the dorsal fin is located quite far forward on the head, in front of the level of the eye. They are small fishes with the maximum standard lengths being 9.7 cm (3.8 in) in P. carnatobarbatus and 10.4 cm (4.1 in) in P. taenianotus.

== Distribution and habitat ==
Pseudopataecus velvetfishes are found in the eastern Indian Ocean and the western Pacific Ocean. P. carnatobarbus is found in the inter-tidal zone, sheltering in tidal pools among topographical features and vegetation at low tide. while 'P. taenianotus is found on trawl grounds from soft substrates with encrusting benthic invertebrates.
