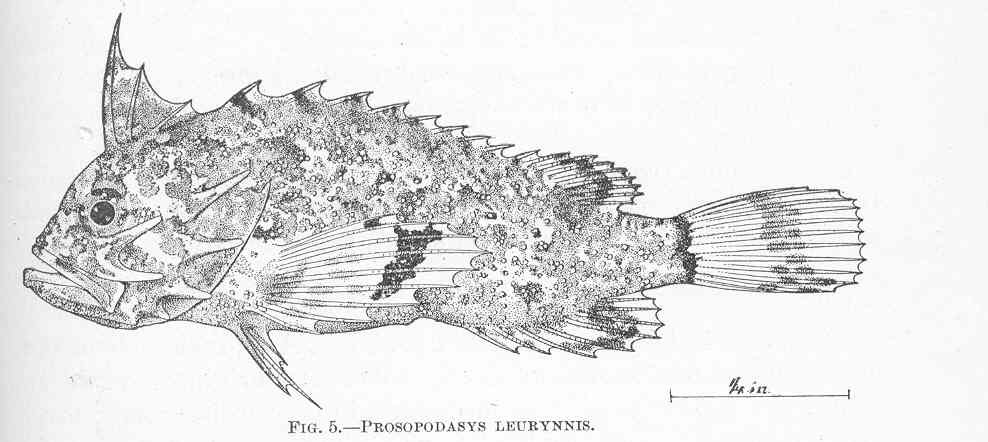

Conservation status
- Least Concern (IUCN 3.1)

Scientific classification
- Kingdom: Animalia
- Phylum: Chordata
- Class: Actinopterygii
- Order: Perciformes
- Family: Synanceiidae
- Subfamily: Aploactininae
- Genus: Acanthosphex; Fowler, 1938
- Species: A. leurynnis

Binomial name
- Acanthosphex leurynnis (D. S. Jordan & Seale, 1905)

Synonyms
- Prosopodasys leurynnis Jordan & Seale, 1905; Cocotropus dezwaani Weber & de Beaufort, 1915

= Wasp-spine velvetfish =

Species of fish

The wasp-spine velvetfish (Acanthosphex leurynnis), also known as the dwarf velvetfish, is a species of marine ray-finned fish, a velvetfish belonging to the family Aploactinidae. It is the only member of the monotypic genus Acanthosphex. This species is found in the Indo-Pacific from India to the Gulf of Thailand.

== Taxonomy ==
The wasp-spine velvet fish was first formally described as Prosopodasys leurynnis by the American ichthyologists David Starr Jordan and Alvin Seale with the type locality given as Hong Kong. In 1938 Henry Weed Fowler placed the species in the monotypic genus Acanthosphex. This taxon is classified within the family Aploactinidae in the suborder Scorpaenoidei within the order Scorpaeniformes, although thios family is also treated as a subfamily of the stonefish family Synanceiidae within the Scorpaenoidei, which in turn is treated as a superfamily within the order Perciformes. The genus name Acanthosphex is a compound of acanthus, meaning "thorn" or "spine", a reference to the two robust spines on preorbital which project rearwards behind each eye and the long and sizeable preopercular spines, with sphex, which is Greek for "wasp", thought to be an allusion to the wasp-like sting delivered by its fin spines. The specific name is a compound of leuros, meaning "smooth", and hynnis, which means vomer, this name was not explained by Jordan and Seale, but may be a reference to the fine teeth on the vomer.

== Description ==
The wasp-spine velvetfish has a highly compressed body. It has between 11 and 15 spines and 7 and 9 soft rays in its dorsal fin while the anal fin has 1 or 2 spines and between 8 and 8 soft rays. The gill openings are restricted to the sides of head. There are two backwards pointing large, robust and blunt preorbital spines, reaching past the rear margin of eye and 4 large spines on the preoperculum with 4 large spines, the upper spine being the largest and the spines decreasing in length with the lowest being the smallest. The overall colour is cryptic and tends to be dark brown to mottled light brown, there are occasionally whitish patches on the head and lower flanks, the pectoral and caudal fins are often white with a brown wavy band on the distal part. There are two short tentacles on the chin. This is a small species which reaches a maximum total length of 3.1 cm (1.2 in).

== Distribution and habitat ==
The wasp-spine velvetfish is found in the Indo-Pacific region. Its range extends from the South China Sea near Hong Kong, west to the Gulf of Thailand and southeastern India and east to Indonesia, Vietnam, eastern Papua New Guinea and south to Australia. Its Australian distribution is localised with scattered records from Whitfords Beach near Kallaroo in Western Australia, around the tropical northern coasts to the Whitsunday Islands in Queensland. This demersal species can be found at depths between 5 and 60 m (16 and 197 ft), living in the interstices on rocky and coral-rubble bottoms, bottoms with coralline algae, or within vegetation.
