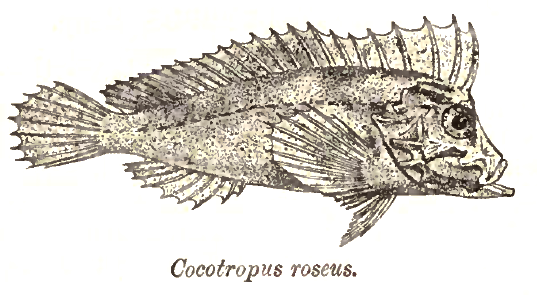

Conservation status
- Least Concern (IUCN 3.1)

Scientific classification
- Kingdom: Animalia
- Phylum: Chordata
- Class: Actinopterygii
- Order: Perciformes
- Family: Synanceiidae
- Genus: Cocotropus
- Species: C. roseus

Binomial name
- Cocotropus roseus Day, 1875

= Cocotropus roseus =

Species of fish

Corcotropus roseus is a species of fish within the family Aploactinidae. They are found in the Indian Ocean in the Maldives and along the coast of India at depths less than 100 m (330 ft). The fish is classified as "Least Concern" in terms of conservation needs.

== Biology ==
The maxrimum total length of Corcotropus roseus is 6.3 cm (2.5 in), with the max published weight being 5.25 grams (0.185 oz). It has 14 dorsal spines, 9 dorsal soft rays, 2 anal spines, 6 anal soft rays, and 27 vertebrae.
