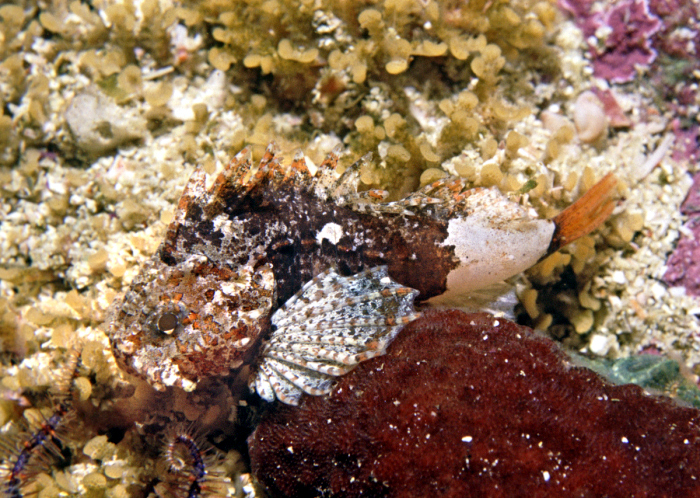

Conservation status
- Data Deficient (IUCN 3.1)

Scientific classification
- Kingdom: Animalia
- Phylum: Chordata
- Class: Actinopterygii
- Order: Perciformes
- Family: Synanceiidae
- Subfamily: Tetraroginae
- Genus: Coccotropis; Barnard, 1927
- Species: C. gymnoderma

Binomial name
- Coccotropsis gymnoderma (Gilchrist, 1906)

Synonyms
- Tetraroge gymnoderma Gilchrist, 1906

= Smoothskin scorpionfish =

Species of fish

The smoothskin scorpionfish (Coccotropsis gymnoderma) is a species of ray-finned fish, a waspfish belonging to the subfamily Tetraroginae of the family Scorpaenidae, the scorpionfishes and their relatives. It is the only species in the monotypic genus Coccotropsis. This species is endemic to the seas off South Africa.

== Taxonomy ==
The smoothskin scorpionfish was first formally described as Tetraroge gymnoderma in 1906 by the Scottish-born South African zoologist John Dow Fisher Gilchrist with the type localities given as Cape St. Blaize, Baird Island Lighthouse, False Island, Rockland Point, Seal Island and Fish Hook Bay in South Africa. In 1927 Keppel Harcourt Barnard placed T. gymnoderma in the new monotypic genus Coccotropsis. Coccotropsis has been placed in its own monotypic subfamily, Coccotropsinae, by some authorities but is included in the subfamily Tetraroginae within the Scorpaenidae in the 5th edition of Fishes of the World however other authorities place that subfamily within the stonefish family Synanceiidae, while other authorities classify this subfamily as a family in its own right. The genus name is a compound of Coccotropus, a genus within the family Aploactinidae and opsis, which means "appearance", so the name means that this taxon is similar to Coccotropus but differs, among other features, in having three anal-fin spines and four anal-fin rays. The specific name, gymnoderma, means "naked skin" an allusion to this species' apparently scale-less, naked skin.

== Description ==
The smoothskin scorpionfish is a small, well-camouflaged fish, it has between 14 and 16 spines and 5 or 6 soft rays in its dorsal fin and 3 spines and between 3 and 6 soft rays in its anal fin. It has an orange body with a distinctive cream patch to the rear. The fish may reach 50 mm in total length. The head has a pleated, wrinkled appearance and the dorsal fin has spines. The head may occasionally be pinkish.

== Distribution and habitat ==
The smoothskin scorpionfish is only found off the South African coast from the Cape Peninsula to Algoa Bay in 9–110 m. It is endemic to this region.

== Ecology ==
This fish is common on reefs but is seldom spotted due to its cryptic colouring and sedentary habits. It is usually not solitary. In keeping with other members of the waspfish family, it is extremely venomous and contact should be avoided. Little is known about the life history or ecology of this scheme.

== Gallery ==
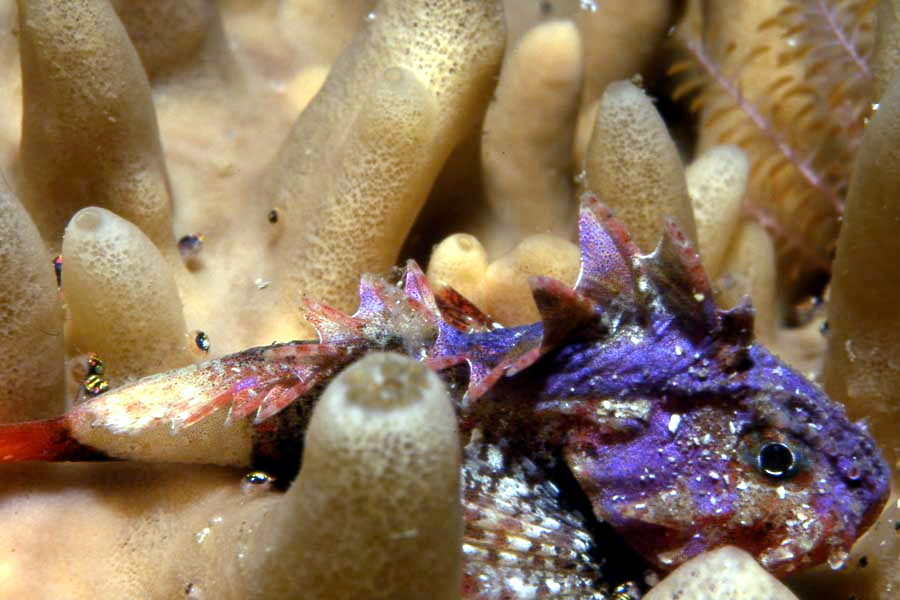
Smoothskin scorpionfish with pinkish head

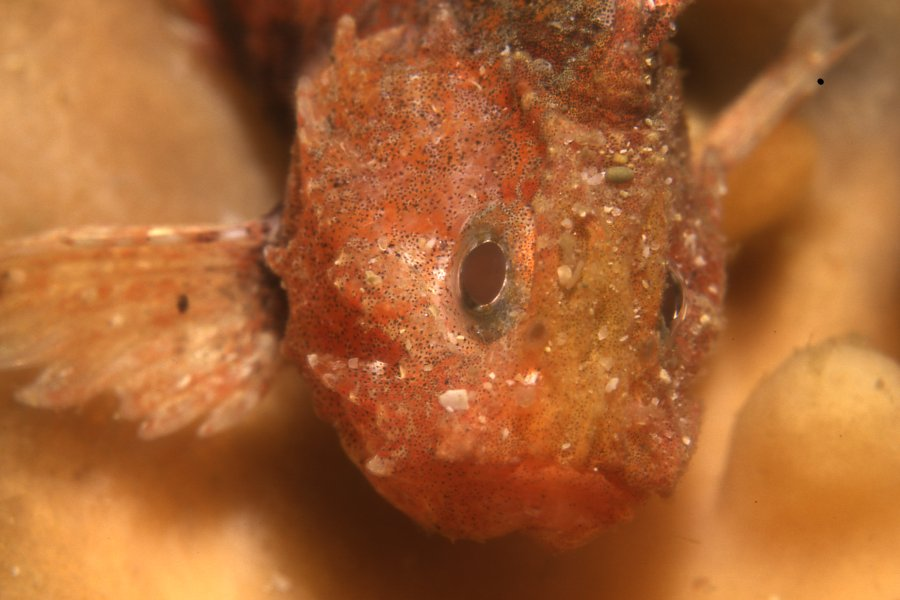
Closeup of head of smoothskin scorpionfish

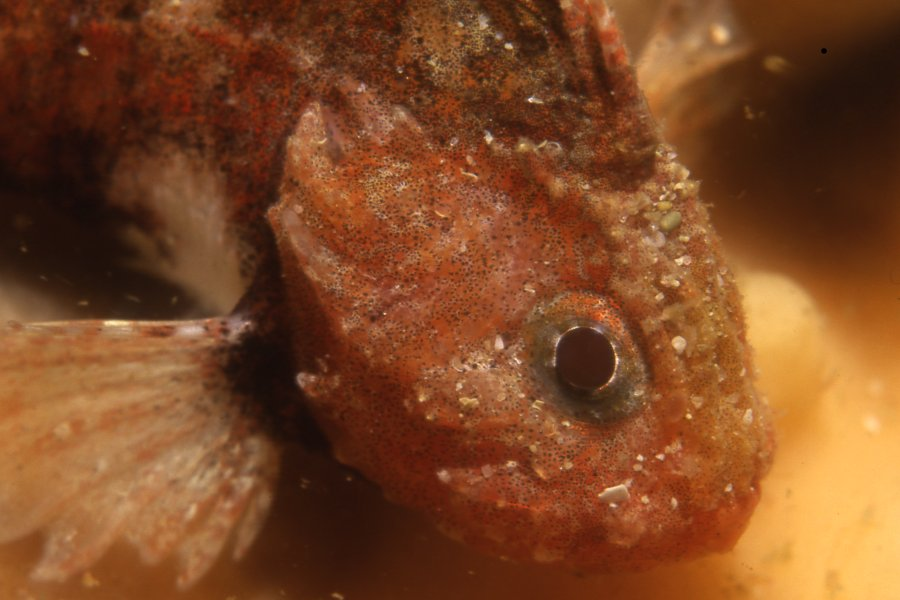
Closeup
