= Rare velvetfish =

Scientific classification
- Kingdom: Animalia
- Phylum: Chordata
- Class: Actinopterygii
- Order: Perciformes
- Family: Synanceiidae
- Subfamily: Aploactininae
- Genus: Matsubarichthys; Poss & G. D. Johnson, 1991
- Species: M. inusitatus

Binomial name
- Matsubarichthys inusitatus Poss & G. D. Johnson, 1991

Species of fish

The rare velvetfish (Matsubarichthys inusitatus) is a species of marine ray-finned fish, a velvetfish belonging to the family Aploactinidae. It is known only from the coasts of Queensland and New South Wales in Australia. It is the only member of the monotypic genus Matsubarichthys.

== Taxonomy ==
The rare velvetfish was first formally described in 1991 by the ichthyologists Stuart G. Poss and G. David Johnson from a holotype which was apparently transitioning from a larva to a juvenile and which was collected from One Tree Island off Queensland, Australia. When they described this new species Poss and Johnson classified it in the new monotypic genus Matsubarichthys. This taxon is classified within the family Aploactinidae in the suborder Scorpaenoidei within the order Scorpaeniformes, although this family is also treated as a subfamily of the stonefish family Synanceiidae within the Scorpaenoidei, which in turn is treated as a superfamily within the order Perciformes. The name of the genus, Matsubarichthys honours the Japanese ichthyologist Kiyomatsu Matsubara for his work on the scorpeaniform fishes. The specific name inusitatus is Latin for"unusual" or "rare", alluding to the single specimen of this apparently quite basal velvetfish.

== Description ==
The rare velvetfish has 6 spines and 6 soft rays in its dorsal fin while the anal fin has 2 spines and 4 soft rays. It has an elongated and uncompressed body with a very large head. It has a rounded caudal fin which has unbranched fin rays. There are no scales on the body other than the elongated scales which make up the lateral line. The large mouth is oblique and the head has numerous blunt spines which are covered in thick skin. The adults have not been collected but it is likely that they have depressed heads which are equivalent in length to half the standard length. The largest specimen had a body length of 8.5mm and the standard length of an adult is estimated to be 1.7 cm (0.67 in).

== Distribution and habitat ==
The rare velvetfish has only been recorded from the western Tasman Sea off the coasts of Queensland and New South Wales from One Tree Island as far south as Sydney. The larvae are pelagic but they settle on the bottom as they mature into adults. The only settled specimen was collected among oysters near a large estuary.

== Biology ==
Rare velvetfishes are little known, at least one larvae had consumed some copepods and the largest specimen was collected near the surface in 30 m (98 ft) of water, suggesting that they may have a daily migration to the surface to forage.
