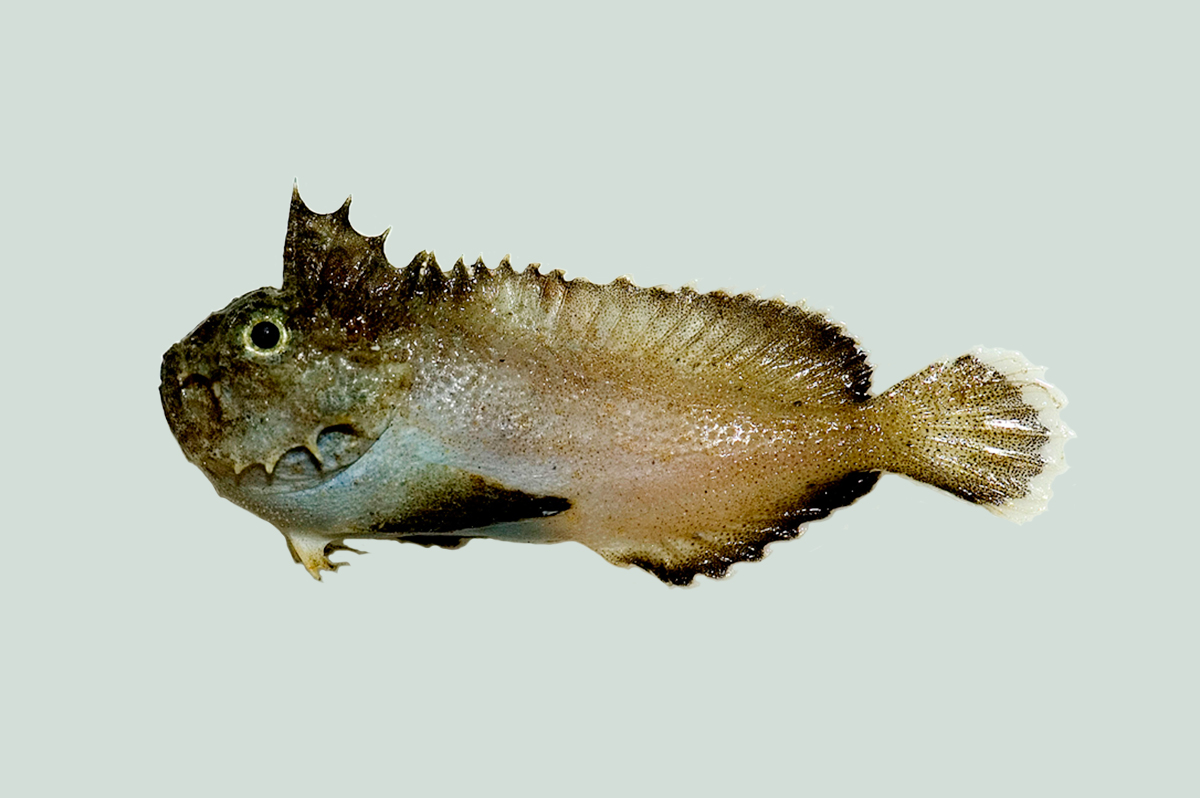
- Erisphex aniarus

Scientific classification
- Kingdom: Animalia
- Phylum: Chordata
- Class: Actinopterygii
- Order: Perciformes
- Family: Synanceiidae
- Subfamily: Aploactininae
- Genus: Erisphex; D. S. Jordan & Starks, 1904

Type species
- Cocotropus pottii Steindachner, 1896

Synonyms
- Aploactoides Fowler, 1938

= Erisphex =

Genus of fishes

Erisphex is a genus of marine ray-finned fish, velvetfishes belonging to the family Aploactinidae. The genus is found in the Indian and western Pacific oceans.

== Taxonomy ==
Erisphex was originally described as a genus in 1904 by the American ichthyologists David Starr Jordan and Edwin Chapin Starks with Cocotropus pottsii, which had been first formally described in 1896 from Kobe in Japan by Franz Steindachner, designated as the type species. The genus Erisphex is classified within the family Aploactinidae in the suborder Scorpaenoidei within the order Scorpaeniformes, although this family is also treated as a subfamily of the stonefish family Synanceiidae within the Scorpaenoidei, which in turn is treated as a superfamily within the order Perciformes. The name of the genus, Erisphex is a compound of eri, meaning "very", and sphex, which means "wasp", this was not explained by Jordan and Starks, but is presumed to be an allusion to the venom-bearing spines in the fins of these fishes.

== Species ==
There are currently four recognized species in this genus:

- Erisphex aniarus (J. M. Thomson, 1967) (Dark-finned velvetfish)
- Erisphex philippinus (Fowler, 1938)
- Erisphex pottii (Steindachner, 1896)
- Erisphex simplex L. C. Chen, 1981

== Characteristics ==
Erisphex is distinguished from other velvetfishes by having a pair of large spines ion the lacrimal bone, the second spine is large and extends down over the maxilla. They also have 4 sharp spines on the preoperculum to the front of the base of the pelvic fins. These are small fishes, the largest species is E, pottii which reaches a maximum total length of 12.1 cm (4.8 in)>

== Distribution ==
Erisphex velvetfishes are found in the eastern Indian and Western Pacific Oceans as far east as New Caledonia.

== Venom ==
Erisphex velvet fishes have venom glands in the base of their anal fin spine.
