= Visitor (fish) =

Scientific classification
- Kingdom: Animalia
- Phylum: Chordata
- Class: Actinopterygii
- Order: Perciformes
- Family: Synanceiidae
- Subfamily: Aploactininae
- Genus: Adventor; Whitley, 1952
- Species: A. elongatus

Binomial name
- Adventor elongatus (Whitley, 1952)

Synonyms
- Membracidichthys elongatus Whitley, 1952

Species of fish

The visitor (Adventor elongatus), also known as the sandpaper velvetfish, is a species of marine ray-finned fish, a velvetfish belonging to the family Aploactinidae. It is the only member of the monotypic genus Adventor. This species is found the Pacific Ocean waters along the coasts of Papua New Guinea and Australia.

== Taxonomy ==
The visitor was first formally described as Membracidichthys elongatus by the Australian ichthyologist Gilbert Percy Whitley with the type locality given as the Tiflis Passage in Moreton Bay in Queensland. Whitley classified his new species in a new subgenus of Membracidichthys which was subsequently recognised as a valid monotypic genus Adventor. This taxon is classified within the family Aploactinidae in the suborder Scorpaenoidei within the order Scorpaeniformes, although thios family is also treated as a subfamily of the stonefish family Synanceiidae within the Scorpaenoidei, which in turn is treated as a superfamily within the order Perciformes. The genus name Adventor is Latin for "visitor", Whitley did not explain the allusion but as this was the only species of its genus, Membracidichthys, which is distributed in Indonesia and the Philippines which visited Australian waters. The specific name, elongatus, means "elongated" as it had the most elongated body in the genus Membracidichthys.

== Description ==
The visitor has a head with a low dorsal profile and a projecting chin and a mouth which does not reach to underneath the small eye. There are villiform teeth on the jaws and the vomer. There is a barbel which hangs over the corner of the upper lip and there are pits and barbel like growths on the chin. There are three blunt spines on the preorbital, pointing in diverging directions, and 2 suborbital spines. The preoperculum has 5 blunt spines on its margin and there is a single weak spine on the operculum. This species has a compressed, long body which is bare of scales but which is densely covered in velvety warts extending to around the eyes. The dorsal fin has its origin clearly to the rear of the eye, the first three dorsal spines, the second of which is the longest, are separated from the rest of the dorsal spines. The ultimate dorsal spine is connected to the higher soft rayed part of the fin which in turn is connected to the caudal peduncle. The dorsal fin has 13 spines and 10 soft rays while the anal fin has 11 soft rays. All the fin rays are simple. The caudal fine is rounded. The overall colour is dark-reddish chocolate-brown, marked with irregular variably coloured paler and darker regions, especially on the fins. There are small dark-brown eyespots on the top of the head, nape, and around the spiny part of the dorsal fin with vague brown spots along the inner rear edge of the gill slit. The holotype had a total length of 10.5 cm (4.1 in).

== Distribution and habitat ==
The visitor has been recorded from Exmouth Gulf in Western Australia to Moreton Bay in Queensland, it has also been recorded in New Guinea. This demersal fish is found in inshore waters.
