= Sthenopus =

Scientific classification
- Kingdom: Animalia
- Phylum: Chordata
- Class: Actinopterygii
- Order: Perciformes
- Family: Synanceiidae
- Subfamily: Aploactininae
- Genus: Sthenopus; J. Richardson, 1848
- Species: S. mollis

Binomial name
- Sthenopus mollis J. Richardson, 1848

Species of fish

Sthenopus is a monotypic genus of marine ray-finned fish, a velvetfish belonging to the family Aploactinidae. It is found in the western Pacific Ocean where it is known from China and Thailand. The only known member of this genus is Sthenopus mollis.

== Taxonomy ==
Sthenopus was described as a genus in 1848 by the Scottish naval surgeon, naturalist and Arctic explorer John Richardson when he described Sthenopus mollis as a new species from the "Sea of China". He placed this new species in the new monotypic genus Sthenopus. This taxon is classified within the family Aploactinidae in the suborder Scorpaenoidei within the order Scorpaeniformes, although this family is also treated as a subfamily of the stonefish family Synanceiidae within the Scorpaenoidei, which in turn is treated as a superfamily within the order Perciformes. The name of the genus, Sthenopus combiunes sthenos, meaning "strong" (although Richardson may have meant asthenos, i.e. "weak"), with pous, meaning "foot", an allusion to the pelvic fins being relatively small in size. The specific name mollis means "soft", a reference to the soft, loose, scale-less skin.

== Description ==
Sthenopus has the 3 front spines in the dorsal fin originating above or just to the rear of the eye and have a wide gap between them and the rest of the dorsal fin. It has a smooth body which is clothedin many elongated cirrhi, particularly towards the front. The lacrimal bone is weakly ossified and has no spines.

== Distribution and habitat ==
Sthenopus is found in the eastern Indian Ocean and western Pacific. It occurs from Singapore to the South China Sea. It is a demersal fish.
