= Eschmeyer =

Eschmeyer may refer to:

- Evan Eschmeyer (born 1975), an American retired professional basketball player
- William N. Eschmeyer, an American ichthyologist
- Eschmeyer nexus, a species of fish in the monotypic genus Eschmeyer
