= PFQ =

PFQ or pFq can refer to:

- Generalized hypergeometric function, a family of mathematical functions denoted as $_pF_q$
- Parsabad-Moghan Airport, an airport in Parsabad, Iran, by IATA code
- Visitor (fish), a species of ray-finned fish in the Pacific Ocean, by Catalogue of Life identifier
- Pingfang District, a district of Harbin, China; see List of administrative divisions of Heilongjiang
