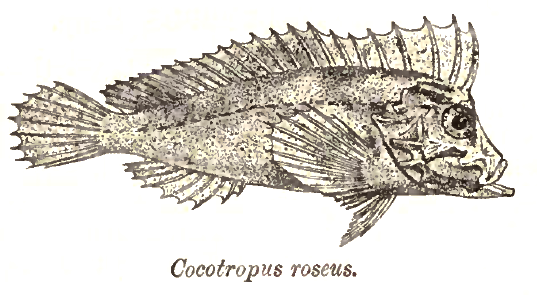
- (C. roseus)

Scientific classification
- Kingdom: Animalia
- Phylum: Chordata
- Class: Actinopterygii
- Order: Perciformes
- Family: Synanceiidae
- Subfamily: Aploactininae
- Genus: Cocotropus; Kaup, 1858

Type species
- Corythobatus echinatus Cantor, 1849

Synonyms
- Insopiscis Whitley, 1933

= Cocotropus =

Genus of fishes

Cocotropus is a genus of marine ray-finned fish, velvetfishes belonging to the family Aploactinidae. The genus is found in the Indian and western Pacific oceans.

== Taxonomy ==
Cocotropus was first described as a genus in 1858 by the German naturalist Johann Jakob Kaup as a monotypic genus, the only species classified within it being Corythobatus echinatus, which had been described in 1849 by the Danish zoologist Theodore Cantor from Penang in Malaysia. The genus Cocotropus is classified within the family Aploactinidae in the suborder Scorpaenoidei within the order Scorpaeniformes, although this family is also treated as a subfamily of the stonefish family Synanceiidae within the Scorpaenoidei, which in turn is treated as a superfamily within the order Perciformes. The name of the genus, Cocotropus was not explained by Kaup but may be a compound of coccum, which means "scarlet", and tropus, meaning "manner" or "way", so a "scarlet fish", however C. echinatus is reddish brown rather than scarlet.

== Species ==
There are currently 17 recognized species in this genus:

- Cocotropus altipinnis Waite, 1903 (Highfin velvetfish)
- Cocotropus astakhovi Prokofiev, 2010
- Cocotropus aurantius Matsunuma, Sado & Motomura, 2021
- Cocotropus dermacanthus (Bleeker, 1852)
- Cocotropus echinatus (Cantor, 1849)
- Cocotropus eksae Prokofiev, 2010
- Cocotropus izuensis Imamura, Aizawa & G. Shinohara, 2010
- Cocotropus keramaensis Imamura & G. Shinohara, 2003
- Cocotropus larvatus Poss & G. R. Allen, 1987 (Ghost velvetfish)
- Cocotropus masudai Matsubara, 1943
- Cocotropus microps J. W. Johnson, 2004 (Patchwork velvetfish)
- Cocotropus monacanthus (Gilchrist, 1906) (Roughskin scorpionfish)
- Cocotropus possi Imamura & G. Shinohara, 2008
- Cocotropus richeri R. Fricke, 2004
- Cocotropus roseomaculatus Imamura & G. Shinohara, 2004
- Cocotropus roseus F. Day, 1875
- Cocotropus steinitzi Eschmeyer & Dor, 1978

== Characteristics ==
Cocotropus velvetfishes are characterised by the gill membranes not being attached to the isthmus which has fleshy extensions. The anus is just in front of the origin of the anal fin while the dorsal fin is continuous. There are parallel ridges between the eyes. The body is covered in velvety scales. The pelvic fin has a single spine and 3 rays. These are small fishes, the largest is the roughskin scorpionfish (C. monacanthus) which reaches a maximum published total length of 13.1 cm (5.2 in).

== Distribution and habitat ==
Cocotropus velvetfishes are found in the Indo-Pacific region from the eastern coasts of Africa to New Caledonia, north to Japan and south to Australia. They are little know fishes most often found sheltering in crevices, underneath coral rubble, or within coral-lined algal areas on either coral or rock reefs.
