= Eosynanceja =

Eosynanceja Temporal range: Lower Eocene

Scientific classification
- Kingdom: Animalia
- Phylum: Chordata
- Class: Actinopterygii
- Division: Teleostei
- Order: Perciformes
- Family: Synanceiidae
- Genus: †Eosynanceja; Casier, 1946
- Species: †E. brabantica

Binomial name
- †Eosynanceja brabantica Casier, 1946

Extinct genus of fishes

Eosynanceja ("dawn Synanceia") is an extinct genus of prehistoric scorpionfish that lived during the Eocene. It contains a single species, E. brabantica, known from the Early Eocene of Belgium.

It is the oldest known scorpaenoid—and one of the oldest definitive crown group perciforms—to be known from body fossils. It is known from portions of the jaw, cheek, and vertebral column.

== See also ==
- Prehistoric fish
- List of prehistoric bony fish
