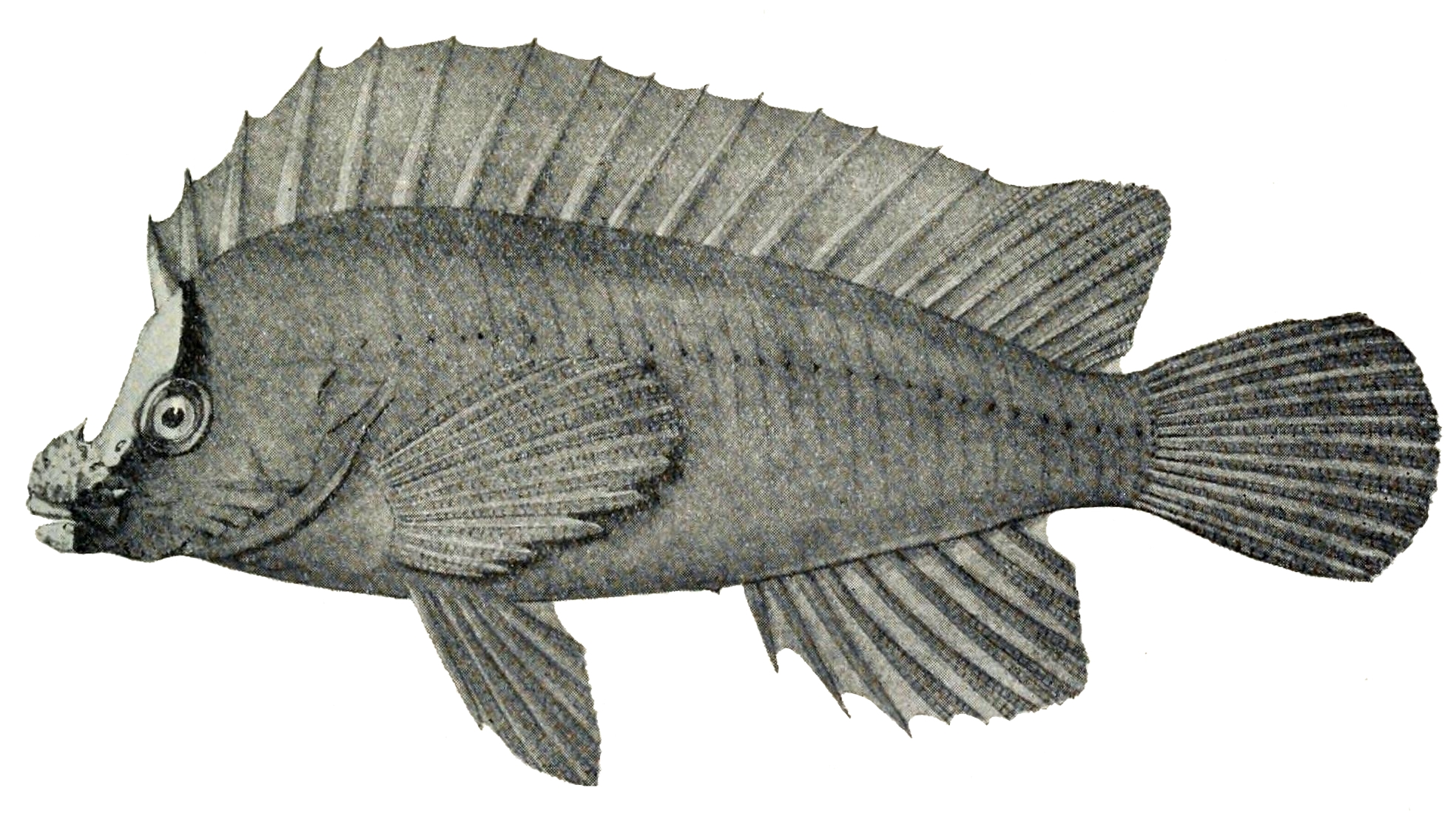

Scientific classification
- Kingdom: Animalia
- Phylum: Chordata
- Class: Actinopterygii
- Order: Perciformes
- Family: Synanceiidae
- Subfamily: Perryeninae; Honma, Imamura & Kawai, 2013
- Genus: Perryena; Whitley, 1940
- Species: P. leucometopon

Binomial name
- Perryena leucometopon (Waite, 1922)

Synonyms
- Congiopodus leucometopon Waite, 1922

= Whitenose pigfish =

Species of fish

The whitenose pigfish (Perryena leucometopon) is a species of marine ray-finned fish belonging to the family Congiopodidae, the horsefishes or pigfishes. It is endemic to the waters off southern and western Australia. It is the only species in the monotypic genus Perryena and the classification of that genus in the family Congiopodidae is not universally agreed upon.

== Taxonomy ==
The whitenose pigfish was first formally described in 1922 as Congiopodus leucometopon by the British-born Australian zoologist, ichthyologist, herpetologist, and ornithologist Edgar Ravenswood Waite with the type locality given as the beach at Glenelg on Gulf St Vincent in South Australia. In 1940 Gilbert Percy Whitley reclassified this species in the monotypic genus Perryena. A recent study placed the whitenose pigfish into an expanded stonefish clade, the Synanceiidae, because all of these fish have a lachrymal sabre that can project a switch-blade-like mechanism out from underneath their eye. Other classify it within the monogeneric family Perryenidae but the 5th edition of Fishes of the World retains this taxon within the family Congiopodidae. However, Eschmeyer's Catalog of Fishes (2025) treats it as a member of Synanceiidae.

== Etymology ==
The whitenose pigfish was given the specific name leucometopon by Waite, this is a compound of leuco, which means, "white" and metopon, meaning "forehead", an allusion to the white patch at the anterior part of the head. The genus name of Perryena was coined by Whitley and honours George Perry, the English naturalist who originally named the genus Congiopodus, which Waite had originally classified this species in.

== Description ==
The whitenose pigfish has a dorsal fin which starts over the centre of the eye and which contains 15 spines, with the fourth spine being the longest, and 9 soft rays. Unlike the species in the genus Congiopodus there are 3 spines, as opposed to none, in the anal fin and 6 or 7 soft rays. There are no scales on the skin. The forehead, first dorsal-fin spine, the anterior part of the snout and the tip of the chin are white, separated from the dark brown remainder of the head and body by a black stripe. This is a small species in which the type specimens were 160 mm (6.3 in) and 130 cm (51 in) in length.

== Distribution and habitat ==
The whitenose pigfish is endemic to southern and western Australia where there have been scattered records from the central coast of South Australia and off the southern and western coasts of Western Australia as far north as Port Denison. It is a reef associated, benthic species found on the continental shelf.
