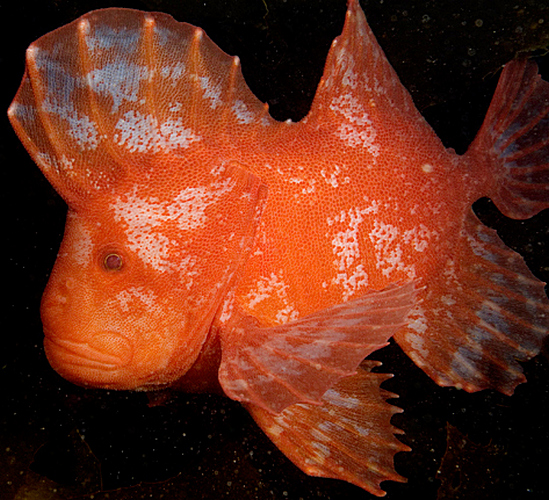

Scientific classification
- Kingdom: Animalia
- Phylum: Chordata
- Class: Actinopterygii
- Order: Perciformes
- Family: Synanceiidae
- Subfamily: Gnathanacanthinae; T. N. Gill, 1893
- Genus: Gnathanacanthus; Bleeker, 1855
- Species: G. goetzeei

Binomial name
- Gnathanacanthus goetzeei Bleeker, 1855

Synonyms
- Holoxenus cutaneus Günther, 1876; Beridia flava Castelnau, 1878; Holoxenus guentheri Johnston, 1883

= Red velvetfish =

Species of fish found in Australia

The red velvetfish (Gnathanacanthus goetzeei) is a species of marine ray-finned fish, it is the only species in the monotypic genus Gnathanacanthus and monogeneric subfamily Gnathanacanthinae. This species is endemic to the inshore waters of western and southern Australia.

== Taxonomy ==
The red velvetfish was first formally described in 1855 by the Dutch physician, herpetologist and ichthyologist Pieter Bleeker with the type locality given as the Derwent River near Hobart in Tasmania. Bleeker classified this new species in the monotypic genus Gnathanacanthus. and in 1893 Theodore Gill classified that genus within the monogeneric family Gnathanacanthidae, The 5th edition of Fishes of the World classifies the family within the suborder Scorpaenoidei which in turn is classified within the order Scorpaeniformes. Other authorities place the Scorpaenoidei within the Perciformes. A recent study placed the genus Gnathanacanthus into an expanded stonefish clade, the Synanceiidae, because all of these fish have a lachrymal sabre that can project a switch-blade-like mechanism out from underneath their eye.Eschmeyer's Catalog of Fishes presently recognizes this placement.

The name of the genus and family combine gnathus, meaning, "jaw", ana, meaning "not" and acanthus, meaning "thorn" or "spine", thought to refer to the lack of spines on the head, particularly in comparison to the Scorpaenid Taenianotus which was thought to be a close relative when Bleeker described this taxon. The specific name honours J. W. Goetzee who sent Bleeker specimens of fishes from Hobart, including the holotype of this species.

== Description ==
The red velvetfish has a highly compressed body that lacks scales but has a covering of papillae which give the skin a texture like velvet. The fins are large and rounded, the dorsal fin is divided into two with the spines in the first dorsal fin bearing venom. The dorsal fins contain 12 or 13 spines and 9 or 10 soft rays while the anal fin has 3 spines and between 8 and 10 soft rays. The pelvic fins sit beneath the pectoral fins. They have reached a maximum length of 46 cm (18 in). They are typically red yellow or orange with some mottling while the juveniles are translucent with red stripes, spots and ocelli.

== Distribution and habitat ==
The red velvetfish is endemic to temperate seas off southern Australia. It is found from in the vicinity of Lake Tyers in Victoria west to Point Moore, near Geraldton, Western Australia, it also occurs off the northern and eastern coasts of Tasmania and around the islands in the Bass Strait. They are found within kelp and other seaweeds on protected rock reefs, frequently living deep within caves and crevices at depths down to 55 m (180 ft).

== Biology ==
Red velvetfish sway back and forth with the swell in a similar manner to the kelp fronds they live among, enhancing their camouflage and making the difficult to detect. The predominantly red colour is dull in the absence of red light at the depths these fishes live in, further enhancing their camouflage. They are nocturnal ambush predators feeding largely on crustaceans and cephalopods, as well as smaller fishes. In humans invenomation by the red velvetfish is documented as causing excruciating pain with a duration of many hours.

== Cultural depiction ==
The red velvetfish has been depicted on an Australian postage stamp of 1985.
