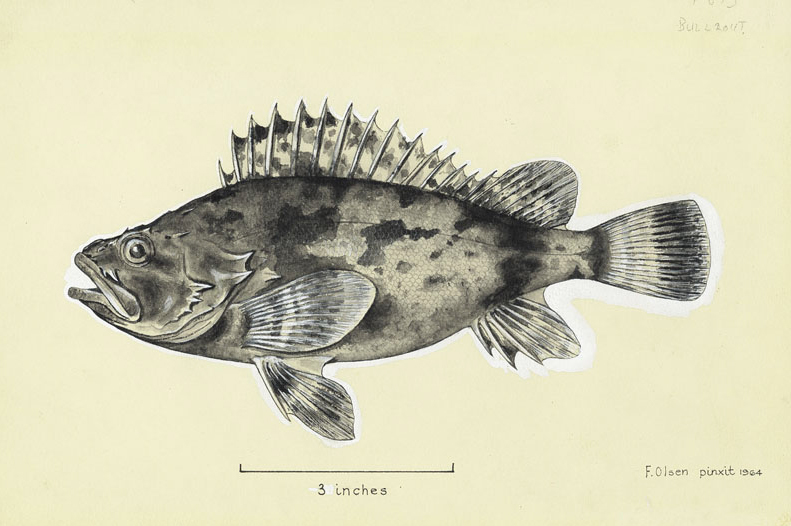
- Illustration of a Bullrout, Notesthes robusta, for Grant (1965) Guide to Fishes, p.229

Conservation status
- Least Concern (IUCN 3.1)

Scientific classification
- Kingdom: Animalia
- Phylum: Chordata
- Class: Actinopterygii
- Order: Perciformes
- Family: Synanceiidae
- Subfamily: Tetraroginae
- Genus: Notesthes; J. D. Ogilby, 1903
- Species: N. robusta

Binomial name
- Notesthes robusta (Günther, 1860)

Synonyms
- Centropogon robustus Günther, 1860

= Bullrout =

Species of fish

The bullrout (Notesthes robusta), also commonly called freshwater stonefish or kroki, is a pale yellowish to dark-brown coloured fish that lives in tidal estuaries and slow-flowing streams in eastern Australia, from southern New South Wales to northern Queensland. It has on a very infrequent occurrence been caught at sea. Its spines are venomous. It is the only member of the genus Notesthes. It is often confused with the true stonefish.

== Taxonomy and etymology ==
The bullrout was first formally described in 1860 as Centropogon robustus by the German-born British herpetologist and ichthyologist Albert Günther with its type locality given as New South Wales. The genus Notesthes was described in 1903 by the Australian ichthyologist James Douglas Ogilby as a monotypic genus for the bullrout. This taxon is included in the subfamily Tetraroginae within the Scorpaenidae in the 5th edition of Fishes of the World however other authorities place that subfamily within the stonefish family Synanceiidae, while other authorities classify this subfamily as a family in its own right.

The genus name Netesthes combines notos, which means back, and esthes, meaning "a garment", an allusion to the completely scaled back of this taxon. The specific name robusta means "stout" or "full-bodies", an allusion Günther did not explain but which may be due to its more robust body shape when compared to what was thought to be the closely related Eastern fortescue (Centropogon australis).

== Description ==
The bullrout is big headed with bony ridges, a large mouth and a lower jaw which protrudes beyond the upper jaw. There are 7 spines on the operculum. There are 15 robust spines in the dorsal fin and this part of dorsal fin is slightly concave towards the rear with the rearmost soft ray in the dorsal fin being attached to the caudal peduncle by a membrane. The head has no scales but the body is clothed in small scales. The overall colour is pale yellowish to dark brown broken by dark reddish-brown to greyish or black irregular mottling which can coalesce to create irregular bands. The maximum recorded standard length is 30 cm (12 in), although a standard length of 20 cm (7.9 in) is more typical.

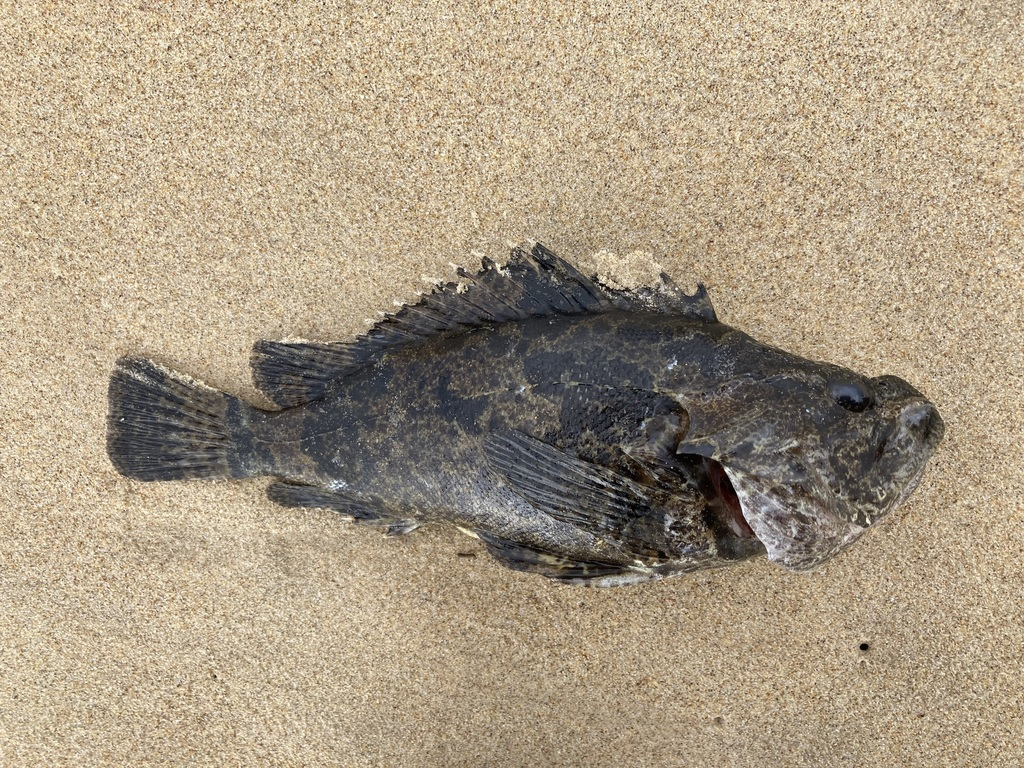
North Haven NSW

== Distribution and habitat ==
The bullrout is endemic to eastern Australia where it occurs from north of Cooktown, Queensland south to Pambula, southern New South Wales. This fish lives in the lower freshwater stretches of rivers and streams, as well as in bays and estuaries. It is typically encountered within aquatic vegetation or woody debris in still or slow flowing freshwaters where there are rocky, muddy or gravel substrates.

== Biology ==
The bullrout is a rather sedentary species in which individuals spend most of the time lying in wait on the bottom or among weeds for prey to pass, it is an ambush predator feeding on fishes and small crustaceans. They are known to migrate downstream in rivers during periods of heavy rainfall. They breed in freshwater and juveniles have been recorded from the upper reaches of rivers, upstream from barriers.

== Danger to humans and first aid ==
The dorsal, anal, and pelvic spines on a bullrout all contain venom glands. Stings from this animal are reportedly extremely painful but non-lethal. The pain may be treated by applying heat, which denatures the proteins in the venom. Local anaesthetics and analgesics are also reported to be effective. There is some evidence that morphine may not be effective in treating the pain from these stings.
