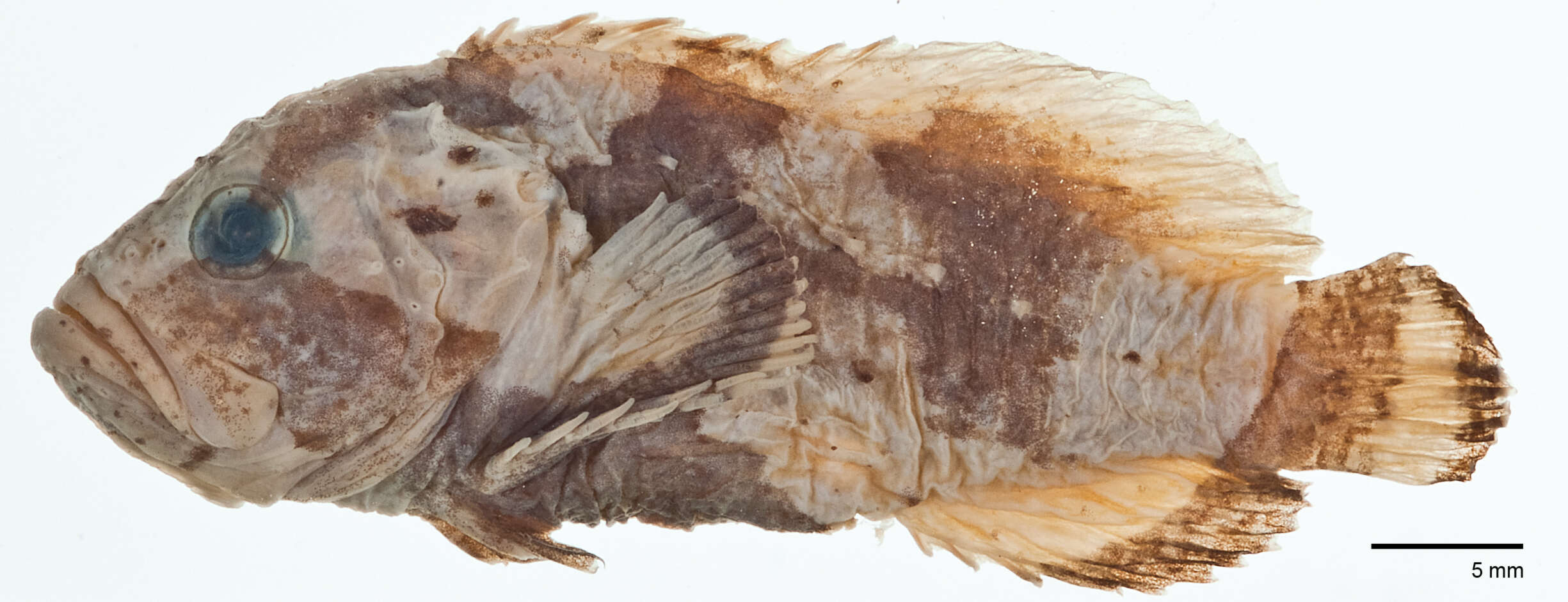

Scientific classification
- Kingdom: Animalia
- Phylum: Chordata
- Class: Actinopterygii
- Order: Perciformes
- Family: Synanceiidae
- Subfamily: Eschmeyerinae; Mandritsa, 2001
- Genus: Eschmeyer; Poss & V. G. Springer, 1983
- Species: E. nexus

Binomial name
- Eschmeyer nexus Poss & V. G. Springer, 1983

= Eschmeyer nexus =

Species of fish

Eschmeyer nexus, the cofish, is a species of marine ray-finned fish; it is the only species in the monotypic genus Eschmeyer and monogeneric subfamily Eschmeyerinae. This fish is only known from the Pacific Ocean, near Fiji.

== Taxonomy ==
Eschmeyer nexus was first formally described in 1983 by the American ichthyologists Stuart G. Poss and Victor G. Springer with the type locality given as Fiji. Poss and Springer placed their new species in the new monotypic genus Eschmeyer and in 2001 Sergey Anatolyevich Mandritsa classified that genus within the monogeneric family Eschmeyeridae, The 5th edition of Fishes of the World classifies the family within the suborder Scorpaenoidei which in turn is classified within the order Scorpaeniformes. Other authorities place the Scorpaenoidei within the Perciformes. A recent study placed the genus Eschmeyer into an expanded stonefish clade, the Synanceiidae, because all of these fish have a lachrymal sabre that can project a switch-blade-like mechanism out from underneath their eye. Eschmeyer's Catalog of Fishes presently recognizes this placement.

The name of both the genus and family honours William N. Eschmeyer, an American ichthyologist at the California Academy of Sciences, or his work on the Scorpaenid fishes. The specific name nexus, is derived from nectere, Latin for 'tie' or 'connect', a reference to the suite of features suggesting this taxon has a close relationship with a number of groups within the Scorpaenoidei. Mandritsa suggested the English common name of cofish in recognition of Eschmeyer’s participation in the Catalog of Fishes.

== Description ==
Eschmeyer nexus has eight spines and thirteen soft rays in the dorsal fin, with the first few dorsal fin spines being very short, while the anal fin has three spines and eight soft rays. All the fin rays are unbranched. The front part of the throat, the isthmus, does not have any fleshy papillae and the gill membranes do not have a wide junction with the isthmus. The frontal and parietal bones are well developed. There are no spines on the preorbital bone. The only scales are those on the lateral line which has ten tubed scales. There are no spiny projections to the rear of the caudal peduncle The pelvic fin membrane is joined to the body and is fused to the membrane of opposite pelvic fin. There is no detached pectoral fin ray. This is a small fish with a maximum standard length of 4.1 cm (1.6 in).

== Distribution and habitat ==
Eschmeyer nexus is found in the western central Pacific Ocean where it has only been recorded from Fiji. It is a demersal fish.
