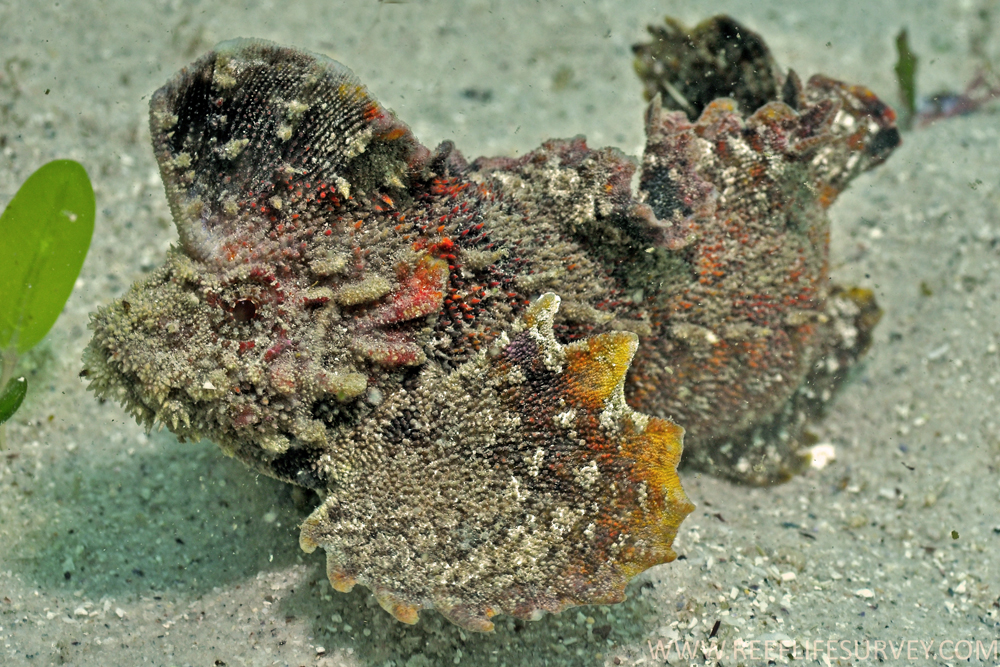
- Southern velvetfish (Aploactisoma milesii)
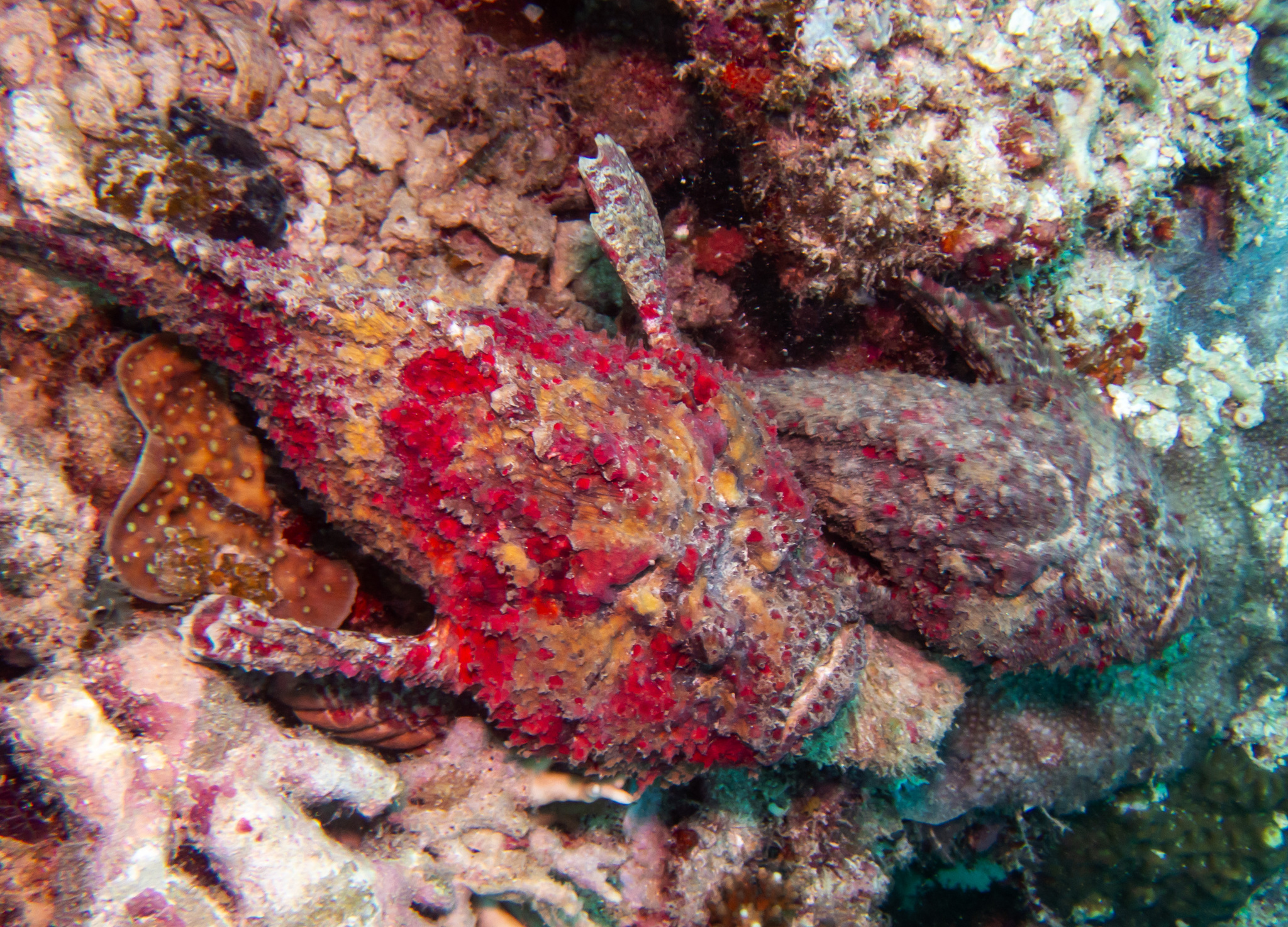
- Reef stonefish (Synanceia verrucosa)

Scientific classification
- Kingdom: Animalia
- Phylum: Chordata
- Class: Actinopterygii
- Division: Teleostei
- Order: Perciformes
- Suborder: Scorpaenoidei
- Family: Synanceiidae; Swainson, 1839

Genera
- See text

= Synanceiidae =

Synanceiidae Temporal range: Early Eocene–recent

Family of fishes

Synanceiidae, the stonefishes, are a family of ray-finned fishes in the order Perciformes, found in the Indo-Pacific region. They are close relatives of the scorpionfishes, with both placed in the suborder Scorpaenoidei. Many members of this family, most famously the subfamily Synanceiinae, are venomous. Most species in this family are marine, but some, such as Notesthes robusta, inhabit freshwater habitats.

All synanceiids share the unique defense mechanism of a "lachrymal saber", a switchblade-like spine found under each eye (being attached to the lachrymal bone) that can be projected forwards by movement of the maxilla.

== Taxonomy ==
Some members of this family, such as the unusual Gnathanacanthinae and Eschmeyerinae, were formerly treated as their own distinct families, while the Synanceiinae themselves were treated as a subfamily of the Scorpaenidae. However, phylogenetic evidence suggests that all these clades are closely related to one another, and Eschmeyer's Catalog of Fishes presently treats them as subfamilies of the family Synanceiidae.

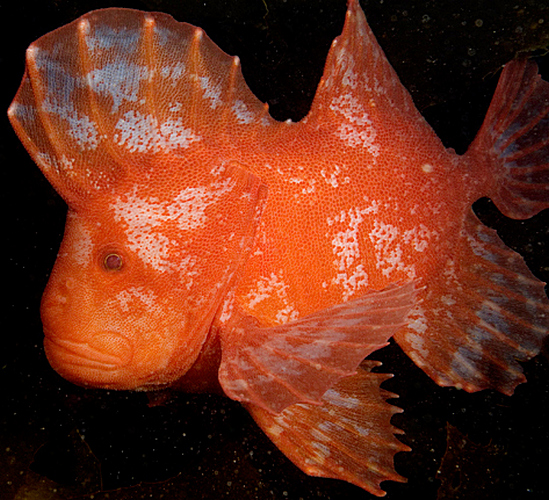
Red velvetfish (Gnathanacanthus goetzi)

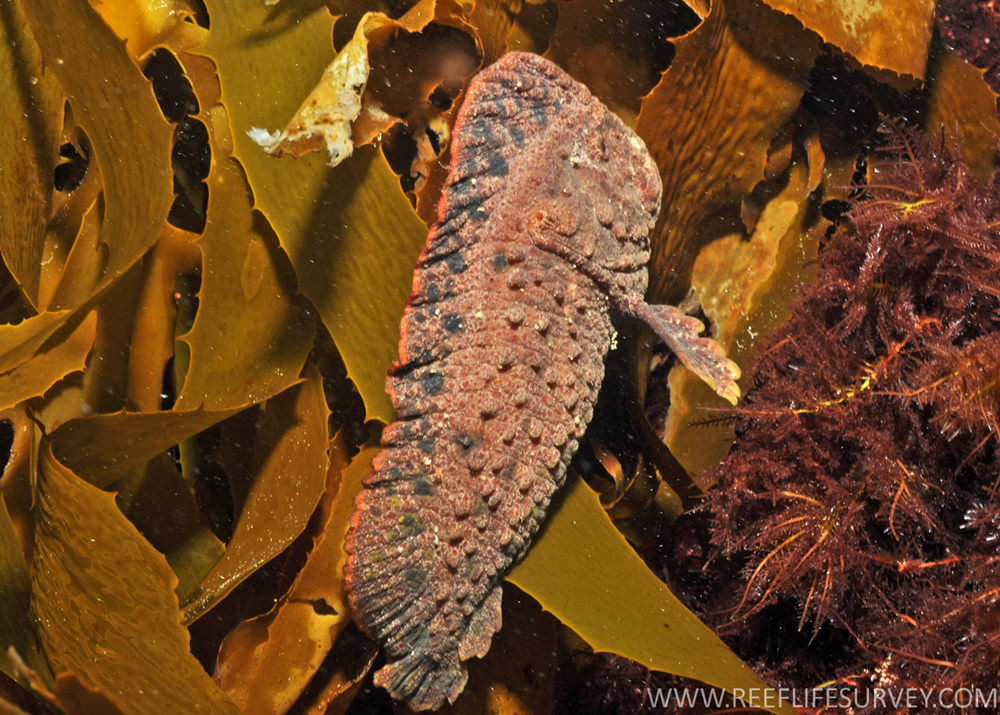
Warty prowfish (Aetapcus maculatus)

These genera are classified in this family, based on Eschmeyer's Catalog of Fishes:

- Family Synanceiidae
  - Genus †Eosynanceja Casier, 1946 (Early Eocene of Belgium)
  - Subfamily Apistinae Gill, 1859 (wasp scorpionfishes)
    - Genus Apistops Ogilby, 1911
    - Genus Apistus Cuvier, 1829
    - Genus Cheroscorpaena Mees, 1964
  - Subfamily Perryeninae Honma, Imamura & Kawai, 2013 (whitenose pigfishes)
    - Genus Perryena Whitley, 1940
  - Subfamily Eschmeyerinae Mandrytsa, 2001 (cofishes)
    - Genus Eschmeyer Poss & Springer, 1983
  - Subfamily Gnathanacanthinae Gill, 1892 (red velvetfishes)
    - Genus Gnathanacanthus Bleeker, 1855
  - Subfamily Aploactininae Jordan & Starks, 1904 (velvetfishes)
    - Genus Acanthosphex Fowler, 1938
    - Genus Adventor Whitley, 1952
    - Genus Aploactis Temminck & Schlegel, 1843
    - Genus Aploactisoma Castelnau, 1872
    - Genus Bathyaploactis Whitley, 1933
    - Genus Cocotropus Kaup, 1858
    - Genus Erisphex Jordan & Starks 1904
    - Genus Kanekonia Tanaka, 1915
    - Genus Matsubarichthys Poss & Johnson, 1991
    - Genus Neoaploactis Eschmeyer & Allen, 1978
    - Genus Paraploactis Bleeker, 1864
    - Genus Peristrominous Whitley, 1952
    - Genus Prosoproctus Poss & Eschmeyer, 1979
    - Genus Pseudopataecus Johnson, 2004
    - Genus Ptarmus J. L. B. Smith, 1947
    - Genus Sthenopus Richardson, 1848
    - Genus Xenaploactis Poss & Eschmeyer, 1980
  - Subfamily Pataecinae Gill, 1872 (prowfishes)
    - Genus Aetapcus E.O.G. Scott, 1936
    - Genus Neopataecus Steindachner, 1884
    - Genus Pataecus Richardson, 1844
  - Subfamily Tetraroginae Smith, 1949 (waspfishes)
    - Genus Ablabys Kaup, 1873
    - Genus Centropogon Gunther, 1860
    - Genus Coccotropsis Barnard, 1927
    - Genus Cottapistus Bleeker, 1876
    - Genus Glyptauchen Gunther, 1860
    - Genus Gymnapistes Swainson, 1839
    - Genus Liocranium Ogilby, 1903
    - Genus Neocentropogon Matsubara, 1943
    - Genus Neovespicula Mandrytsa, 2001
    - Genus Notesthes Ogilby, 1903
    - Genus Ocosia Jordan & Starks, 1904
    - Genus Paracentropogon Bleeker, 1876
    - Genus Pseudovespicula Mandrytsa, 2001
    - Genus Richardsonichthys J. L. B. Smith, 1958
    - Genus Snyderina Jordan & Starks, 1901
    - Genus Tetraroge Gunther, 1860
    - Genus Trichosomus Swainson, 1839 (=Vespicula Jordan & Richardson, 1910)
  - Subfamily Choridactylinae Kaup, 1859 (stingers)
    - Genus Choridactylus Richardson, 1848
    - Genus Inimicus Jordan & Starks, 1904
    - Genus Minous Cuvier, 1829
  - Subfamily Synanceiinae Swainson, 1839 (stonefishes)
    - Genus Dampierosa Whitley, 1932
    - Genus Erosa Swainson, 1839
    - Genus Leptosynanceia Bleeker, 1874
    - Genus Pseudosynanceia Day, 1875
    - Genus Synanceia Bloch & Schneider, 1801
    - Genus Trachicephalus Swainson, 1839
