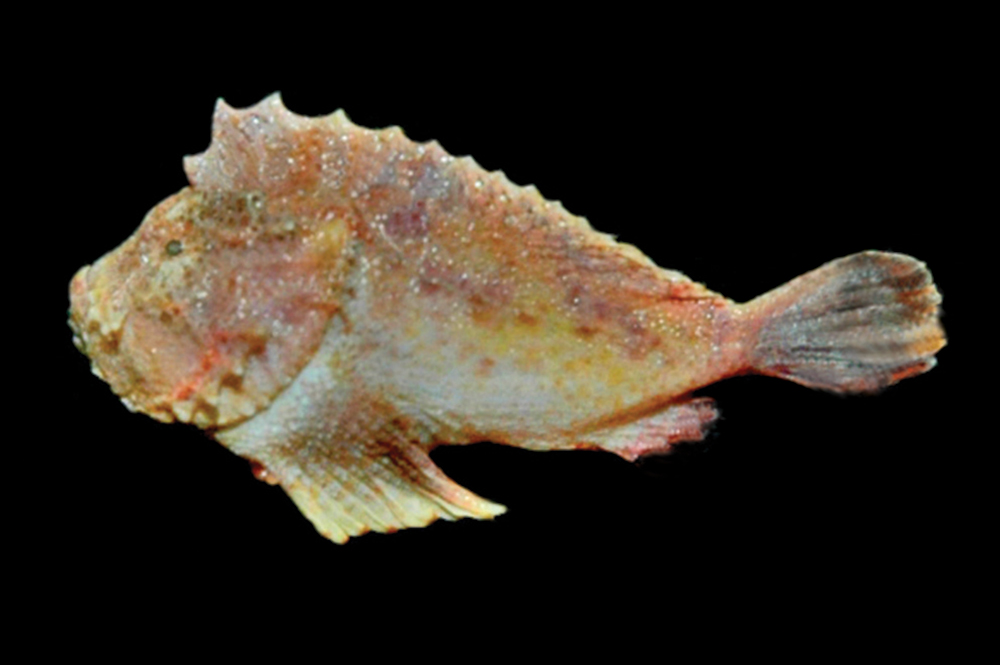
- Kanekonia queenslandica

Scientific classification
- Kingdom: Animalia
- Phylum: Chordata
- Class: Actinopterygii
- Order: Perciformes
- Family: Synanceiidae
- Subfamily: Aploactininae; Jordan & Starks, 1904

Genera
- see text

= Velvetfish =

Velvetfishes

Family of fishes

Little velvetfishes or simply Velvetfishes are a subfamily, the Aploactininae, of marine ray-finned fishes classified within the family Synanceiidae of the suborder Scorpaenoidei. They are small fish that have skin with a velvet texture. They live on the sea bottom close to the shore, at depths of up to 100 metres (330 ft). They are found in the Indo-Pacific region.

== Taxonomy ==
Aploactinidae was first formally recognised as a family by the American ichthyologists David Starr Jordan and Edwin Chapin Starks in 1904.The 5th edition of Fishes of the World classifies the family within the suborder Scorpaenoidei which in turn is classified within the order Scorpaeniformes. Other authorities place the Scorpaenoidei within the Perciformes. The most recent studies suggest that the velvetfishes belong to an expanded stonefish clade, the family Synanceiidae, because all of these fish have a curved sabre-like lacrimal spine that can project, using a switch-blade-like mechanism, out from underneath their eye. Eschmeyer's Catalog of Fishes presently recognizes this placement.

The name of the family is taken from that of the type genus, Aploactis. which is a compound of "haplo" meaning "single" or "simple", and actis, meaning "ray", presumed to refer to the simple, unbranched soft rays of the fins.

== Genera ==
The following genera are classified within the family Aploactinidae:

- Acanthosphex Fowler, 1938
- Adventor Whitley, 1952
- Aploactis Temminck & Schlegel, 1843
- Aploactisoma Castelnau, 1872
- Bathyaploactis Whitley, 1933
- Cocotropus Kaup, 1858
- Erisphex Jordan & Starks 1904
- Kanekonia Tanaka, 1915
- Matsubarichthys Poss & Johnson, 1991
- Neoaploactis Eschmeyer & Allen, 1978
- Paraploactis Bleeker, 1864
- Peristrominous Whitley, 1952
- Prosoproctus Poss & Eschmeyer, 1979
- Pseudopataecus Johnson, 2004
- Ptarmus J. L. B. Smith, 1947
- Sthenopus Richardson, 1848
- Xenaploactis Poss & Eschmeyer, 1980

== Characteristics ==
Velvetfishes get their name from the modified, prickly scales which cover the body and give the fish a velvety appearance, although there are some species which do not have these modified scales and have smooth skin, They typically have knobby lumps on the head, although sometimes there may be sharp spines. All of the fin rays are unbranched and the spines in the anal fin are normally weakly developed and blunt. The dorsal fin has its origin over or nearly above the eye. The first 3 to 5 dorsal fin spines may be separate, from the rest of the dorsal fin and can be raised or have almost no membrane between them. These separate spines form a separate fin in 4 species. The pelvic fin has a single spine and 2 or 3 soft rays, the pectoral fins are very large. In most species there is a fleshy extension on the anterior isthmus. There are no teeth on the palatines and no gill slit to the rear of last gill arch. One species, Prosoproctus pataecus, from the South China Sea, uniquely among scorpaenoids has its anus very far forward, just to the rear of the base of the pelvic fins. These are small fishes with the largest species being the roughskin scorpionfish (Cocotropus monacanthus) which has a maximum published total length of 13.1 cm (5.2 in).

== Distribution and habitat ==
Velvetfishes are found mainly in the eastern Indian and western Pacific Oceans, but some species are found in the eastern Indian Ocean. The adults are found among vegetation or over rocky, shelly, coral rubble or coralline algae substrates.

== Biology ==
Velvetfishes are uncommon and little is known about them. These fishes are very well camouflaged ambush predators hiding amongst algae or rubble on or in the vicinity of rocky and coral reefs. Their spines are venomous. Little is known about their spawning behavior but they do have pelagic larvae, the large pectoral fins develop early as an adaptation to their pelagic mode of life.
