= Dusky velvetfish =

Scientific classification
- Kingdom: Animalia
- Phylum: Chordata
- Class: Actinopterygii
- Order: Perciformes
- Family: Synanceiidae
- Genus: Aploactis; Temminck & Schlegel, 1843
- Species: A. aspera

Binomial name
- Aploactis aspera (J. Richardson, 1845)

Synonyms
- Synanceia aspera Richardson, 1845

Species of fish

The dusky velvetfish (Aploactis aspera) is a species of marine ray-finned fish, a velvetfish belonging to the family Aploactinidae. It is the only member of the monotypic genus Aploactis. This species is found in the western Pacific Ocean.

== Taxonomy ==
The dusky velvetfish was first formally described in 1843 as Synanceia aspera by the Scottish naval surgeon, Arctic explorer and naturalist John Richardson with the type locality given as "Seas of Japan", the type being collected during the voyage of HMS Sulphur. In 1843 Temminck and Schlegel had described a new subgenus of the stonefish genus Synanceia, Aploactis, and Richardson had named his new species this subgenus. Subsequently, only the dusky velvetfish was retained within Aploactis and this was eventually recognised as a valid genus and Richardson had designated S. aspera as its type species in 1844. This taxon is classified within the family Aploactinidae in the suborder Scorpaenoidei within the order Scorpaeniformes, although this family is also treated as a subfamily of the stonefish family Synanceiidae within the Scorpaenoidei, which in turn is treated as a superfamily within the order Perciformes. The name of the genus, Aploactis is a compound of "haplo" meaning "single" or "simple", and actis, meaning "ray", presumed to refer to the simple, unbranched soft rays of the fins. the specific name aspera means "rough", an allusion to the velvety prickles in the ody of this fish.

== Description ==
The dusky velvetfish has an elongate, compressed body. There are 2 blunt lacrimal spines, 5 preopercular spines with the smallest being the lowest. It has vomerine teeth. The origin of the dorsal fin origin is over the rear margin of the eye. The head and body are covered with prickles which are under the skin. The colour of the body is light brown to dark brown marked with small white and dark spots. There are 13 or 14 spines and 11 to 15 soft rays in the dorsal fin and a single spine and between 11 and 14 soft rays in the anal fin. The maximum published total length for the dusky velvetfish is 10 cm (3.9 in).

== Distribution and habitat ==
The dusky velvetfish is found in the Western Pacific Ocean and the Eastern Indian Ocean where it has been recorded from Japan, China, New Caledonia and Australia, In Australia it is found from Shark Bay to Rowlet Shoals in Western Australia and from Cape York in Queensland to Sydney in New South Wales. The demersal species is found in inshore waters of the continental shelf on sandy or mud bottoms in shallow waters.
