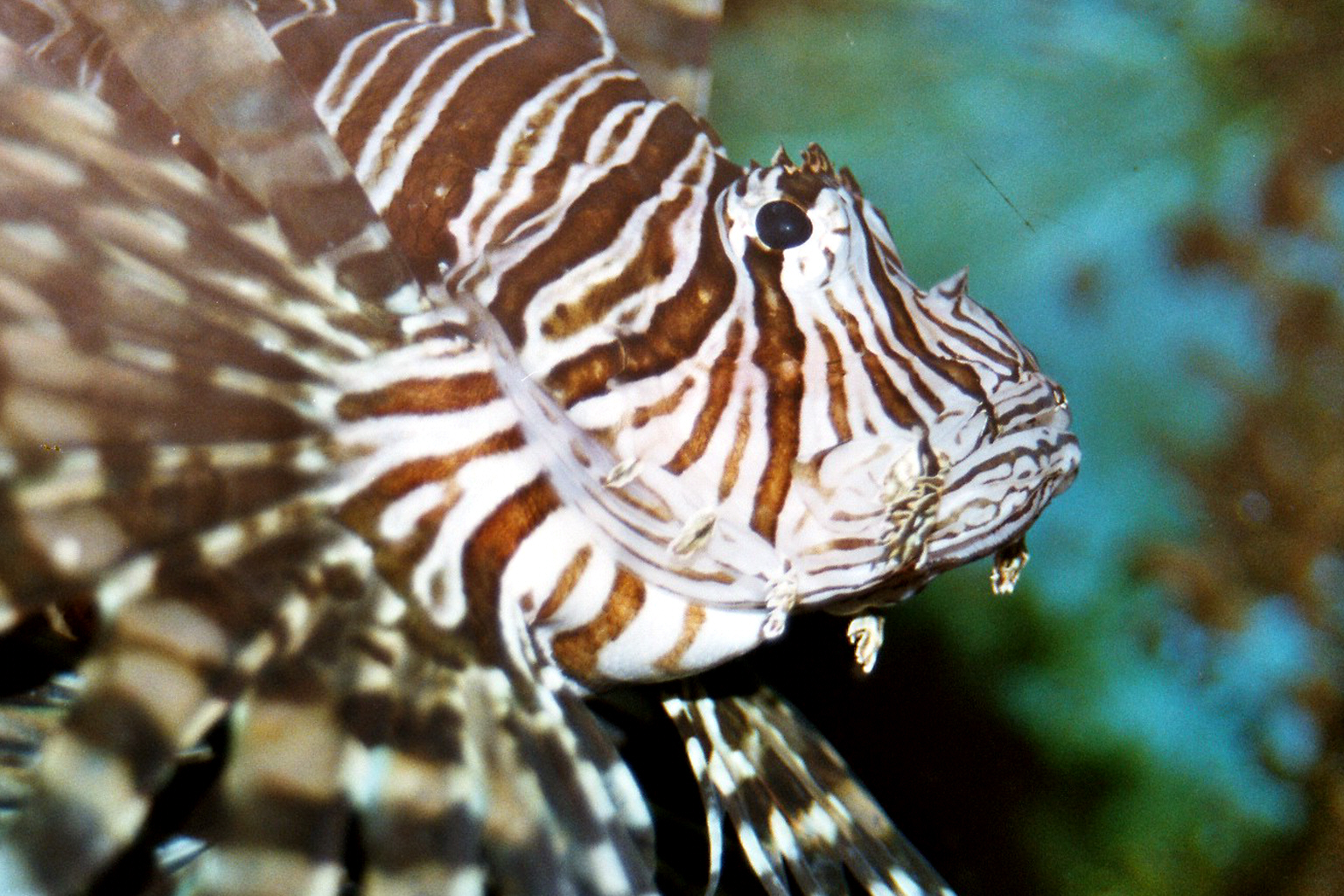
- Scorpaenidae: Pterois antennata

Scientific classification
- Kingdom: Animalia
- Phylum: Chordata
- Class: Actinopterygii
- Superorder: Acanthopterygii
- Order: Scorpaeniformes; Greenwood et al., 1966

Type species
- Scorpaena porcus Linnaeus, 1758

Suborders
- see text

= Scorpaeniformes =

Obsolete order of ray-finned fishes

The Scorpaeniformes /skɔːrˈpiːnɪfɔːrmiːz/ are a diverse order of ray-finned fish, encompassing species such as the stonefish, lionfish, and sculpins, but have also been called the Scleroparei. It is one of the five largest orders of bony fishes by number of species, with over 1,320.

They are known as "mail-cheeked" fishes due to their distinguishing characteristic, the suborbital stay: a backwards extension of the third circumorbital bone (part of the lateral head/cheek skeleton, below the eye socket) across the cheek to the preoperculum, to which it is connected in most species.

Scorpaeniform fishes are carnivorous, mostly feeding on crustaceans and on smaller fish. Most species live on the sea bottom in relatively shallow waters, although species are known from deep water, from the midwater, and even from fresh water. They typically have spiny heads, and rounded pectoral and caudal fins. Most species are less than 30 cm (12 in) in length, but the full size range of the order varies from the velvetfishes belonging to the family Aploactinidae, which can be just 2 cm (0.79 in) long as adults, to the skilfish (Erilepis zonifer), which can reach 183 cm (6.00 ft) in total length.

One of the suborders of the Scorpaeniformes is the Scorpaenoidei. This suborder is usually found in the benthic zone, which is the lowest region of any water body like oceans or lakes.

There are two groups of the Scorpaenoidei. The sea robins is the first, which are further classified into two families: the sea robins and the armored sea robins. One significant difference between the two families of sea robins is the presence of spine-bearing plate on the armored sea robins which is absent in the sea robins family.

The second group of the Scorpaenoidei suborder is the scorpionfishes, which according to Minouri Ishida's work in 1994 and recent studies, have twelve families. The scorpionfishes are very dynamic in size with the smallest one having a range of 2–3 cm, while the largest have a length of approximately 100 cm.

== Classification ==
The division of Scorpaeniformes into families is not settled; accounts range from 26 to 35 families. The 5th edition of Fishes of the World classifies the order as follows:

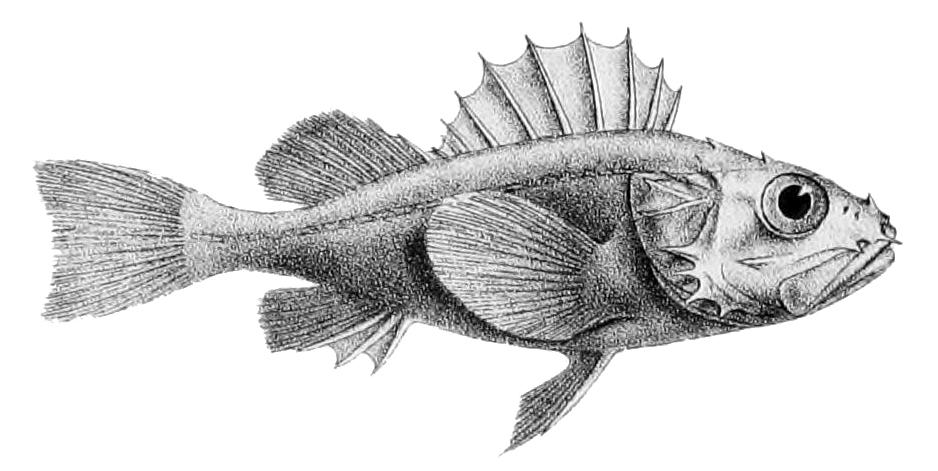
Setarchinae: Deepwater scorpionfish, Setarches guentheri

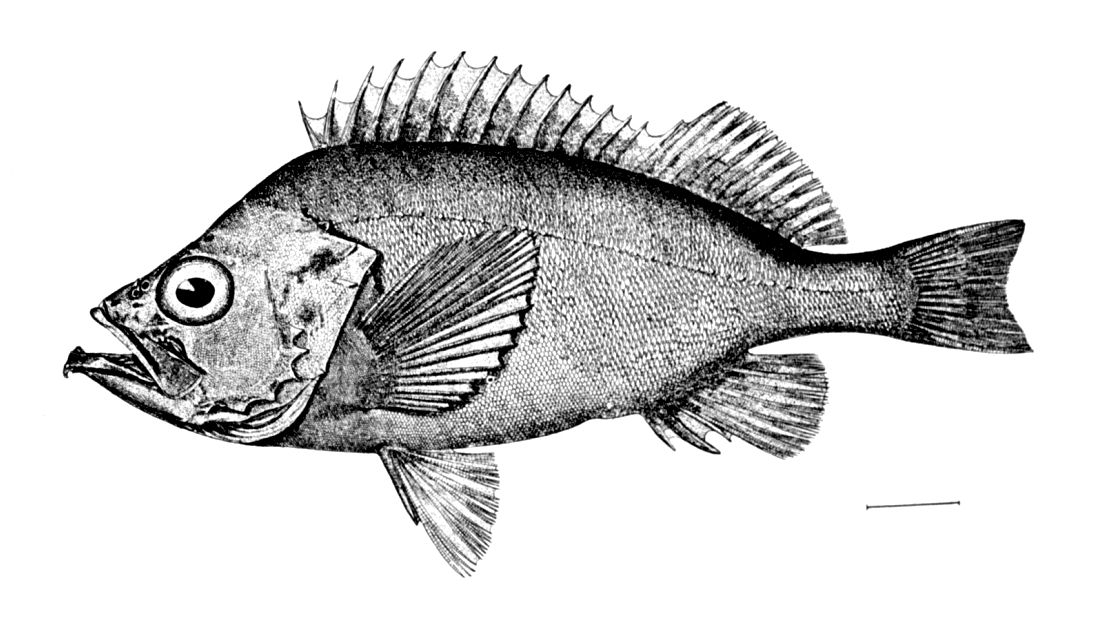
Sebastinae: Rose fish, Sebastes norvegicus

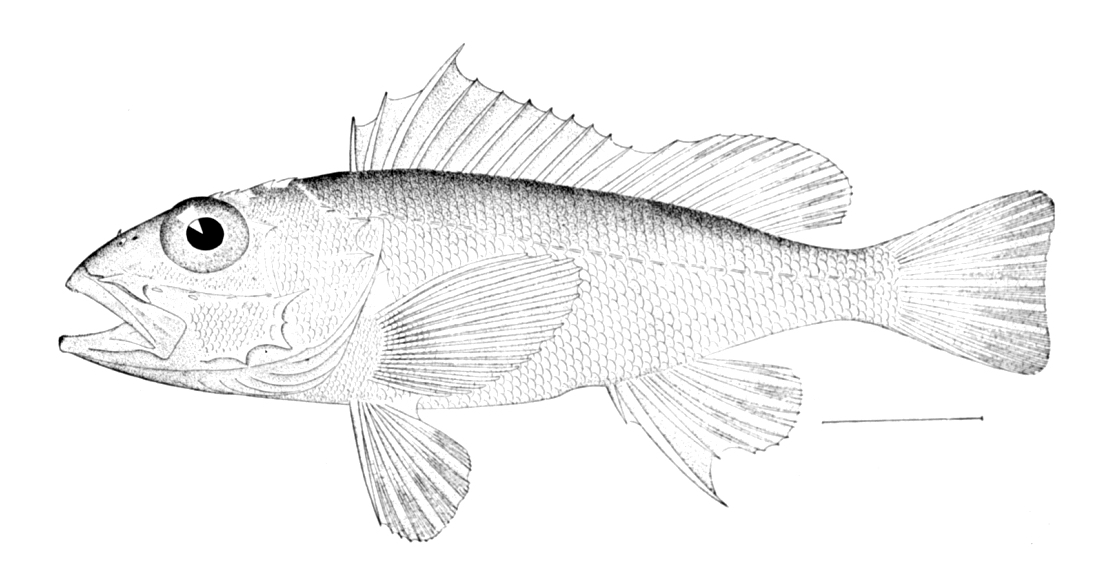
Scorpaenidae: Longspine scorpionfish, Pontinus longispinis

Order Scorpaeniformes

- Suborder Scorpaenoidei
  - Superfamily Congiopodoidea
    - Family Aploactinidae Jordan & Starks, 1904 (Velvetfishes)
    - Family Congiopodidae Gill, 1889 (Racehorses, pigfishes or horsefishes)
  - Superfamily Pataecoidea
    - Family Pataecidae Gill, 1872 (Australian prowfishes)
    - Family Gnathanacanthidae Gill, 1892 (Red velvetfish)
  - Superfamily Scorpaenoidea
    - Family Eschmeyeridae Mandrytsa, 2001 (the cofish)
    - Family Scorpaenidae Risso, 1827 (Scorpionfishes)
- Suborder Platycephaloidei
  - Superfamily Platycephaloidea
    - Family Bembridae Kaup, 1873 (Deepwater flatheads)
    - Family Platycephalidae Swainson, 1839 (True flatheads)
    - Family Hoplichthyidae Kaup, 1873 (Ghost flatheads)
  - Superfamily Trigloidea
    - Family Triglidae Rafinesque, 1815 (Common searobins)
    - Family Peristediidae Jordan & Gilbert, 1883 (Armored searobins)
- Suborder Normanichthyiodei
  - Family Normanichthyidae Clark, 1837 (the Barehead scorpionfish or mote sculpin)
- Suborder Zoarcoidei
  - Superfamily Anarhichadoidea
    - Family Anarhichadidae Bonaparte, 1835 (Wolffishes)
    - Family Cryptacanthodidae Gill, 1861 (Wrymouths)
    - Family Stichaeidae Gill, 1864 (Pricklebacks)
    - Family Pholidae Gill, 1893 (Gunnels)
  - Superfamily Bathymasteroidea
    - Family Bathymasteridae Jordan & Gilbert, 1883 (Ronquils)
    - Family Ptilichthyidae Jordan & Gilbert, 1883 (Quillfish)
  - Superfamily Zoarcoidea
    - Family Eulophiidae H. M. Smith, 1902 (Spinous eelpouts)
    - Family Zoarcidae Swainson, 1839 (True Eelpouts)
  - Superfamily Zaproroidea
    - Family Scytalinidae Jordan & Starks, 1895 (Graveldivers)
    - Family Zaproridae Jordan, 1896 (Prowfishes)
- Suborder Gasterosteoidei
  - Family Hypoptychidae Steindachner, 1880 (the Korean Sandlance)
  - Family Aulorhynchidae Gill (1861) (Tubesnouts)
  - Family Gasterosteidae Bonaparte, 1831 (Sticklebacks)
- Suborder Cottoidei
  - Superfamily Anoplopomatoidea (Quast, 1965)
    - Family Anoplopomatidae Jordan & Gilbert, 1883 (Blackcod)
  - Superfamily Zaniolepidoidea Shinohara, 1994
    - Family Zaniolepididae Jordan & Gilbert, 1883 (Combfishes)
  - Superfamily Hexagrammoidea Gill, 1889
    - Family Hexagrammidae Jordan, 1888 (Greenlings)
  - Superfamily Trichodontoidea Nazarkin & Voskoboinikova, 2000
    - Family Trichodontidae Bleeker, 1859 (Sandfishes)
  - Superfamily Cottoidea Gill, 1889
    - Family Jordaniidae Jordan & Evermann, 1898 (Longfin sculpins)
    - Family Rhamphocottidae Jordan & Gilbert, 1883 (Grunt sculpins)
    - Family Scorpaenichthyidae Jordan & Evermann, 1898
    - Family Agonidae Swainson, 1839 (Poachers and searavens)
    - Family Cottidae Bonaparte, 1831 (Sculpins)
    - Family Psychrolutidae Günther, 1861 (Bighead sculpins)
    - Family Bathylutichthyidae Balushkin & Voskoboinikova, 1990 (Antarctic sculpins)
  - Superfamily Cyclopteroidea Gill, 1873
    - Family Cyclopteridae Bonaparte, 1831 (lumpfishes or lumpsuckers)
    - Family Liparidae Gill, 1861 (Snailfishes)

This classification is not settled, however, and some authorities classify these groupings largely within the Order Perciformes as the suborders Scorpaenoidei, Platycephaloidei, Triglioidei and Cottoidei, Cottodei including the infraorders Anoplopomatales, Zoarcales, Gasterosteales, Zaniolepidoales, Hexagrammales and Cottales. These infraorders largely correspond with the superfamilies in the Cottoidei set out in the 5th edition of Fishes of the World.

== See also ==
- List of fish families
