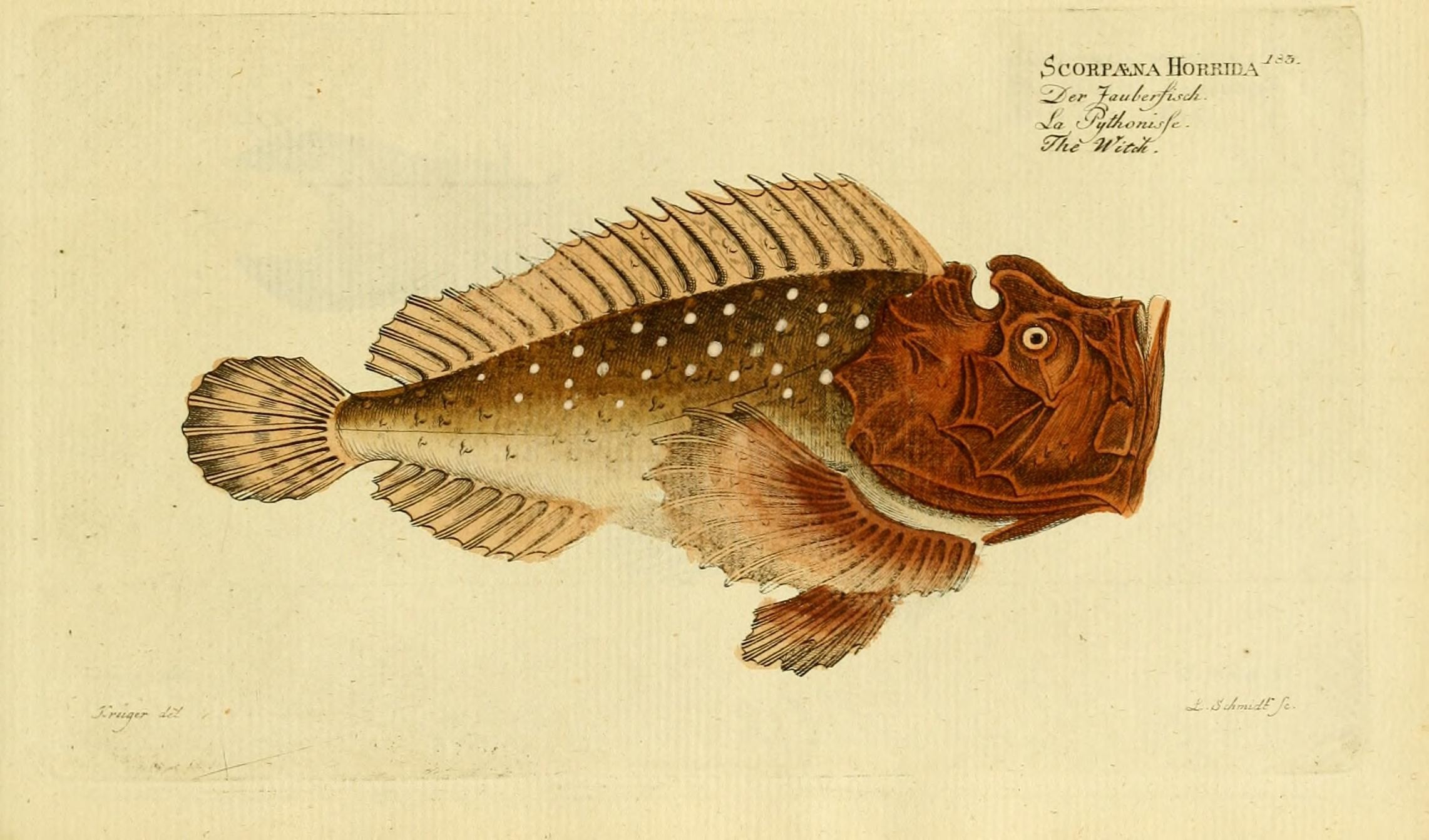
- Synanceia horrida, 1796 illustration

Scientific classification
- Kingdom: Animalia
- Phylum: Chordata
- Class: Actinopterygii
- Order: Perciformes
- Suborder: Scorpaenoidei
- Family: Synanceiidae
- Subfamily: Synanceiinae
- Genus: Synanceia; Bloch and J. G. Schneider, 1801

Type species
- Scorpaena brachion Linnaeus, 1766

Synonyms
- Barffianus Curtiss, 1944; Bufichthys Swainson, 1839; Deleastes Seale, 1906; Emmydrichthys Jordan & Rutter, 1896; Nofua Whitley, 1930; Phrynichthys Agassiz, 1846; Synanceichthys Bleeker, 1863; Synancidium Müller, 1843

= Synanceia =

Genus of venomous fishes

Synanceia is a genus of ray-finned fish belonging to the subfamily Synanceiinae, commonly known as the stonefish, which is classified within the family Scorpaenidae, the scorpionfish and close relatives. Stonefish are the most venomous fish known; stings can be fatal to humans. They are found in the coastal regions of the Indo-Pacific. They are sometimes confused with the freshwater lionfish.

== Taxonomy ==
Synanceia was first described as a genus in 1801 by the German naturalists Marcus Elieser Bloch and Johann Gottlob Theaenus Schneider with Scorpaena horrida, which had been described by Carl Linnaeus in 1766 from Ambon Island (Indonesia), as its type species. The genus Synanceia is classified within the tribe Synanceiini which is one of three tribes in the subfamily Synanceeinae within the family Scorpaenidae. Despite this, other authorities regard Synanceiidae as a valid family and the Synanceiini as the subfamily Synanceiinae. The genus name Synanceia is made up of syn 'with' and angeíon 'cavity', an allusion to the large, cavernous heads of the species considered to be in the genus.

=== Species ===
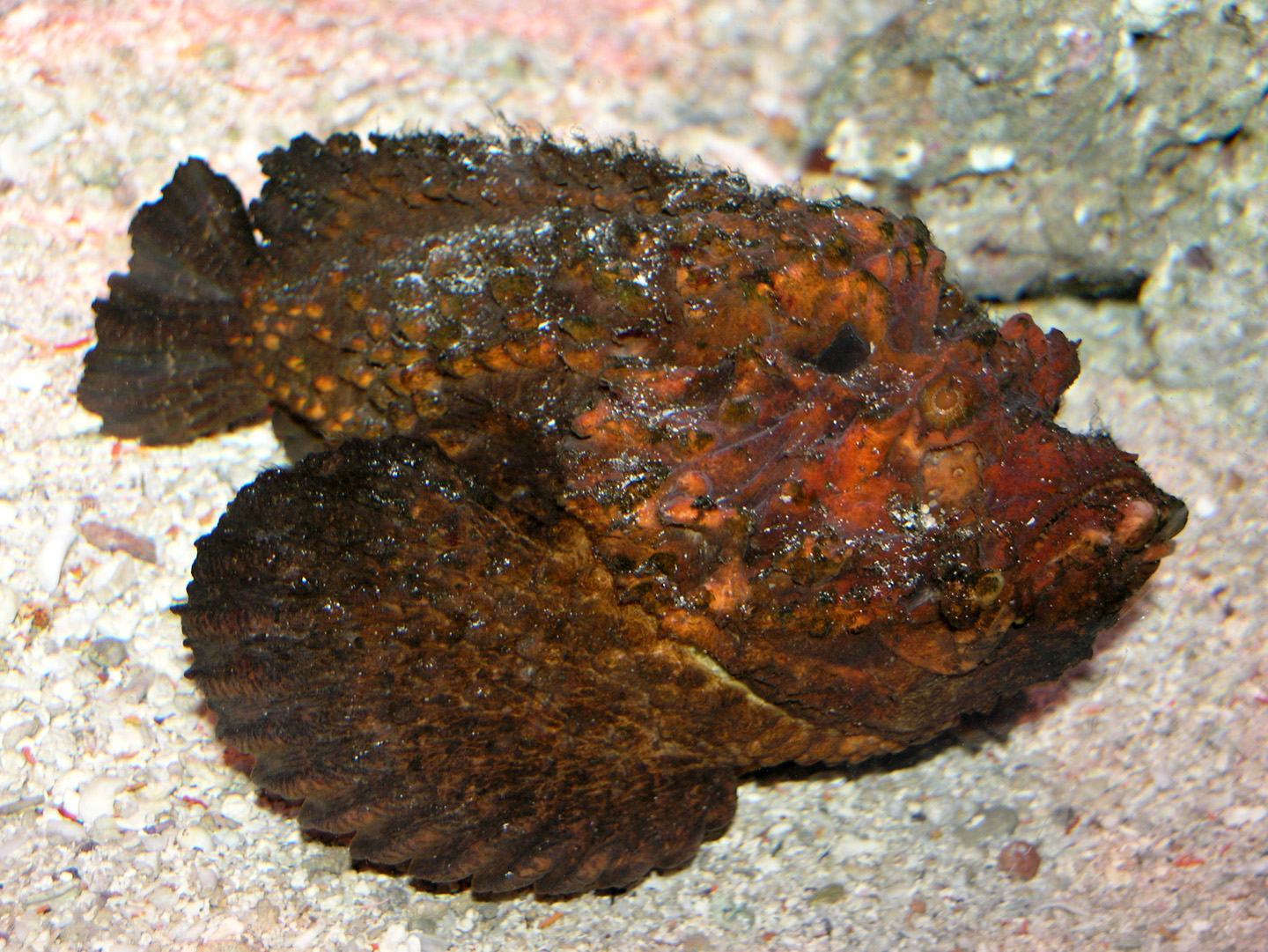
Synanceia verrucosa in a public aquarium

Synanceia contains the following species:

Image	Scientific name	Common name	Distribution
	Synanceia alula (Eschmeyer & Rama Rao, 1973)	Midget stonefish	northern Indian Ocean to the Solomon Islands
	Synanceia horrida (Linnaeus, 1766)	Estuarine stonefish	India to China, the Philippines, Papua New Guinea and Australia, and is also recorded in Vanuatu
	Synanceia nana (Eschmeyer & Rama Rao, 1973)	Red Sea stonefish	Red Sea and Persian Gulf
	Synanceia platyrhyncha (Bleeker, 1874)		Indonesia
	Synanceia verrucosa (Bloch and J. G. Schneider, 1801)	Reef stonefish	Red Sea and Indo-Pacific
	Synanceia quinque Matsunuma, Manjaji‑Matsumoto & Motomura, 2021		Indonesia

== Habitat and characteristics ==
Synanceia are primarily marine, and although some species are known to live in rivers, most live in coral reefs near the tropical Pacific and Indian oceans. The species has potent neurotoxins secreted from glands at the base of their needle-like dorsal fin spines which stick up when disturbed or threatened. The vernacular name of the species, the stonefish, derives from its grey and mottled camouflage similar to the color of a stone. Swimmers may not notice them and inadvertently step on them, triggering a sting. When the stonefish is disturbed, it may inject an amount of venom proportional to the amount of pressure applied to it. Stonefish have the ability to extend sharp, specialized spines (lachrymal saber) as an additional defense mechanism.

=== Venom ===
The venom of Synanceia consists of a proteinaceous toxin called verrucotoxin (VTX), which modulates Ca^{2+} channel activity through the β-adrenoceptor-cAMP-PKA pathway. In humans, stings can cause intense pain, respiratory weakness, damage to the cardiovascular system, convulsions and paralysis; sometimes they can lead to death. The exact mechanism is not yet fully understood.

== Treatment of envenomation ==
Stonefish stings are injuries which may include envenomation and mechanical trauma. They are extremely painful and potentially lethal. There are a number of species of venomous fish including the stonefish. The two most recommended treatments are the application of heat to the affected area and antivenom. Hot water (at a temperature of at least 45 °C (113 °F)) applied to the injured area has been found to denature stonefish venom, and causes minimal discomfort to the victim. Antivenom is used in more extreme cases. Vinegar is found on some Australian beaches as it is said to lessen the pain.

=== Stonefish stings in Australia ===
The stonefish is the most venomous known fish in the world and stings can cause death if not treated. Most stonefish stings occur as a result of stepping on the creature which forces venom into the foot, while it is less common for the fish to sting when it is picked up. Stonefish stings can occur on the beach, not just in the water, since stonefish can survive out of the water for up to 24 hours. They are not easily seen as they look similar to rocks or coral. Stonefish antivenom is the second-most administered in Australia.

Some Aboriginal Australians have corroborees which involve reenacting the death of someone who trod on the fish. The aboriginal people of Northern Australia and the Great Barrier Reef have ways of preparing the fish for eating to avoid poisoning.

After stonefish envenomation, the amount of anti-venom given depends on the number of puncture wounds from the stonefish spines.

=== Number of incidents ===
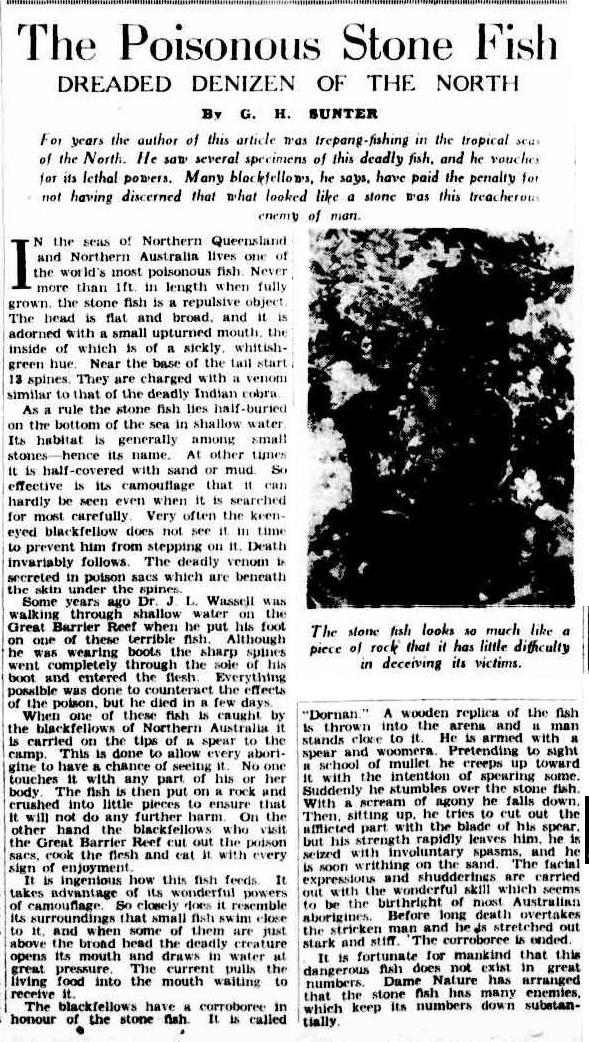
1936 article from Melbourne newspaper The Argus about venomous stonefish.

There were 25 cases of the use of antivenom for stonefish reported to Commonwealth Serum Laboratories for a one-year period between July 1989 and June 1990, with most from Queensland and four from the Northern Territory. There were 14 calls to the Queensland Poisons Information System in 2008 regarding stonefish poison.

=== Fatal incidents ===
Name	Age	Date	Location
Joseph Leathom Wassell	41	7 April 1915	Thursday Island, Australia
name not given	58	6 August 2010	Nago, Okinawa, Japan

== As food ==
Synanceia are edible to humans if properly prepared. The protein-based venom breaks down quickly when heated, and raw stonefish served as part of sashimi is rendered harmless simply by removing the dorsal fins, which are the main source of venom. The fish are considered a delicacy in many parts of Asia, including south Japan, south Fujian, Guangdong in China, Hong Kong and some parts of Vietnam. In the Hokkien-speaking area, they are considered delicacies and good for health. The meat of Synanceia is white, dense and sweet and the skin is edible. They are usually cooked with ginger into a clear soup and sometimes served raw as sashimi.
