= Taxonomy of Lophiodon =

Taxonomy of a fossil mammal genus

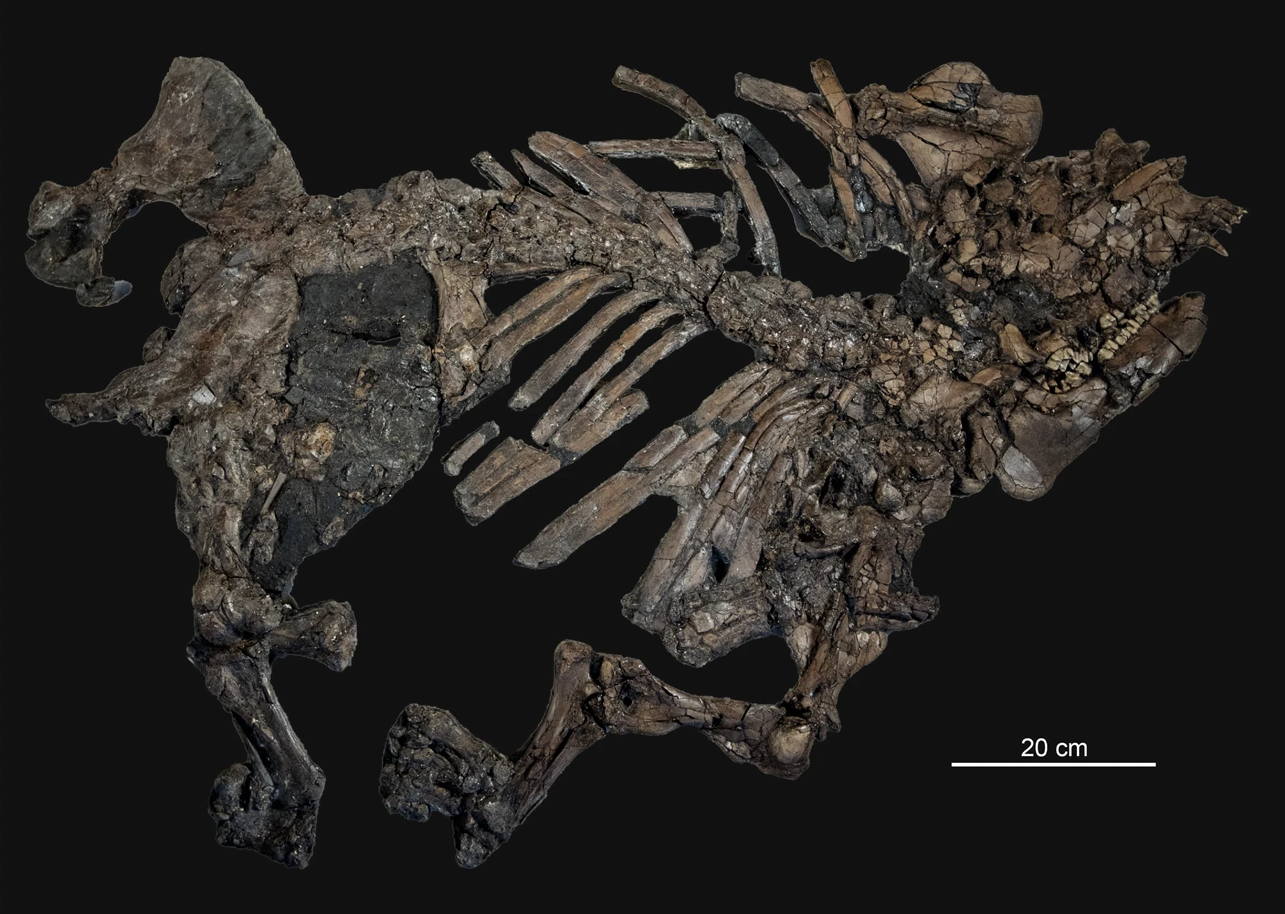
Skeleton of Lophiodon remensis from the Geiseltal fossil deposit

The fossil mammal genus Lophiodon has a complex taxonomic history, which records the likes of many valid species, synonymous species names, and species that were eventually reclassified to other mammal genera. Its taxonomic history dates back as early as 1804 when the French naturalist Georges Cuvier referred to some of its first studied fossils as belonging to tapirs before eventually being assigned to new species of Palaeotherium by him in 1812. Although first recognized as a distinct genus by French zoologist Henri Marie Ducrotay de Blainville, who gave it the name Tapirotherium, the name Lophiodon, deriving from the hill-like cusps somewhat like in tapirs, as given by Cuvier in 1822 became more widely used without its validity being overridden by the preexisting genus name at any point. Although Cuvier recognized many potential species of Lophiodon, later palaeontologists like the French zoologist Johann Baptist Fischer assigned them to formal species names.

Many species in Europe and North America were assigned to Lophiodon in the 19th century but were eventually classified to various other mammal genera like other members of the Lophiodontidae as well as to other members of the Perissodactyla and to Coryphodon. There are fourteen species presently assigned to Lophiodon in total, although L. glandicus remains not as well-defined while "L." sardus is pending revisions to another genus and is not considered to be a Paralophiodon species despite having been previously reassigned there.

== Early taxonomy ==
=== Cuvier's documentations and early taxonomy ===
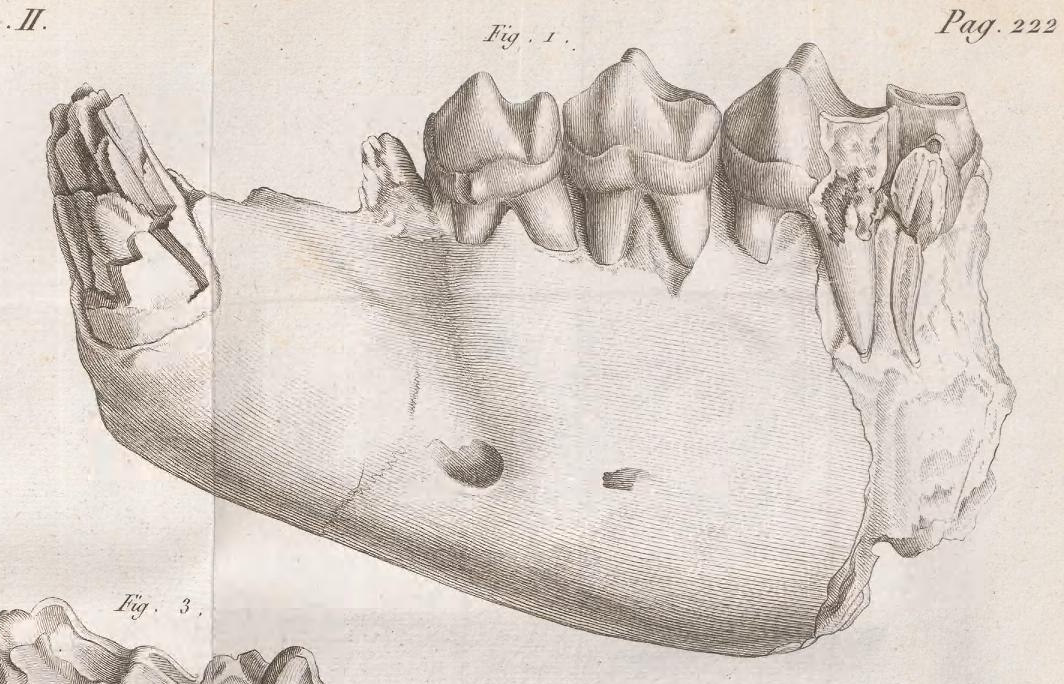
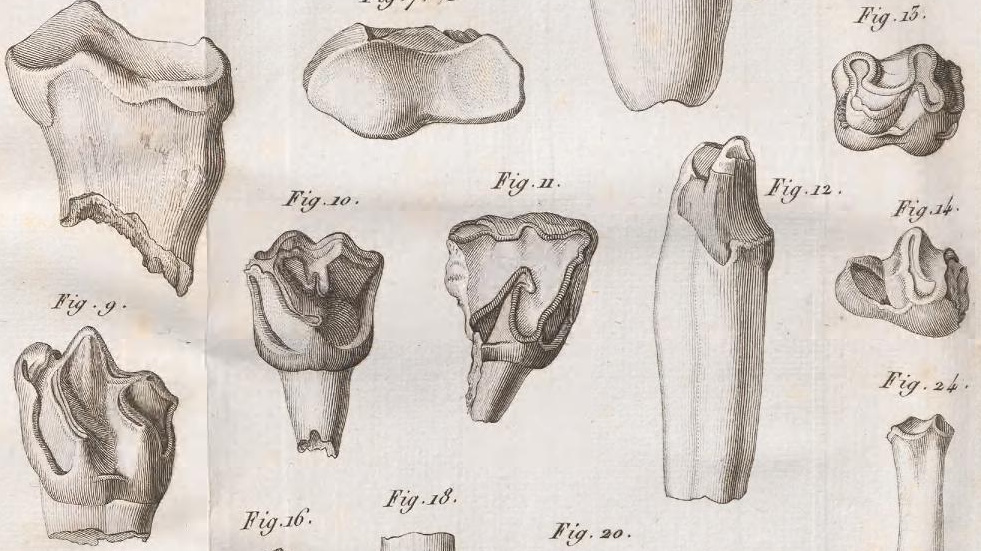
1822 illustrations of the lower jaw of Lophiodon tapiroides from Bouxwiller (left) and teeth of Lophiodon medium from Argenton-sur-Creuse (right)

Fossils of Lophiodon have first been studied in 1804 by the French palaeontologist Georges Cuvier, who originally referred to some of them as belonging to a small-sized tapir (with some close relatives also being studied by him before 1822). In 1812, he erected within the extinct genus Palaeotherium the species P. giganteum, P. tapiroïdes, P. buxovillanum, and P. occitanicum, describing them as being the size of rhinoceroses, oxes, pigs, and sheep, respectively. As early as 1817, French zoologist Henri Marie Ducrotay de Blainville suggested that some species classified to Palaeotherium by Cuvier like P. tapiroïdes should be classified under the new genus Tapirotherium. He suggested that it would have been intermediate in morphology between Tapirus and Palaeotherium. He said that he did not know of any upper jaw belonging to Tapirotherium but suggested that it would be similar to that of Palaeotherium. He noted a lower half of a jaw from a collection belonging to an individual named Mr. de Drée, which he said contained three incisors, a strong canine, and six molars, the last three of the latter of which he said were similar to those of tapirs and Palaeotherium.

In 1822, Cuvier dedicated an entire chapter to "tapir-like" mammal fossils found in various European localities. In the chapter's first section, he described various tapir-like teeth from several localities that he did not assign any name to and referenced several other localities that he would then describe in the next section. Among them were dental material from the French city of Orléans that he assigned to the informal name "tapir gigantesques", or "gigantic tapirs." In the second section, Cuvier erected the genus name Lophiodon, stating that its name references the transverse hill-like cusps of the molars like in modern tapirs. He also stated that like tapirs, Lophiodon had six incisors and two canines on each side of its mouth (or three incisors and one canine in each jaw's side). Cuvier argued that it differed from tapirs in having more oblique cusps in each molar, there being one rather than two cusps in each of the first molars, and the bases of the molars being less rectangular (especially the last ones). Furthermore, he said that some species of Lophiodon had different tooth morphologies more reminiscent of hyraxes and rhinoceroses and thus form a diverse range of forms by species like Palaeotherium. The genus name Lophiodon means "crested tooth", which is a compound of the Greek prefix λόφος ('lóphos') meaning 'crest' and the suffix ὀδούς ('odoús') meaning 'tooth'.

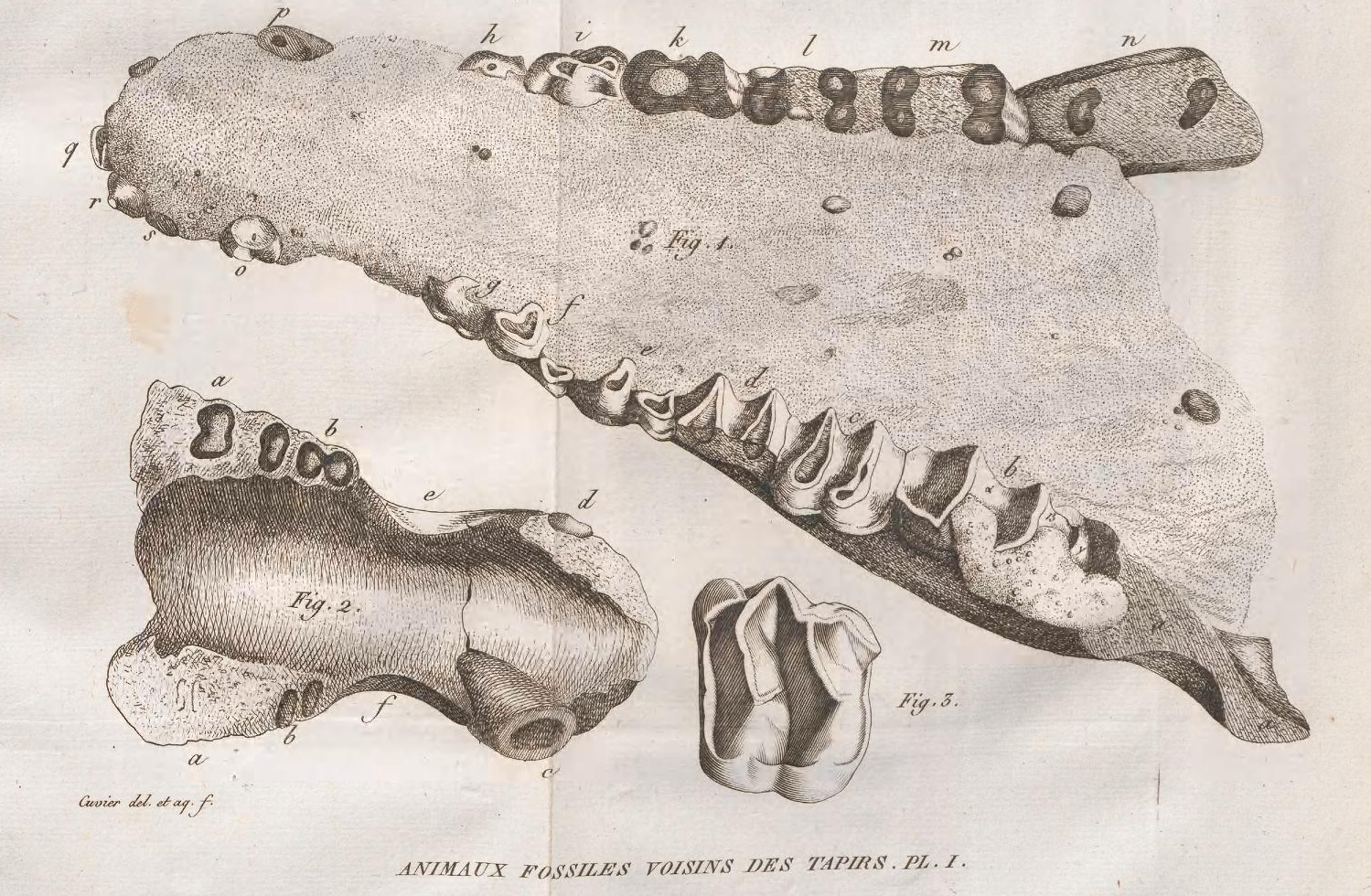
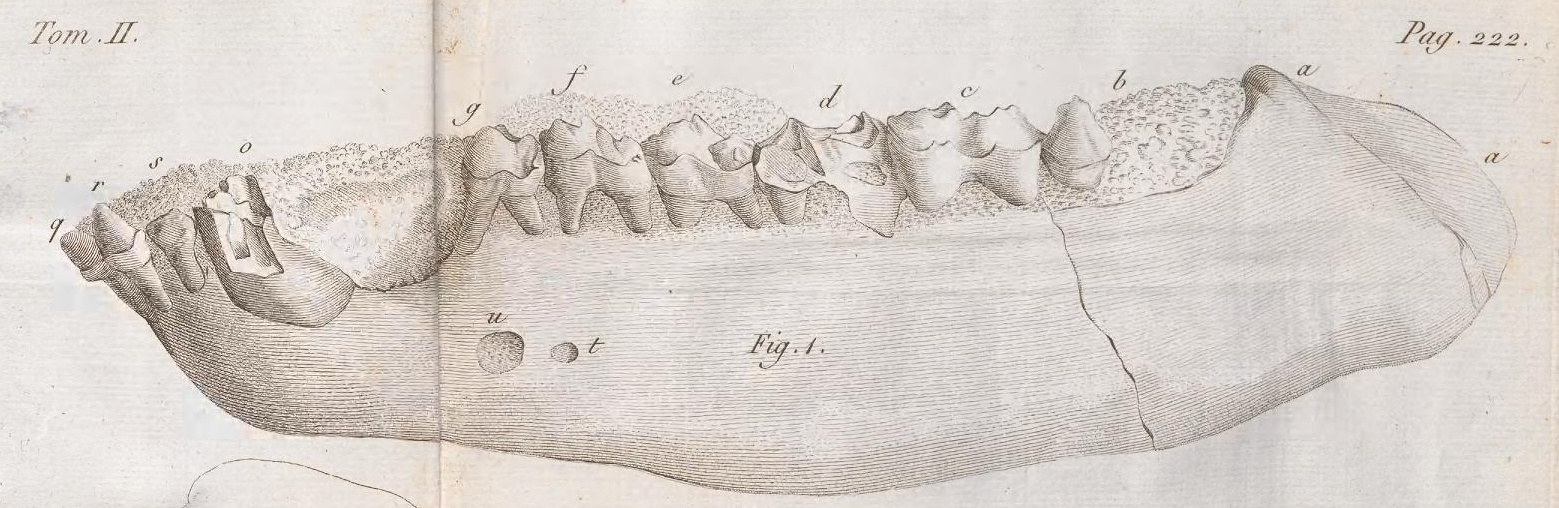
Illustrations of the lower jaws of Lophiodon tapirotherium from Issel including one mostly complete one featured in both images, 1822

In the second volume of a research book series in 1822, Cuvier described fossil remains he suggested belong to Lophiodon, proposing that there are multiple species but not assigning species names to them. The first species he described, "average" in size, was originally unearthed from the French commune of Issel within the department of Aude. Cuvier stated that the collection of fossils belonging to this particular species was held by the nobleman Philippe-Laurent de Joubert then studied by Cuvier himself a few years before writing his research. Describing fossil jaws, femora, and tibias, Cuvier wrote that it would have analogous to tapirs and was nearly the same size as the South American tapir. He also said that there were two other species of Lophiodon at Issel; one was smaller in size, had slender legs, and was known by a partial jaw and heads of a femur and tibia. The other, he communicated, was larger than the other two species and was known only by postcranial evidence consisting of a femur, humerus, scapula, ulna, and astragalus.

He also described several species from the commune of Argenton-sur-Creuse, located within the French department of Indre. An inhabitant named Mr. Bollinat had collected fossils from his workers at a marl pit and sent them to a king's cabinet under the invitation of the French consul Charles Étienne Coquebert de Montbret. Cuvier mentioned that the dentition of the first described species of the locality, large in size, closely resembled those of Issel, and were similar to rhinoceroses as well. He also assigned a radius and a humerus to it. Cuvier also admitted that it was so similar to the large species from Issel that he could not discount the two individuals being the same species. The second species of the locality, Cuvier continued, had smaller teeth than the first, was known by dentition only, and would have been the size of a Malayan tapir. He also recorded a small species and another very small species from dental evidence (the former of which he stated was also known by a fragmentary astragalus and ulna).

Cuvier then described additional fossils assigned to Lophiodon that were found in the freshwater limestone in a hill range called Vosges (more specifically the Bastberg Hill), located near the French commune of Bouxwiller (or "Buchsweiler") within the department of Bas-Rhin. He wrote that the late French geologist Barthélemy Faujas de Saint-Fond had notified him of the fossils seen in the studies of the then-deceased French naturalist Jean-Frédéric Hermann; Hermann's son-in-law, Frédéric-Louis Hammer, lent him his father-in-law's fossil collection and added in more fossils found from the original site. Cuvier then listed a large-sized species (larger than the Malayan tapir and large-sized species of Lophiodon at Issel and Argenton) known from a partial lower jaw and a fragmentary femur, previously named P. tapiroïdes, and another smaller-sized species known only from dental fossils that he said was previously named P. buxovillanum.

The French naturalist then listed another species known from a last upper molar from the French commune of Soissons in the department of Aisne, suggesting that it was related to the large-sized species from Bastberg and Argenton. Another species he recorded was a tooth from an unknown locality, which he said may have belonged to a large Lophiodon species from the Bastberg Hill. He then noted two species from quarries of a small settlement called Montabusard in the French commune of Ingré in the department of Loiret near the city of Orléans. He said that the fossils were collected by a merchant and natural history hobbyist from Orléans named Mr. Defay. The first species was large-sized; was known by a partial lower jaw, lower tibia, and astragalus (the latter uncovered from a quarry in Orléans by a pharmacist named Mr. Prozet); and was previously named P. giganteum. The second species, he wrote, was smaller-sized, and was known by humeri, which were before assigned to P. aurelianense. He also recalled being in the Swiss city of Geneva and finding some teeth in the office of a late man named G. A. Dulec, which were found in the French village of Boutonnet near the city of Montpellier. He additionally documented a fragmentary femur and partial humerus from the commune of Mons-en-Laonnois for the sake of not "neglect[ing] anything that could belong to this genus". Lastly, he documented a pelvis that he purchased from peasants of the valley Valdarno (or the Arno Valley), speculating that the probable Lophiodon species was larger than a Malayan tapir but smaller than an ox.

In his third research book entry, published the same year, Cuvier wrote that fossils of Lophiodon were commonly found in fossil deposits with those of Palaeotherium, a notable exception being in the Paris Basin. He also wrote about a femur found at the commune of Clermont-Ferrand that was found and lent to him by Royal College of Clermont-Ferrand physics and natural history professor Abbé Lacoste, noting that it is larger than that of the Sumatran rhinoceros and suggesting that it belonged to the large-sized species known from Montabusard. The same year, French zoologist Anselme Gaëtan Desmarest listed multiple species, all described but most previously named by Cuvier: L. giganteum and L. aurelienense of Orléans, L. tapiroides and L. buschsowillanum of Bouxwiller, and L. tapirotherium and L. occitanicum of Issel. The species name L. tapirotherium is derived from the genus name Tapirotherium from Blainville that was effectively synonymized. He also suggested the species names L. orléanais and L. occitanique to replace L. aurelianense and L. occitanicum, respectively. Additionally, French zoologist Johann Baptist Fischer listed the multiple species of Lophiodon described by Cuvier, among them the "average-sized" L. Tapirotherium from Issel whose scientific name he credited to Cuvier.

In 1829, Fischer relisted Lophiodon species previously described by Cuvier but wrote of additional species names based on the fossils that Cuvier had already described without having assigned names to them: L. Isselense of Issel and L. medium, L. minutum, and L. minimum of Argenton. Saxon palaeontologist Gotthelf Fischer von Waldheim erected L. sibiricus the same year, describing the genus as having had its name derived from the transverse ridges on its molars. L. sibiricus, he said, was found in the limestone deposits with blue copper oxide in Siberia at the Miass River at what was then the Orenburg Governorate and must have been gigantic based on its canine tooth being 32 in (810 mm) long. He also had portions of a femur and tibia but could not confirm if it belonged to the same species. The same year, German naturalist Johann Jakob Kaup erected the genus Deinotherium, basing it off of fossil material that Cuvier previously said belonged to "tapirs gigantesques" and reusing the "giganteus" species name for it. Therefore, all the "tapir" fossil material described by Cuvier that were not assigned to Lophiodon were instead transferred to Deinotherium.

=== Early 19th century taxonomy ===
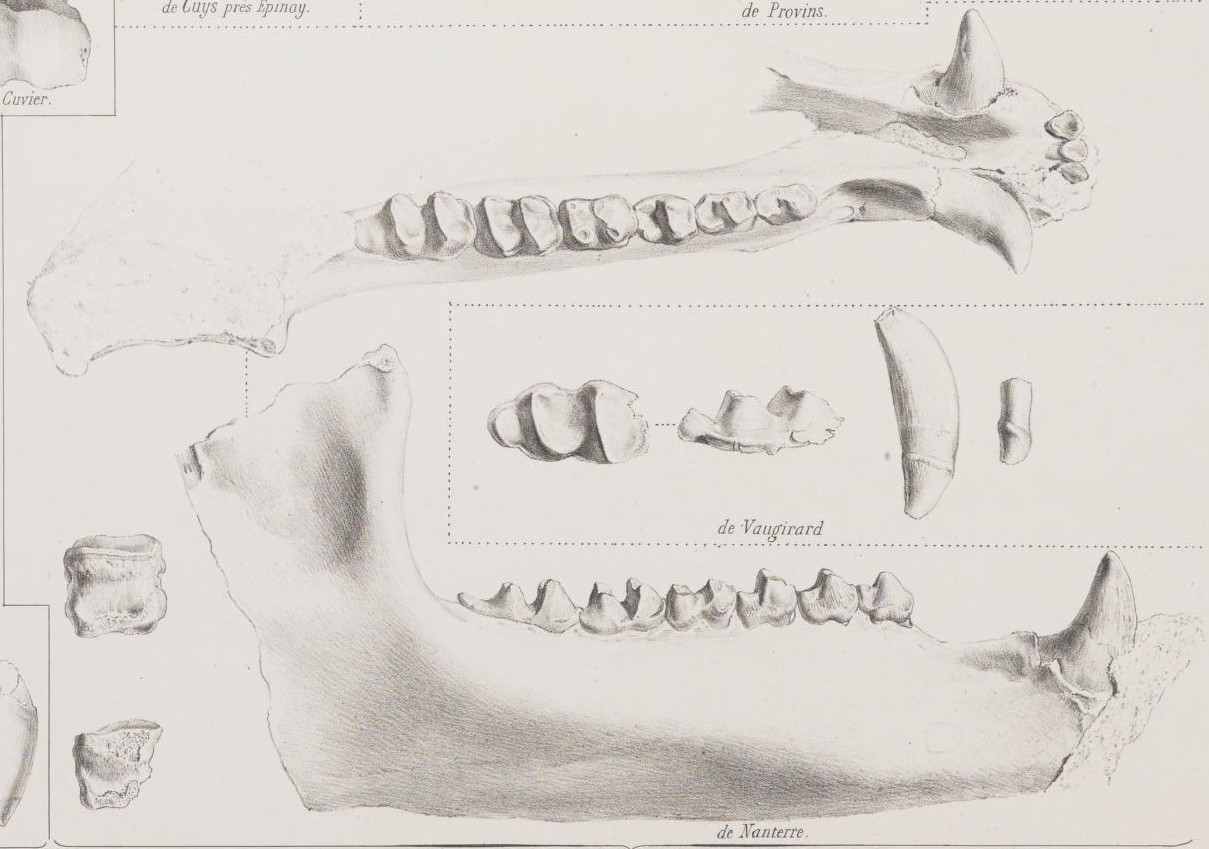
Illustrations of cranial and dental fossils of L. parisiense from Nanterre and Vaugirard, 1839–1864

In 1832, German palaeontologist Christian Erich Hermann von Meyer, in addition to listing species of Lophiodon named previously by Cuvier and other naturalists, himself erected L. Monspessulanum based on fossil remains from Montpellier that he attributed to having been previously described by Cuvier. The same year, Kaup established the name L. Goldfusii based on molars. In another source, he erected the genus Chalicotherium based on fossils from the Grand Duchy of Hesse, transferring "L." Goldfussii into the taxon as Chalicotherium Goldfussii. In 1833, French naturalist Nérée Boubée listed another new species L. muliere-dentatus from the French commune of L'Isle-Jourdain in the department of Gers. He said that Cuvier previously described the dental remains that he before presented to him. In 1837, German palaeontologist Georg Friedrich von Jäger named L. molassicus based on an upper molar, writing that it was somewhat larger than L. tapiroides.

In 1844, French naturalist Pierre Toussaint Marcel de Serres de Mesplès erected L. magnum for the species from the Bastberg Hill that was also previously written about by Cuvier. Later, von Meyer established the genus Anchitherium based on the species "P." aurelianense (also named "L." aurelianense) as previously named by Cuvier. In 1845, British palaeontologist Richard Owen erected the Lophiodon subgenus Coryphodon, describing it as horse-sized and roughly contemporaneous with "true" species of Lophiodon. He said that Corphodon differed from other Lophiodon species by the second and third cusps of the last lower molar that are combined into an obtuse-angled ridge. In 1846, Owen created the species name C. eocænus of the species he first recognized the previous year for Coryphodon when it was named. In an 1839–1864 osteography, Blainville confirmed the validities of various Lophiodon species erected from previous studies (he listed Coryphodon as a subgenus but also recognized the name L. eocaenum and also wrote the name L. minus as a synonym of L. minimum) but found L. Arvense (named by Blainville in the same work), L. Monspessulanum, and L. Sibericum to all be invalid species. He also said that L. giganteum (or P. giganteum) was based on rhinocerotid bones and therefore did not belong to Lophiodon. He additionally named the species L. commune based on a specimen with a nearly complete set of right-sided molars (he studied a museum cast and argued that it was the largest individual of the species) which was previously written about from a note in an academic journal by Mr. Naudot. He also wrote of a nearly complete lower jaw he designated to the same species from the French locality of Nanterre, which he said was first described by Dr. Robert. Blainville additionally wrote that another newly recognized species, one from Soisson, was L. anthracoideum while another, a small species from Argenton, was named L. quintum.

In 1847, German palaeontologist Christoph Gottfried Andreas Giebel, while considering most other named species of Lophiodon to be valid, reaffirmed Tapirotherium as a synonym of Lophiodon and also considered L. molassicus to be synonymous with L. tapiroides. The same year, French palaeontologist Auguste Pomel wrote of a small species from coarse limestone deposits at the French locality of Passy, suggesting that it was similar to the equoid Hyracotherium. He continued that he received information regarding the fossils from an individual named Duval, who possessed them. He assigned it the species name L. Duvalii and classified it to the subgenus Pachynolophus. He also erected another name L. Vismei and classified it to Pachynolophus, describing the species of larger in size than L. commune and L. Duvalii. Pomel also said that L. anthracoides and Anthracotherium lophiodon, both species names written by Blainville, are synonymous with Coryphodon eocaenus; he also referenced Corphodon as a distinct genus from Lophiodon. In another journal volume, Pomel erected another species from Passy named L. mastolophus, suggesting that it differs from Hyracotherium leporinum. He also reaffirmed that "L. anthracoides" was not a species of Lophiodon but instead belonged to Corphodon. In 1849, French naturalist Paul Gervais assigned another name L. leptognatum to the "Hyracotherium of Passy." The same year, French palaeontologist Charles Léopold Laurillard applied the name L. parvulum based on a species reportedly two-thirds the size of the American tapir that Cuvier previously described from Argenton. In 1850, German palaeontologist Heinrich Georg Bronn wrote that L. commune was a synonym of other Lophiodon species, L. magnum was a possible synonym of L. buxovillanum, and considered Pachynolophus to be a distinct genus and P. duvali to be its first named species, of which L. mastolophus and L. leptognathum are synonyms.

In 1849, Gervais, considering Pachynolophus to be a subgenus of Lophiodon, erected P. cesserasicum based on fossils from the French commune of Cesseras. In an 1848–1852 work, he wrote of another new species L. parisiense, basing it on fossils from Nanterre, Passy, Vaugirard and potentially Provins that were previously described by other palaeontologists like Blainville in his osteology series of fossil animals. He also suggested that dental fossils from the French commune of Cuis, smaller than those of Passy, may be of a different species. In 1851, French naturalist Jean-Baptiste Noulet wrote of a large-sized lower jawbone donated by Mr. Belhomme in 1845. The fossil was previously collected by Count de Foucaud at his estate in Braconac in the French commune of Lautrec; he gave it to Belhomme to be kept within the French city of Toulouse and presented to the local municipality. Having studied the fossil repeatedly, he presented it to fellow French palaeontologist Édouard Lartet, who agreed with him on the bones having belonged to a new species of Lophiodon. Noulet cited his inspiration of French palaeontologist Charles Léopold Laurillard and his pledge for Belhomme and later Lartet to specifically publish research on de Foucaud's fossil as the reason of the article on what he considered to be an "interesting discovery." He continued that the mandible in question consisted of three incisors, a canine, and six molars on each side. He felt that the dental formula and the dental anatomy clearly proved that the fossil belonged to the genus Lophiodon but was initially unsure of what to make out of the double crescent ridges of the back molars. He later observed Cuvier's descriptions and figures of Lophiodon and found it to be in common with Lophiodon rather than other mammals like rhinoceroses and Palaeotherium. He also described the fossil as being a third larger than L. tapiroides from Bouxwiller. He gave the fossil the species name L. Lautricense, also listing the name "Lautrec's Lophiodon" in reference to the locality that the lower jaw was found at.

=== Late 19th century taxonomy ===
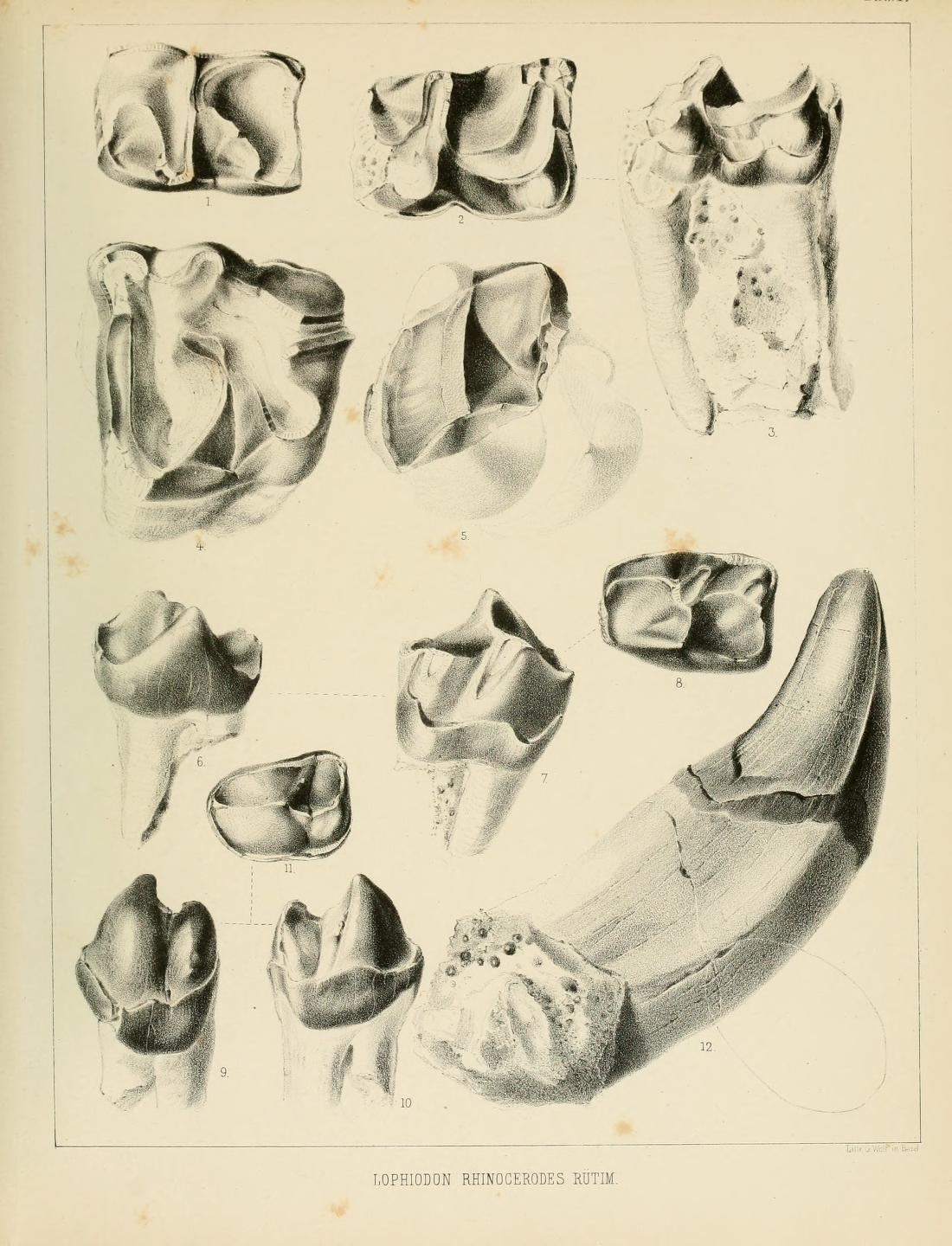
Illustrations of the dental fossils of L. rhinocerotodes, 1862

In 1861, German palaeontologist Johann Andreas Wagner erected L. commune var. (varietas) franconica based on dental fossils from the market town of Heidenheim am Hahnenkamm. In 1862, Swiss palaeontologist Ludwig Ruetimeyer studied fossils of multiple species of Lophiodon, including dental material from the Swiss municipality of Egerkingen. Among the teeth that he was able to identify was a large-sized canine, which he suggested had a resemblance to those found in carnivorous animals. As a result, he said, he designated the fossil material to the large-sized species L. rhinocerodes. He also wrote about dental material from the same locality that he designated to another named species L. cartieri, but he later transferred the species to its own genus Chasmotherium. In 1864, French palaeontologist Adolphe Watelet wrote a letter to Gabriel Auguste Daubrée of the French Academy of Sciences regarding a new species of Lophiodon in the French commune of Aizy-Jouy at the department of Aisne, which was read by the society's secretary. The fossils, discovered by quarrymen, were first written about in an article dating to 21 April 1863 by a Soissons librarian by the name of Mr. Calland. The exclusive news report was written by the librarian and an editor but reportedly never listed any genus name and did not elaborate on the importance of the discovery. Watelet wrote that the discovery was of a large and complete Lophiodon skull, which he considered to be a "triumph of science", especially due to how typically fragmented the fossils of the genus were. He designated the fossils to the species name L. cuvieri as a tribute to Georges Cuvier. In 1865, naturalist G.A. Maack recognized the previously erected L. franconica as a distinct species (suggesting it to be closely related to L. commune) from Heidenheim am Hahnenkamm. The same year, Swiss palaeontologist François Jules Pictet de la Rive wrote in his illustrated figures the species name L. douteux; however, he wrote in his preceding descriptions that he was unsure if the dental fossils assigned to Lophiodon actually belonged to the genus.

In 1868, American palaeontologist Joseph Leidy wrote of a molar from a Badlands fossil collection belonging to Ferdinand Vandeveer Hayden that he thought was similar to those of Lophiodon. Leidy assigned the specimen to the new species name L. occidentalis. In 1870, in a scientific conference, Leidy again discussed Hayden's fossil collections, this time an upper molar near Fort Bridger in the American state of Wyoming. He assigned the tooth to another species that he named L. modestus. In 1871, another American palaeontologist Othniel Charles Marsh erected several species that he classified within Lophiodon, the first being L. Bairdianus with several partial skeletons from Wyoming that were smaller than South American tapirs but larger than L. modestus. The second species named in the article, L. affinis, was described by Marsh as being a smaller species known from several molars. He also listed a third and small-sized species L. nanus based on multiple specimens like an upper along with a fourth, diminutive L. pumilus based on a fragmented upper jaw. Marsh also proposed another species L. validus from a fossil tooth from the state of New Jersey. The next year in 1872, he reclassified "L." nanus to the newly named tapiroid genus Helaletes. In 1873, Leidy reclassified "L." modestus and "L." nanus to the rhinocerotoid genus Hyrachyus and synonymized L. Bairdianus with Hyrachyus agrarius. He also referenced another name L. oregonensis from the American locality of Bridge Creek in the state of Oregon. In 1877, Marsh erected the tapirid genus Tapiravus, for which the reclassified "L." validus became its type species.

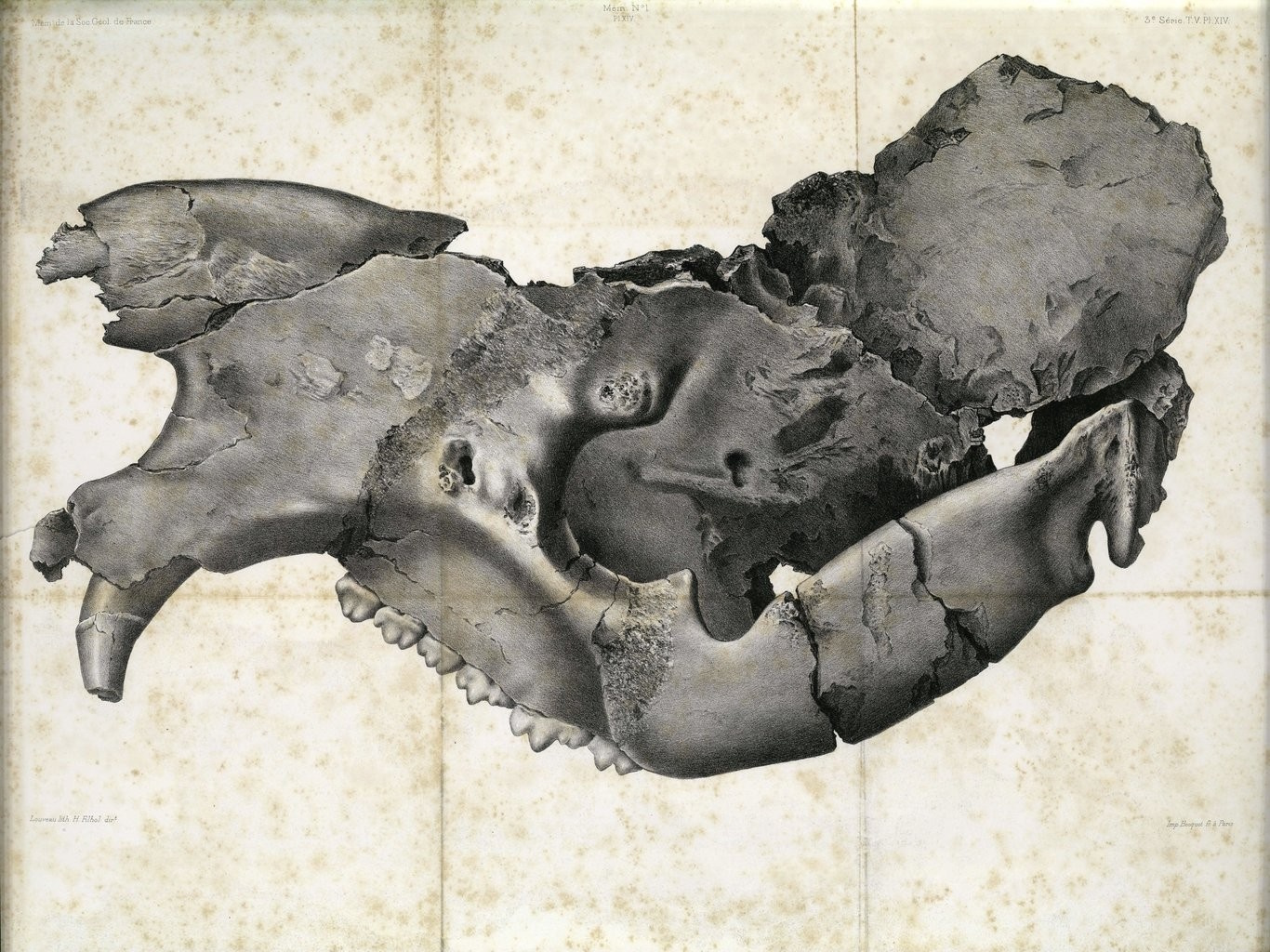
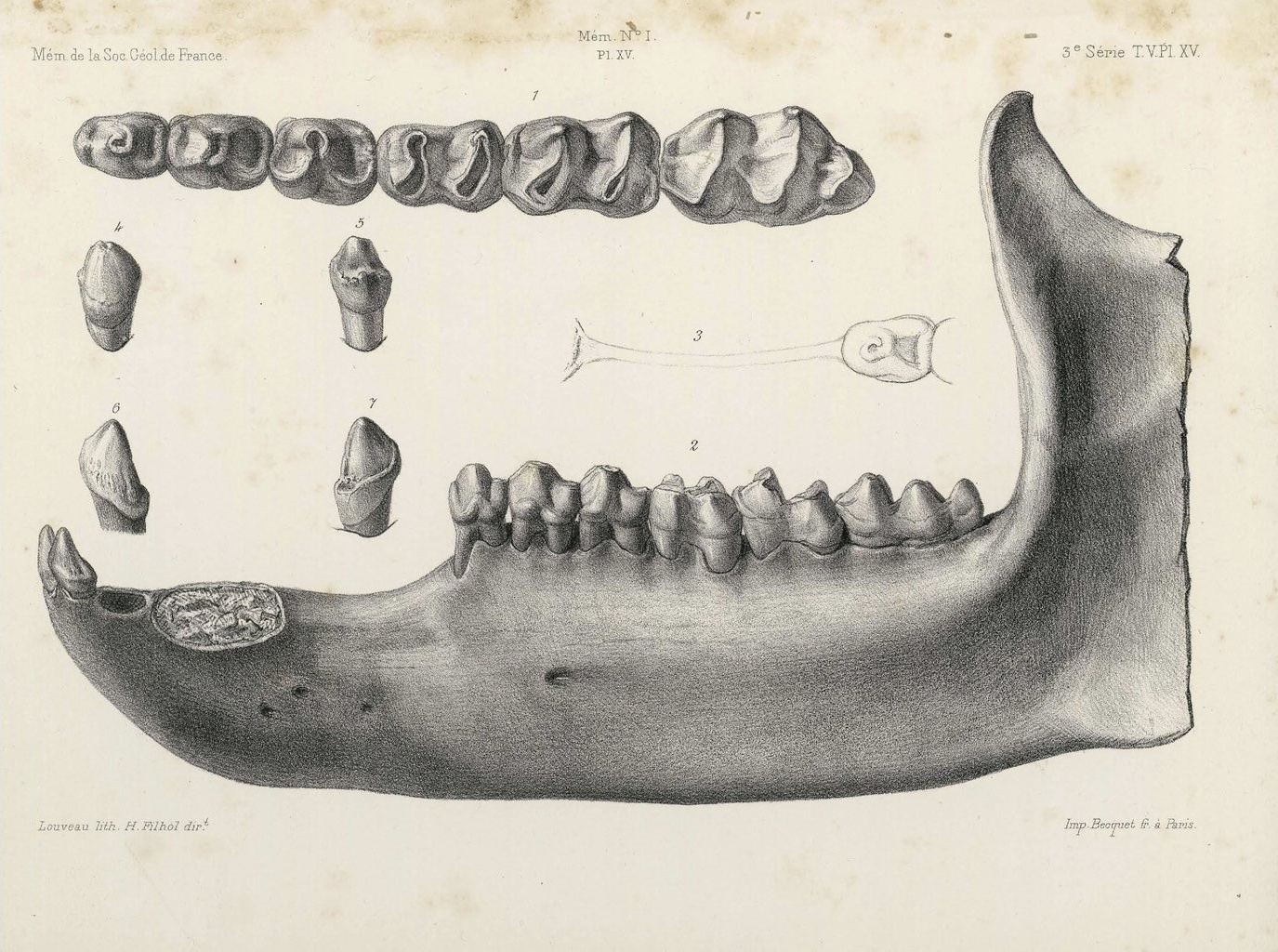
Illustrations of the cranium (left) and mandible and lower dentition (right) of L. cuvieri from Aizy-Jouy, 1888

In 1876, Gervais wrote of various bone fragments from the French commune of Saint-Ouen-sur-Seine, including a lumbar vertebra, scapula, astragalus, calcaneum, and the upper part of either a metacarpal or metatarsal bone. Considering the animal to be of the order Edentata and noticing anatomical similarities to Macrotherium and Ancylotherium, he proposed that the bones were distinct enough for the individual animal to belong to a separate genus and species that he named Pernatherium rugosum. In 1878, French palaeontologist Armand Victor Lemoine listed another new species L. Remensis but did not further elaborate on how the species came to be recognized. He also listed the possibility of there being two additional species of Lophiodon without names or other forms of elaboration. In 1879, Lemoine elaborated that at the French city of Reims were fossils of multiple species of Lophiodon including L. parisiense, the previously named L. remense based on a large chunk of a skull and other bones, and another newly named species L. heberti, which he argued most closely resembled rhinoceroses.

In 1880, American palaeontologist Edward Drinker Cope erected two additional species in Lophiodon from the Badlands of the Wind River locality in Wyoming. The first named species, L. calciculus, was known from three lower jaws with dentition while the second erected one, L. ventorum, was larger than the other species and had specific dental differences according to him. In 1882, based on dental differences from Lophiodon, he erected Heptodon for the species "L." ventorum. In 1883, he also listed "L." calciculus as a species of Heptodon.

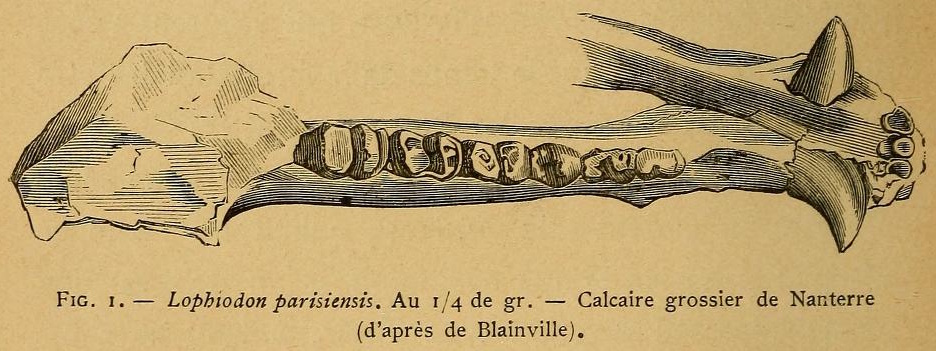
1888 illustration of the mandible of L. parisiensis from Nanterre at an upper view

In 1886, British palaeontologist Richard Lydekker rejected Ruetimeyer's 1862 suggestion that Pachynolophus prevosti should be synonymized into L. prevosti and reaffirmed L. anthracoideum was synonymous with Coryphodon eocaenus. In 1888, French palaeontologist Henri Filhol wrote that his colleague Jean Albert Gaudry gave him two partial maxillae of Lophiodon from land bordering Cesseras that was handed to a museum in Paris by Mr. Pittore. He assigned it the species name L. leptorhynchus and remarked that the species is very easy to identify. He also considered L. commune to be synonymous with L. isselense. In another 1888 work of Filhol, the palaeontologist erected the species Hyrachyus intermedius (spelled as "Hyrachius") and synonymized both L. minimum and L. minus with it. Filhol also erected several species of Lophiodon, the first being L. leptorhynchum (or L. leptorhynchus) based on a lower jaw from the commune of Pépieux. The second species Filhol named was L. sezannense based on dental evidence from the French commune of Sézanne. The third species he named, L. Munieri, was based on a partial lower jaw with dentition that he considered to be similar to L. isselense. Filhol then described an upper jaw fragment from the lignite deposits of a museum in Paris that he referred to his fourth named species L. Larteti, derived from the palaeontologist Lartet. He then referred to Lophiodon fossils previously described from the French Pyrenean Basin localities of Saint-Quentin and Sibrac (or Sibra) in the commune of Lagarde in the department Ariège by French palaeontologist Jean-Jacques Pouech in 1886. He then designated the "Lophiodon of Sibrac" another species name L. subpyrenaicum. The naturalist described a partial lower jaw from Cesseras given to him by his colleague Joseph Henri Ferdinand Douvillé, describing the dentition as similar to Lophiodon but arguing that it was not of the same genus because of an absence of a third lobe on the last molar. He gave it the new genus name Cesserasictis and the species name Cesserasictis antiquus. Furthermore, Filhol referenced Watelet's 1864 naming of L. cuvieri and decided to continue using the name in application of the skull that was not previously illustrated until the 1888 work.

In 1891, Ruetimeyer wrote of another upper dental row from Lophiodon from Egerkingen, describing its anatomies. He observed that the dentition could not have been those of Hyrachyus, Protapirus, or "Palaeotapirus" despite arguing that the dentition was similar to both Lophiodon and tapirs, instead assigning it to the newly named L. annectens. In 1891–1893, German palaeontologist Karl Alfred von Zittel reclassified L. cartieri into Helaletes and considered L. annectens to fall within the rhinocerotoid genus Isectolophus. In 1893, American palaeontologists Jacob Lawson Wortman and Charles Earle reclassified "L." occidentalis to the tapiroid genus Colodon.

== Later taxonomy ==
=== Early 20th century taxonomy ===
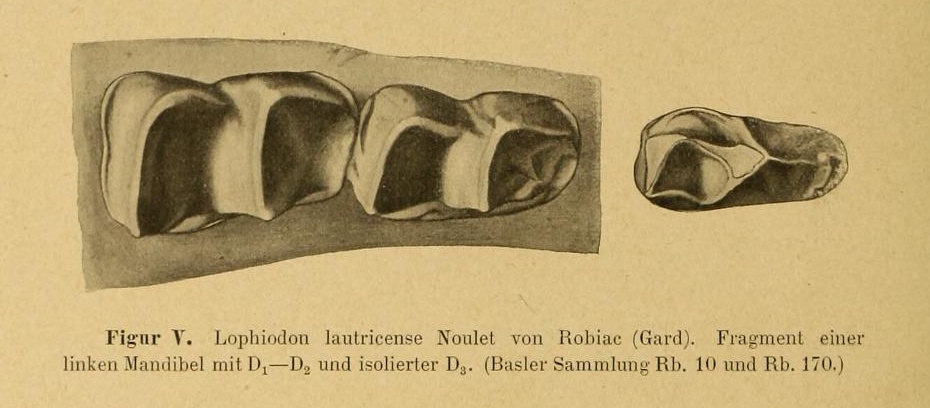
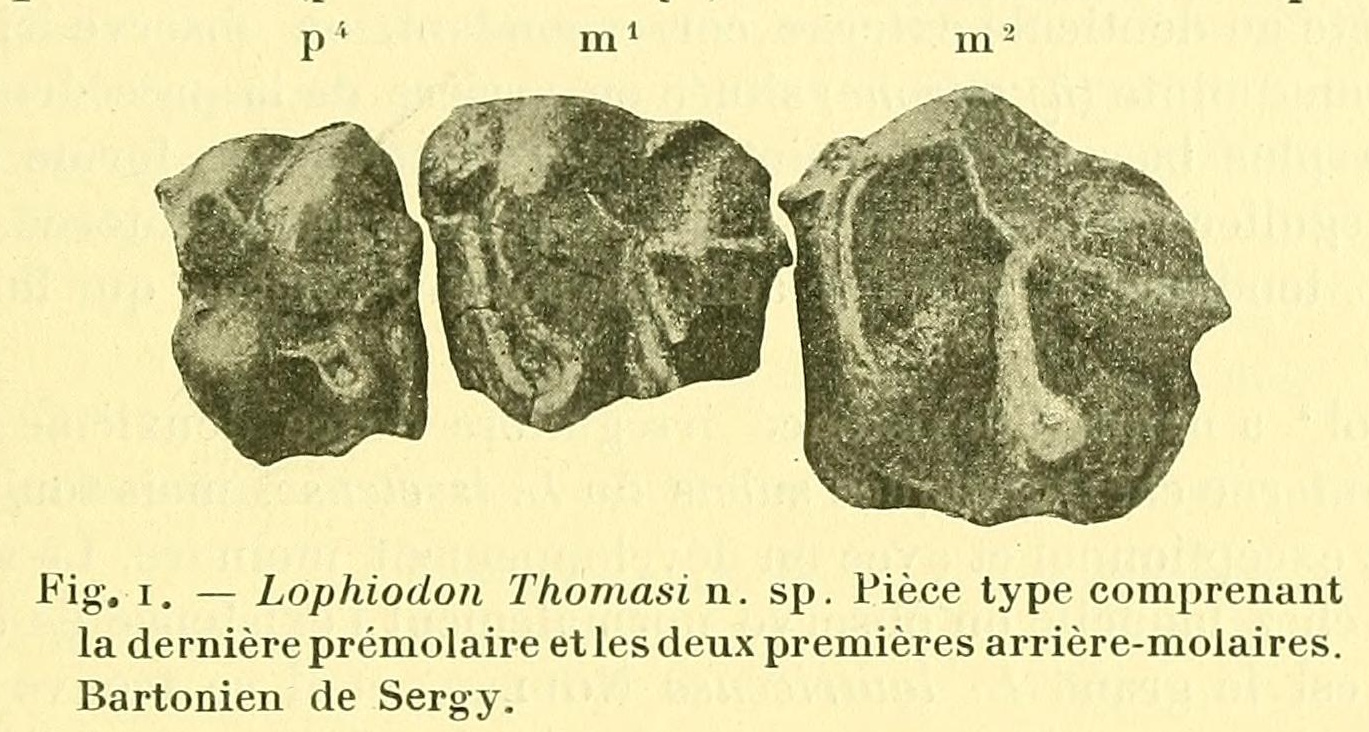
1903 illustration of the lower dentition of L. lautricense (left) and 1906 image of the upper dentition of L. thomasi (right)

In 1902, Italian palaeontologist Carlo De Stefani presented a note from his colleague Camillo Bosco. In the note, Bosco wrote of fragments of a perissodactyl's jaw that was sent to a geological museum of the University of Pisa by the Monteponite mining engineer and director Emilio Ferraris in 1882 from the province of South Sardinia. He continued that in 1891, Swiss palaeontologist Charles Immanuel Forsyth Major considered the fossils to have belonged to L. isselensis. Crediting palaeontological colleague Mario Canavari, he wrote about the specimens and assigned them to the newly erected L. Sardus. In 1903, French palaeontologist Charles Depéret synonymized Cesserasictis antiquus with L. leptorhynchus. Later in the same year, Swiss palaeontologist Hans Georg Stehlin wrote an extensive study on Chasmotherium and Lophiodon, first considering L. minimum to be a valid species but instead belonging to Chasmotherium and synonymizing both L. parvulum and L. minutum with it. He agreed with Depéret in the synonymization of Cesserasictis with Lophiodon and recognized various species classified to Lophiodon without having been synonymized by prior palaeontologists as valid and recognized L. commune var. franconica as L. lautricense var. franconica. He also listed L. douteux as synonymous with L. lautricense, questioned justification of differentiation between L. occitanicum and L. subpyrenaicum, considered L. larteti to be potentially synonymous with L. remense, synonymized L. Munieri with L. parisiense, and implied L. Heberti to be synonymous with L. buxovillanum and L. sezannense to be synonymous with L. rhinocerorodes. In 1906, palaeontologist H. Thomas wrote about Lophiodon remains from a marl pit in Soissons, initially having thought that the tooth fragments belonged to L. parisiensis. He visited the marl pit again and found more complete specimens; Stehlin and Depéret both determined that the fossils belonged to an undocumented species of Lophiodon, the latter of whom agreed to study it. Depéret wrote that the Lophiodon species in question was medium-sized, was found near the commune of Fère-en-Tardenois in Aisne, and was known from a series of upper molars along some premolars and an incisor. He named the species L. thomasi, dedicating it to H. Thomas for having found the fossils.

In 1910, Depéret erected the lophiodont genus Lophiaspis, reclassifying "Lophiodon" occitanicus as one of its species. In 1914, American palaeontologists William Jacob Holland and Olof August Peterson reclassified "L." oregonensis into the chalicothere genus Moropus. In 1918, Stehlin wrote about Pernatherium rugosum, which he said had not been referenced by any naturalist other than Gervais. He stated that he wrote his thoughts on the genus as problematic back in 1909 since it did appear to have been a chalicothere, especially proven by his more recent study suggesting that the postcranial anatomy was dissimilar to them. He suggested that the foot bones were most similar to L. leptorhynchum. Thus, he considered the "Pernatherium" bones to have actually of a Lophiodon species or a closely related perissodactyl. In 1938, dissertation student E. Schertz erected two more species of Lophiodon: L. parvum and L. germanicum.

=== Late 20th century to early 21st century taxonomy ===
In 1960, French palaeontologist Gaston Astre wrote about fossils of multiple newly recognized species of Lophiodon, among them a very small species from Issel that he tentatively assigned to its own species L. glandicus, named after the stream of Glande within the same locality. He also documented a large-sized and elongated maxilla that he assigned to the erected L. compactus, named in reference to the thick and short appearance of the mandibular symphysis. In 1964, German palaeontologist Karl-Heinz Fischer synonymized L. parvum with L. tapirotherium, L. germanicum with L. cuvieri, L. cesserasicum with L. occitanicus, and L. rhinocerodes var. franconica with L. lautricense. He also wrote of a new species name L. filholi, replacing the previous L. isselensis and noting that it existed in Issel. He also reaffirmed that L. Heberti was synonymous with L. buchsowillanum and L. sezannense with L. rhinocerorodes. In 1964, dissertation student Christian Montenat erected the subspecies L. isselense var. minor from the French commune of Eygalayes. In 1966, palaeontologists Donald Elvin Savage, Donald E. Russell, and Pierre Louis considered "Chasmotherium" minimum to actually be a species of Hyrachyus and reaffirmed the synonymization of L. larteti with L. remensis.

In 1971, French palaeontologist Jean-Jacques Jaeger chose to recognize L. isselense as the species name rather than L. filholi. In 1977, palaeontologist Pierre Dedieu erected the lophiodont genus Paralophiodon, where "L." buschowillanus, "L." isselensis, and "L." compactus were all reclassified into. The same year, Fischer erected the genus Rhinocerolophiodon, where "L." buxovillanum was also reclassified to. He also confirmed L. filholi being synonymous with L. isselensis and transferred "L." leptorhynchum into Lophiaspis. In 1983, Italian palaeontologists Daniela Esu and Tassos Kotsakis reclassified L. sardus into Paralophiodon. In 1986, British palaeontologist Jerry J. Hooker considered Rhinocerolophiodon to be an objective junior synonym of Paralophiodon but expressed being unsure of if Paralophiodon was its own genus or if "L." leptorhynchum belonged to Lophiaspis. In 1994, Miguel Ángel Cuesta Ruiz-Colmenares considered Paralophiodon to be a distinct genus and revalidated the generic placement of P. leptorhynchum. He also erected L. sanmoralense, naming it after the Spanish province of Salamanca containing the locality of San Morales where the hemimandible of the species was found. In 1997, Spanish palaeontologist Lluís Checa Soler wrote of a new species named L. baroensis, named after the Torre de Baró site in the Ager Basin where its maxilla was found. He also wrote of another named species L. corsaensis, which was previously studied in his 1994 thesis and had its name derived from the type locality and town of Corsà in the Ager Basin where its dental fossils were found. In 2003, Jean Guy Astruc et al. listed L. glandicus and P. compactus as valid species but argued that they remain poorly documented taxa. In 2011, French palaeontologists Henri-Pierre Labarrère and Montenat erected L. eygalayense, its name being derived from Eygalayes where its fossils were found and described as intermediate in size between L. tapirotherium and L. remense; the authors also synonymized L. isselense var. minor with it. In 2018, PhD dissertation student Daniel Zoboli argued that "L." sardus could not have been within Paralophiodon because of its stratigraphic range being earlier than that of the overall genus, but he noted that a revision of the species is necessary. In 2021, Quentin Vautrin et al. determined based on a phylogenetic analysis that Paralophiodon was polyphyletic because of "P." leptorhynchum being nested within the Lophiodon genus clade grouping. In 2024, Monique Vianey-Liaud et al. confirmed their position of L. leptorhynchum belonging to Lophiodon.
