= Heteraletes =

Heteraletes Temporal range: Eocene

Scientific classification
- Kingdom: Animalia
- Phylum: Chordata
- Class: Mammalia
- Order: Perissodactyla
- Superfamily: Tapiroidea
- Genus: †Heteraletes; Peterson, 1931

Type species
- †Heteraletes leotanus Peterson, 1931

Extinct genus of mammals

Heteraletes is an extinct monotypic genus of tapiroid (tapir relative) from the Eocene of North America. It is sometimes classified as a species of Dilophodon, though most studies do not support this position.
