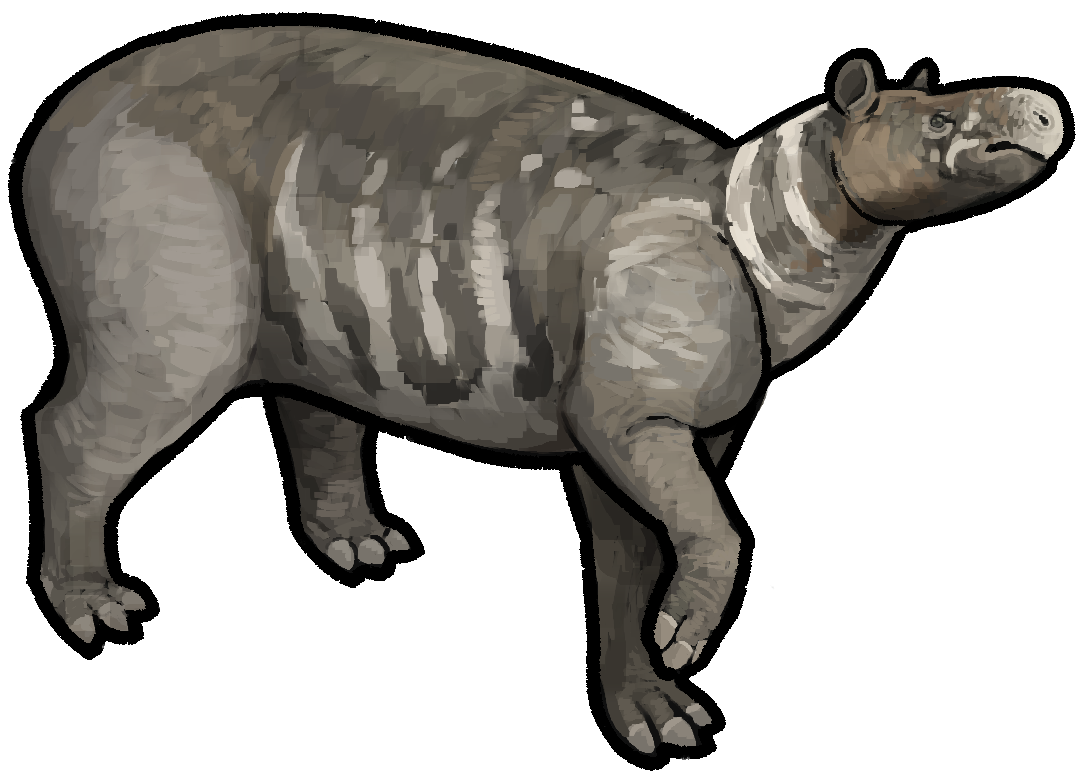
- Life Restoration

Scientific classification
- Kingdom: Animalia
- Phylum: Chordata
- Class: Mammalia
- Order: Perissodactyla
- Family: †Helaletidae
- Genus: †Paracolodon; Matthew & Granger, 1925

Type species
- †Paracolodon inceptus Matthew & Granger, 1925

Species
- P. curtus; P. fissus; P. inceptus

= Paracolodon =

Paracolodon Temporal range: Middle - Late Eocene

Extinct genus of mammals

Paracolodon is an extinct genus of tapiroid perissodactyl belonging to the family Helaletidae. Fossils have been found in Mongolia and the Inner Mongolia region of China.

== Taxonomy ==
Matthew and Granger (1925) described the nominal tapiroid taxa Colodon inceptus and Paracolodon curtus from Eocene-age deposits in East Asia. Radinsky (1965) recognized two nominal species as identical and synonymized Paracolodon with Colodon inceptus. Dashzeveg and Hooker (1997) assigned the nominal tapiroid species "Helalestes" fissus to Colodon, as C. fissus, based on similarities with inceptus. On the basis of new material from the Erlian Basin in Inner Mongolia, Bai et al. (2017) recognized Paracolodon as a distinct genus from Colodon, meaning that P. fissus is a referred species of Paracolodon.
