= Plesiocolopirus =

Plesiocolopirus Temporal range: Eocene

Scientific classification
- Kingdom: Animalia
- Phylum: Chordata
- Class: Mammalia
- Order: Perissodactyla
- Superfamily: Tapiroidea
- Genus: †Plesiocolopirus; Schoch, 1989

Type species
- †Colodon hancocki Radinsky, 1963

Extinct genus of mammals

Plesiocolopirus is an extinct genus of tapiroid (tapir relative) from the Eocene of North America and possibly Asia. It has been variably been classified as a helaletid or tapirid.
