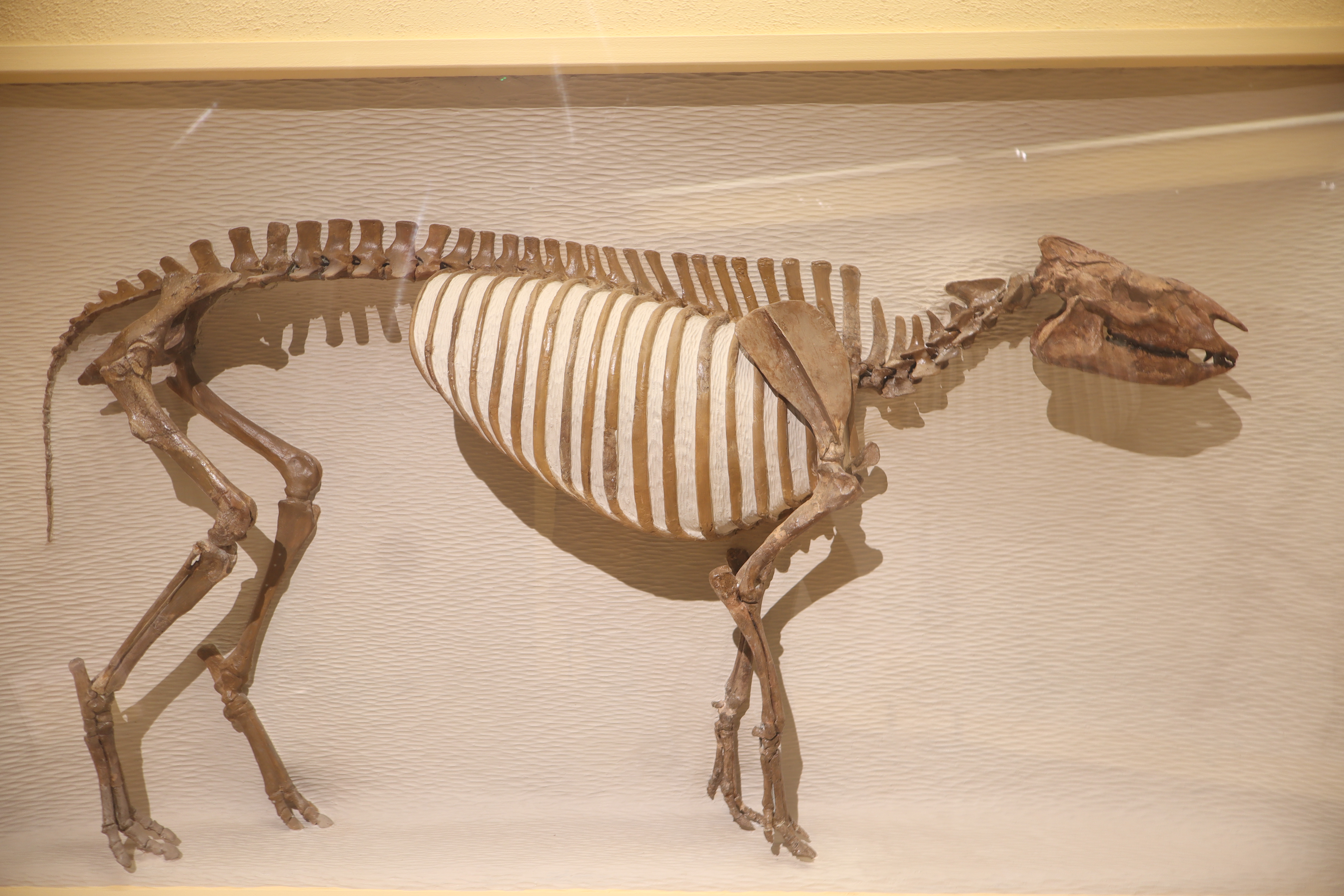
- Skeletal mount of H. posticus, Harvard Museum of Natural History

Scientific classification
- Kingdom: Animalia
- Phylum: Chordata
- Class: Mammalia
- Infraclass: Placentalia
- Order: Perissodactyla
- Superfamily: Tapiroidea
- Family: †Helaletidae
- Genus: †Heptodon; Cope 1882

Species
- †H. calciculus Cope 1880; †H. minimus Qi 1987; †H. niushanensis Chow & Li 1965; †H. posticus Cope 1882

= Heptodon =

Heptodon Temporal range: 50.3–48.6 Ma Ypresian

Extinct genus of mammal

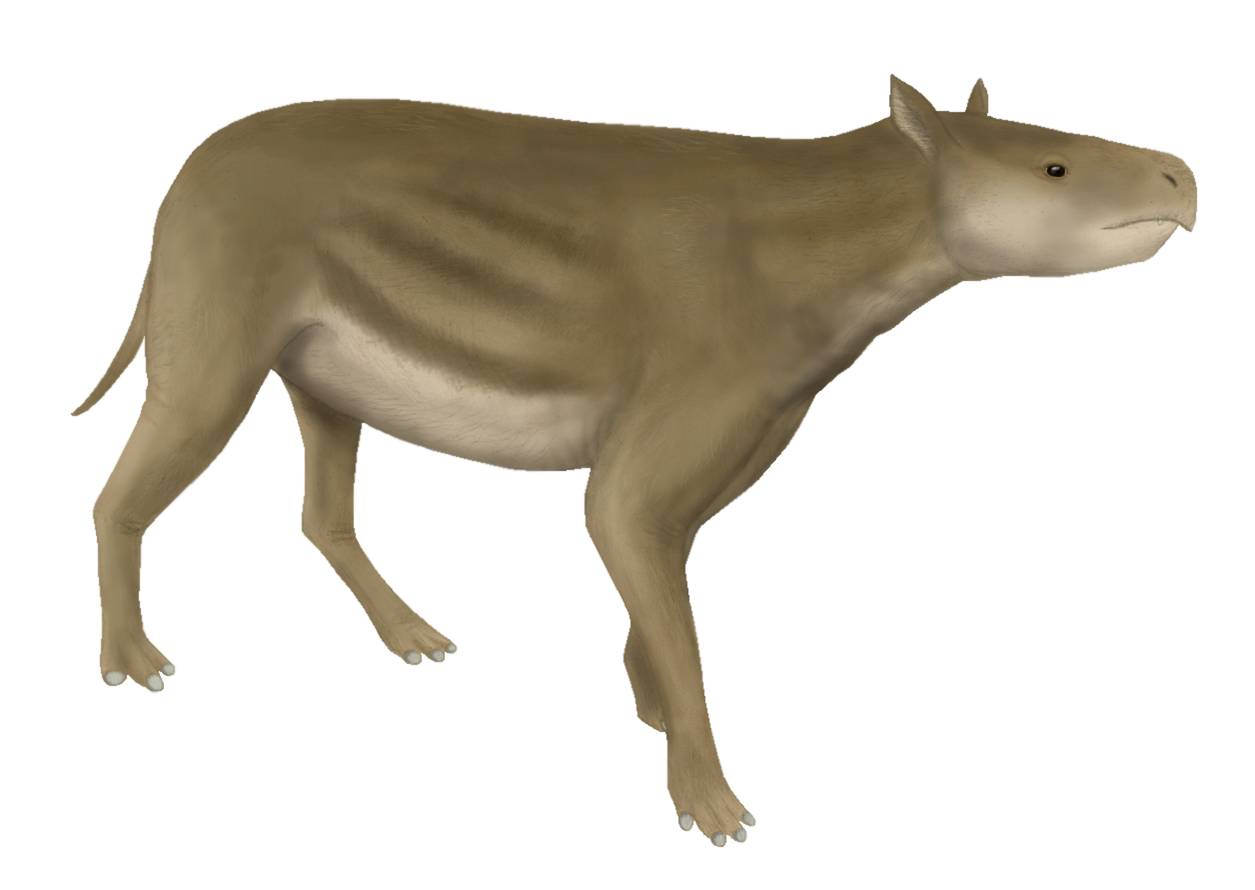
Life restoration of H. posticus

Heptodon is an extinct genus of tapir-type herbivore of the family Helaletidae endemic to North America during the Early Eocene. It lived from 50.3—48.6 mya, existing for approximately 1.7 million years.

Heptodon was about 1 metre (3.3 ft) in length, and closely resembled modern tapirs. The shape of the skull suggests that it probably lacked the characteristic tapir trunk. Instead it probably had a slightly elongated, fleshy upper lip, like its relative Helaletes.

== See also ==
- Fossil Butte National Monument
