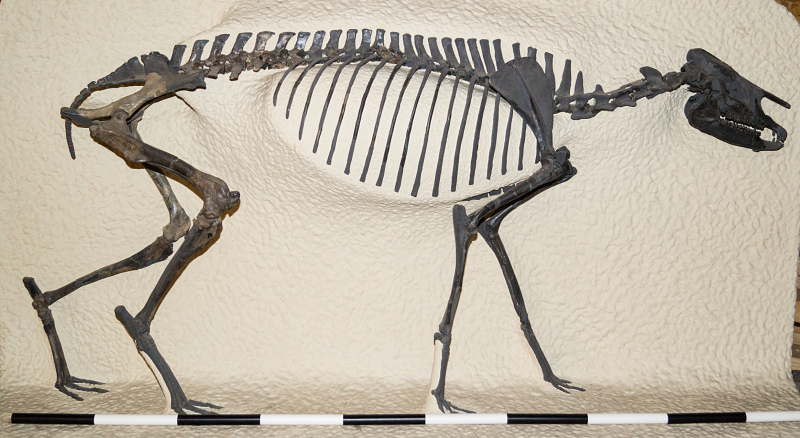
- Skeleton of Helaletes nanus

Scientific classification
- Kingdom: Animalia
- Phylum: Chordata
- Class: Mammalia
- Order: Perissodactyla
- Superfamily: Tapiroidea
- Family: †Helaletidae; Osborn, 1892

Genera
- †Colodon; †Desmatotherium; †Dilophodon; †Haagella; †Helaletes; †Heptodon; †Irdinolophus; †Jhagirilophus; †Paracolodon; †Plesiocolopirus; †Selenaletes; †Thuliadanta; †Vastanolophus

= Helaletidae =

Helaletidae Temporal range: Early Eocene - Miocene

Extinct family of odd-toed ungulates

The Helaletidae are an extinct family of tapiroid, closely related and likely ancestral to the true tapirs, which contain Protapirus and all descendants. In alternative classifications, Helaletidae is treated as a subfamily within the Tapiridae, the Helaletinae.

Members of the family are defined by having less bilophodont cheek teeth compared to other tapiroids.
