= Dilophodon =

Dilophodon Temporal range: Eocene

Scientific classification
- Kingdom: Animalia
- Phylum: Chordata
- Class: Mammalia
- Order: Perissodactyla
- Family: †Helaletidae
- Genus: †Dilophodon; Scott, 1883

Type species
- †Dilophodon minusculus Scott, 1883

Extinct genus of mammals

Dilophodon is an extinct genus of tapiroid (the tapir relatives), possibly a helaletid, from the Eocene of North America.
