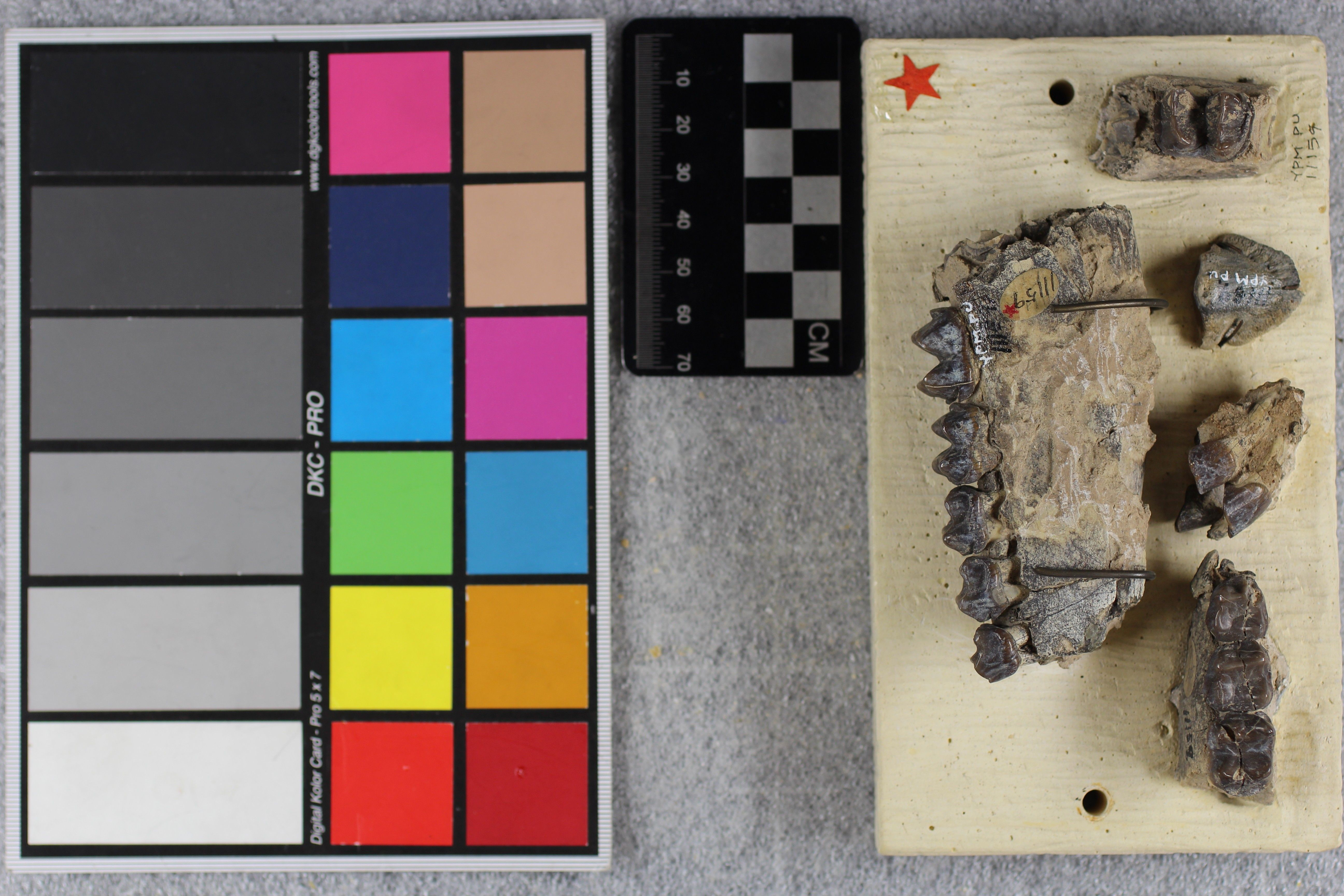
- A mandible of C. occidentalis at the Yale Peabody Museum

Scientific classification
- Kingdom: Animalia
- Phylum: Chordata
- Class: Mammalia
- Order: Perissodactyla
- Family: †Helaletidae
- Genus: †Colodon; Marsh, 1890

Type species
- †Colodon occidentalis Leidy, 1868

Species
- C. angulatus; C. kayi; C. occidentalis; C. stovalli; C. woodi

= Colodon =

Colodon Temporal range: Late Eocene - Early Oligocene

Extinct genus of mammals

Colodon is an extinct genus of herbivorous mammals that were related to tapirs of today.

== Taxonomy ==
Species of Colodon were originally placed within the genus Lophiodon but were later found to be distinct.

== Description ==
Colodon had small or absent canines and short, broad cheek teeth. The skull had a greatly enlarged narial incision and greatly reduced nasals. Similarities between the skulls of Colodon and true tapirs suggest it may have had a very small trunk as well.

Colodon first appeared in the Late Eocene and lasted until the Whitneyan.
