= Aizy-Jouy =

- Commune
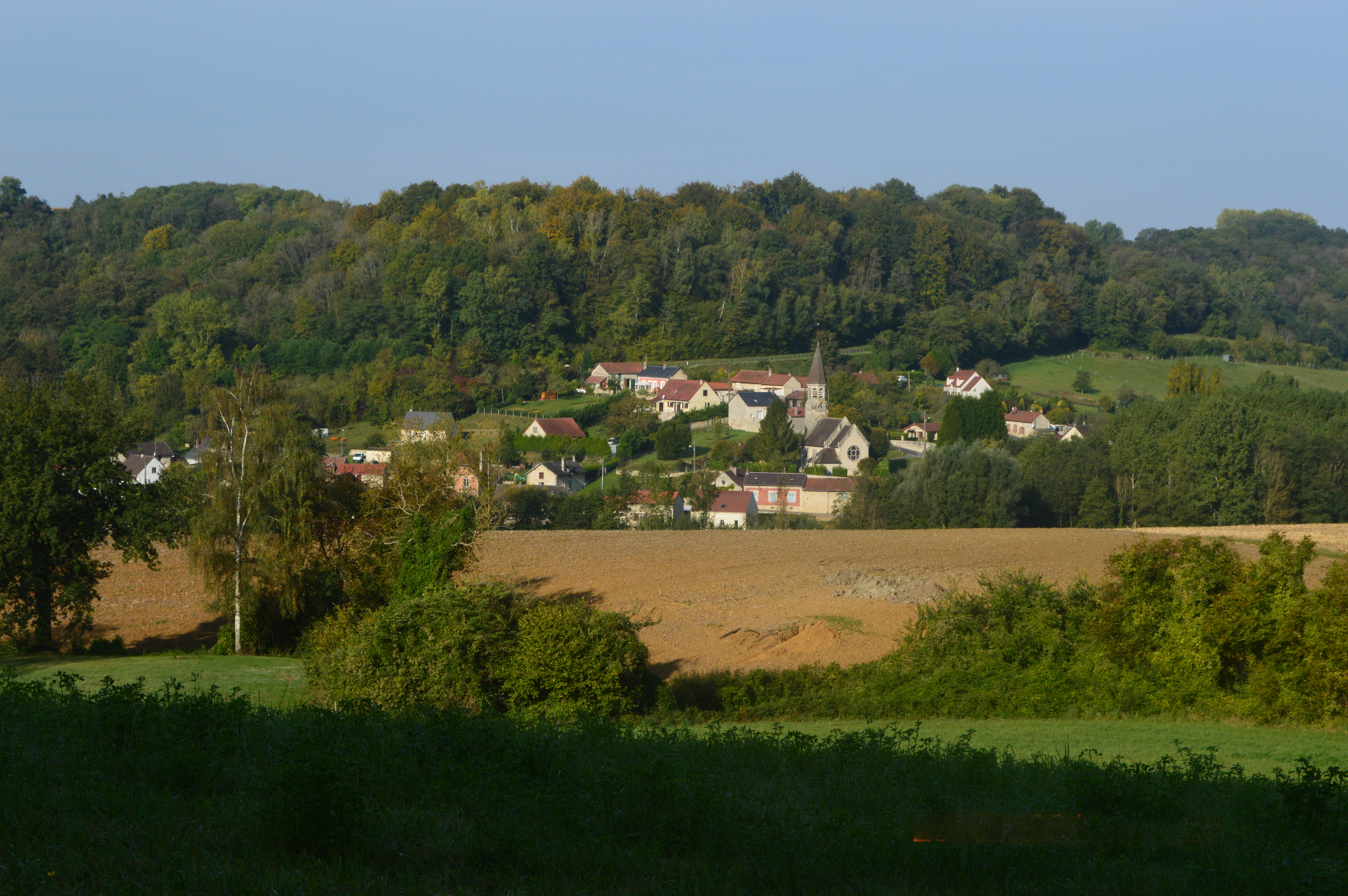
- Location of Aizy-Jouy
- Location within France Location within Hauts-de-France
- Coordinates: 49°26′07″N 3°31′02″E
- Country: France
- Region: Hauts-de-France
- Department: Aisne
- Arrondissement: Soissons
- Canton: Fère-en-Tardenois
- Intercommunality: Val de l'Aisne

Government
  - Mayor (2026–32): Amadéo Neca
- Area^{1}: 14.63 km^{2} (5.65 sq mi)
- Elevation: 84 m (276 ft)
- Highest elevation: 195 m (640 ft)
- Lowest elevation: 56 m (184 ft)
- Population (2023): 306
  - Density: 20.9/km^{2} (54.2/sq mi)
- Time zone: UTC+01:00 (CET)
  - Summer (DST): UTC+02:00 (CEST)
- INSEE/Postal code: 02008 /02370
- ^{1} French Land Register data, which excludes lakes, ponds, glaciers > 1 km^{2} (0.386 sq mi or 247 acres) and river estuaries.

Aizy-Jouy (French pronunciation: [ɛzi ʒwi]) is a commune in the department of Aisne in the Hauts-de-France region of northern France.

== Geography ==
Aizy-Jouy is some 15 km north-east of Soissons and 20 km south-east of Laon. National Highway N2 from Soissons to Laon passes just north of the commune. The commune can be accessed by Highway D14 running south from the N2 continuing through the heart of the commune and the town continuing south to Vailly-sur-Aisne. Highway D15 branches from the D14 at the southern border of the commune and heads north-east through the eastern part of the commune and then to Pargny-Filain. There are also several small country roads criss-crossing the commune and exiting on all sides of the commune. There are no villages or hamlets in the commune other than Aizy-Jouy.

A stream rises from ponds north of the town and flows south through the commune joining with other streams rising in the north-east of the commune and flowing south to the river Aisne. The commune has a substantial amount of forest mostly following the course of the streams with the rest of commune (about 30%) farmland.

== History ==
In 1972, the two towns of Aizy and Jouy merged to form Aizy-Jouy after the edict of the préfecture dated 24 January 1972.

== Administration ==
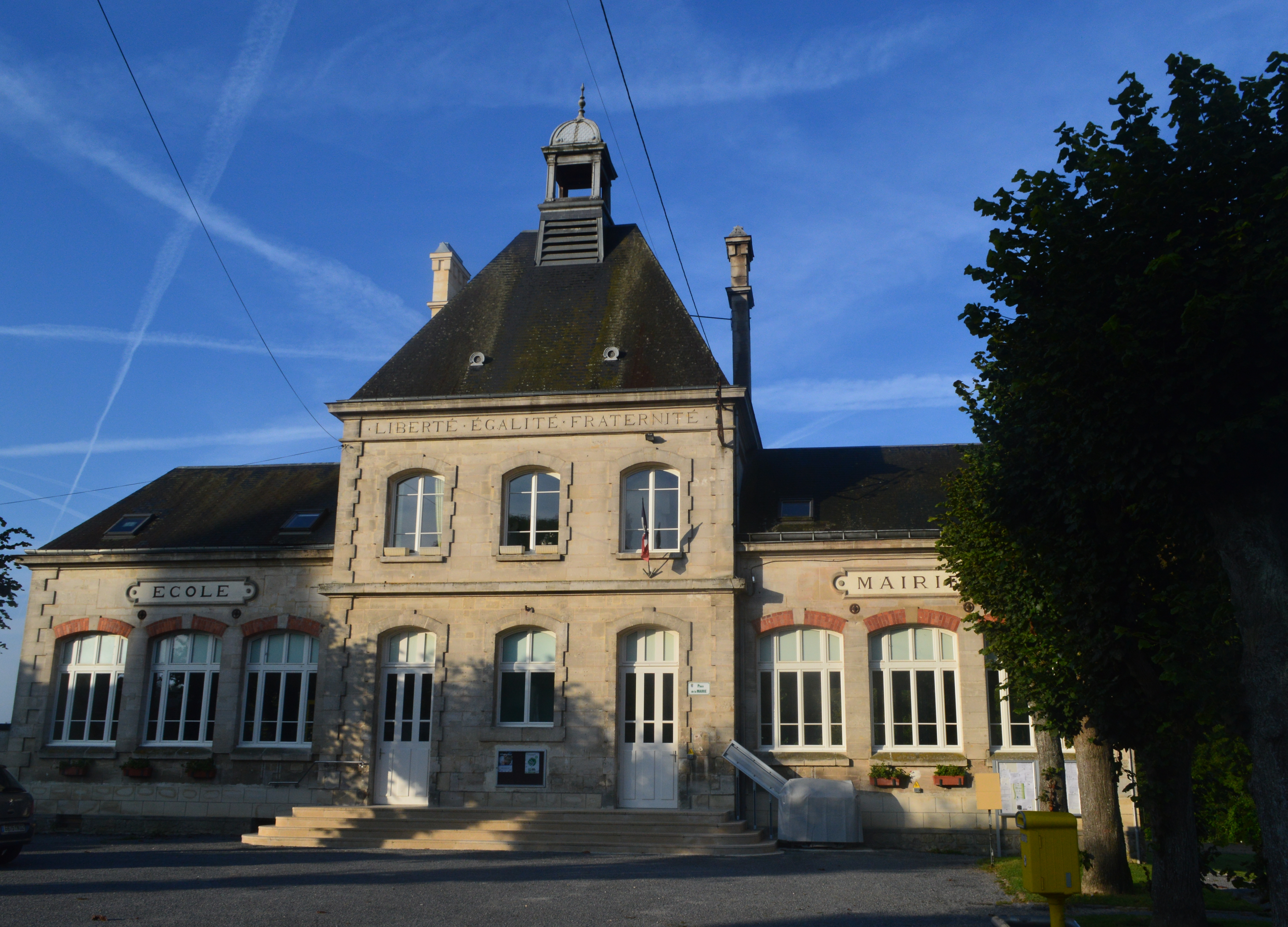
The Town Hall

List of Mayors of Aizy-Jouy

From	To	Name	Party
2001	2008	Éric De Wulf	DVD
2008	2014	Yannick Lecluze	
2014	2020	Éric De Wulf	DVD
2020	Present	Amadéo Neca	

== Population ==
Before 1971 the communes of Aizy and Jouy were separate and their population was counted separately. In 1954, Aizy had 242 inhabitants and Jouy 140.

Historical population
Year	Pop.	±% p.a.
1968	301	—
1975	232	−3.65%
1982	206	−1.68%
1990	230	+1.39%
1999	242	+0.57%
2007	259	+0.85%
2012	298	+2.85%
2017	291	−0.47%
2023	306	+0.84%
Source: INSEE

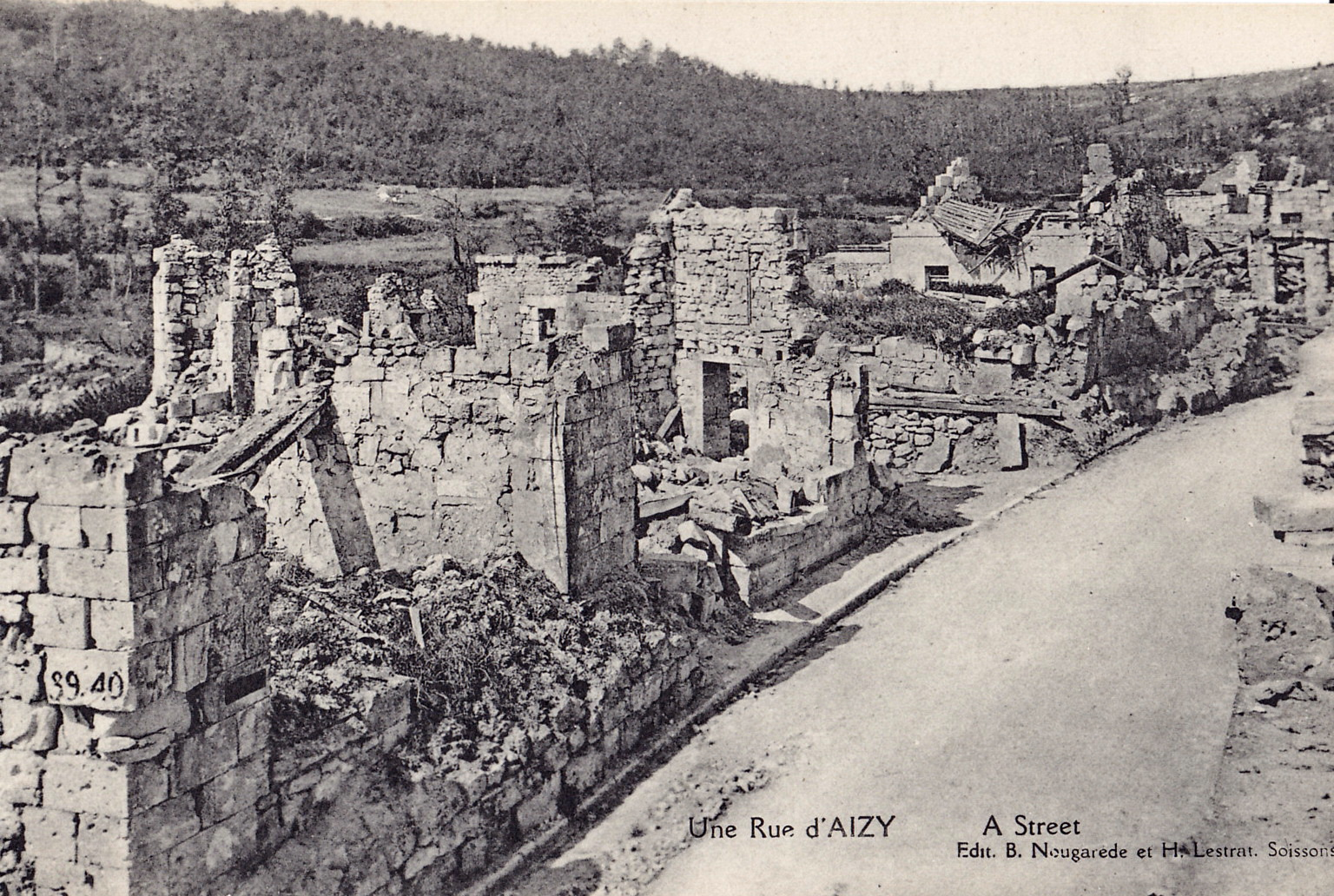
A street in Aizy in 1920

== Culture and heritage ==
=== Civil heritage ===
The commune has a number of buildings and structures that are registered as historical monuments:

- A House at 2 Impasse des Anges (20th century)
- A House at 1 Rue des Anges (20th century)
- A House at 4 Rue des Anges (20th century)
- A Town Hall / School at 7 Rue de Chavignon (1927)
- A House at 8 Rue de Chavignon (20th century)
- A House at 1 Rue du Chateau (20th century)
- A House at 1 Place du Clos-Rubut (20th century)
- A House at 1 Impasse Denne (20th century)
- A House at 1 Rue du Guet (20th century)
- A House at 2 Rue du Guet (20th century)
- A House at 5 Rue d'Hameret (20th century)
- A House at 7 Rue d'Hameret (20th century)
- A Town Hall / School at the Place de la Mairie (20th century)
- A House at 1 Rue du Moulin (20th century)
- The Creute du Caid (Note: The term "Creute" means "quarry" in the local dialect.) (Quarry) (1917).
- The Quarry Carvings (1917) The Creute du Caid operated for a century and a half and was occupied by the belligerents during the First World War. They left some cave carvings - some of which are of high quality.
- Aizy-Jouy Village (20th century)
- The War Memorial (20th century)

=== Religious heritage ===
The commune has several religious buildings and structures that are registered as historical monuments:

- The Parish Church of Saint-Médard (12th century). The church has several items that are registered as historical objects:
  - The Tombstone of Claude Personne (1662)
  - The Tombstone of François de Hanot (1744)
  - Sculptures (13th century)
  - All objects in the Church
- The Parish Church of Saint-Bandry (1928). The church has several items that are registered as historical objects:
  - All objects in the Church
  - A Lectern (18th century)
  - A Baptismal font (13th century)
  - A Baptismal font (13th century)
- An Ancient Church (12th century). This church was destroyed during the First World War. Only the south gate remains.
- The Communal Cemetery at Le Toty (1926)
- The Communal Cemetery at Aizy (20th century)

=== Gallery of Historical Monuments ===
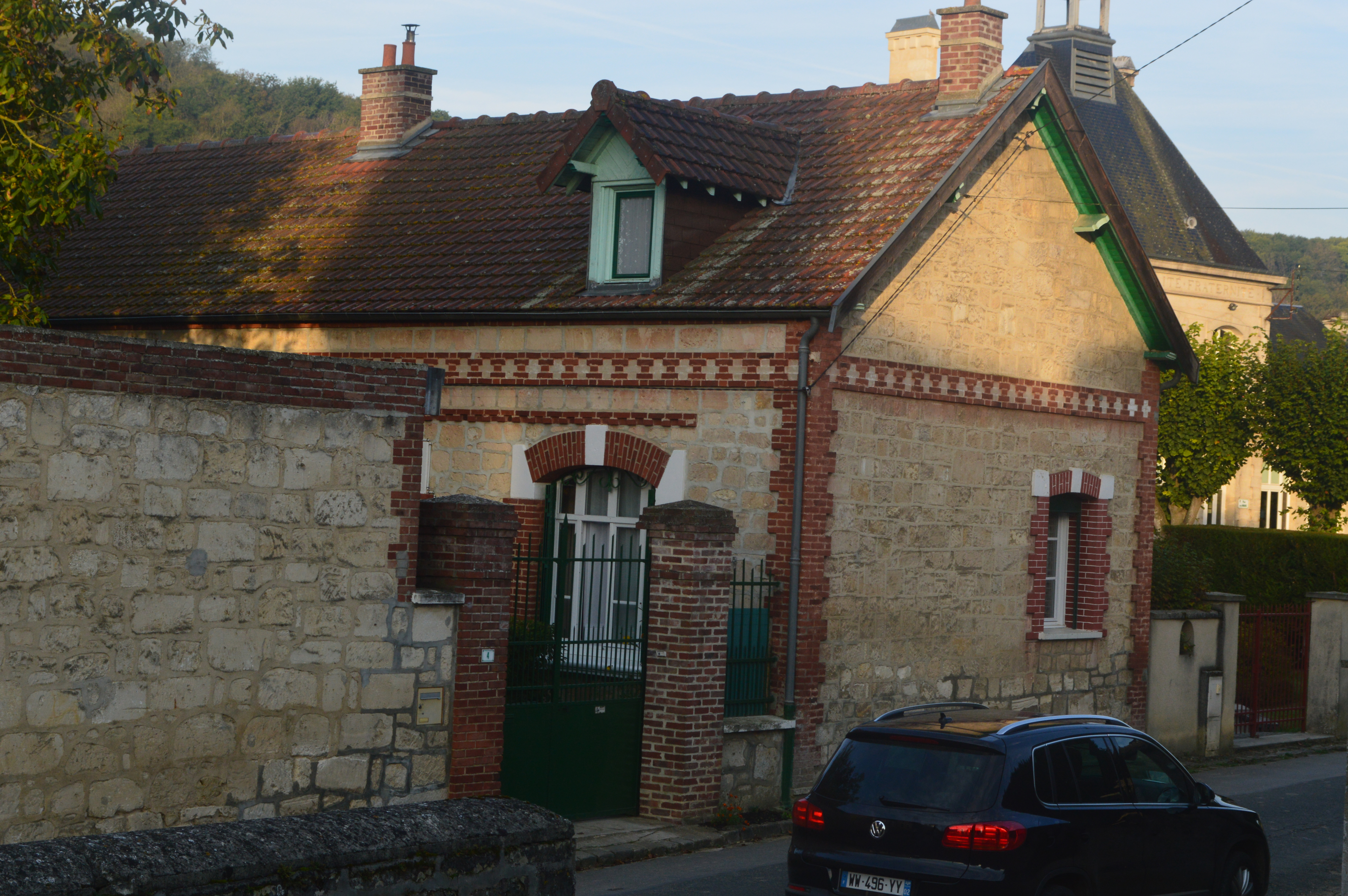
House at 4 Rue des Anges

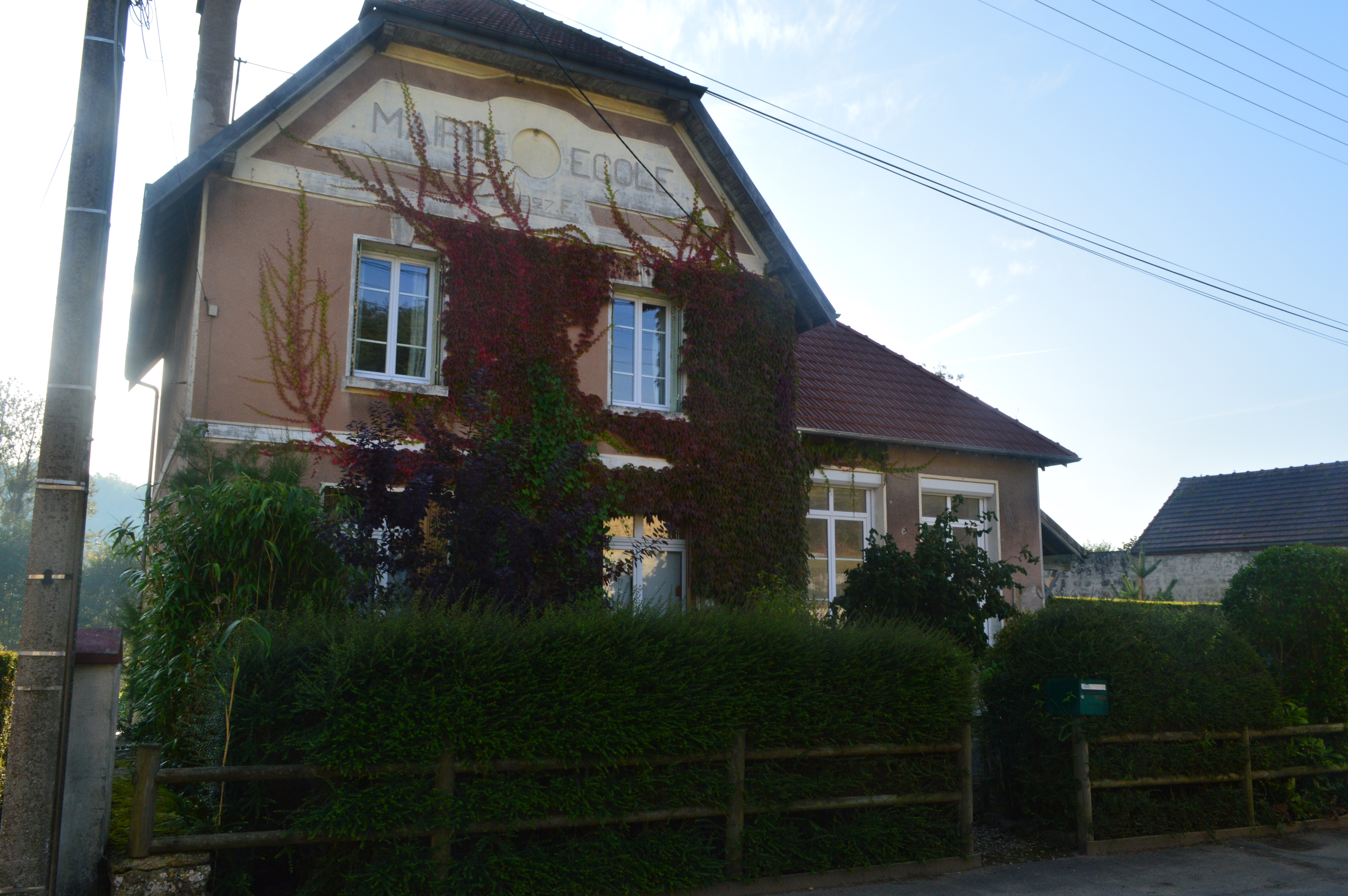
The old Town Hall at 7 Rue de Chavignon

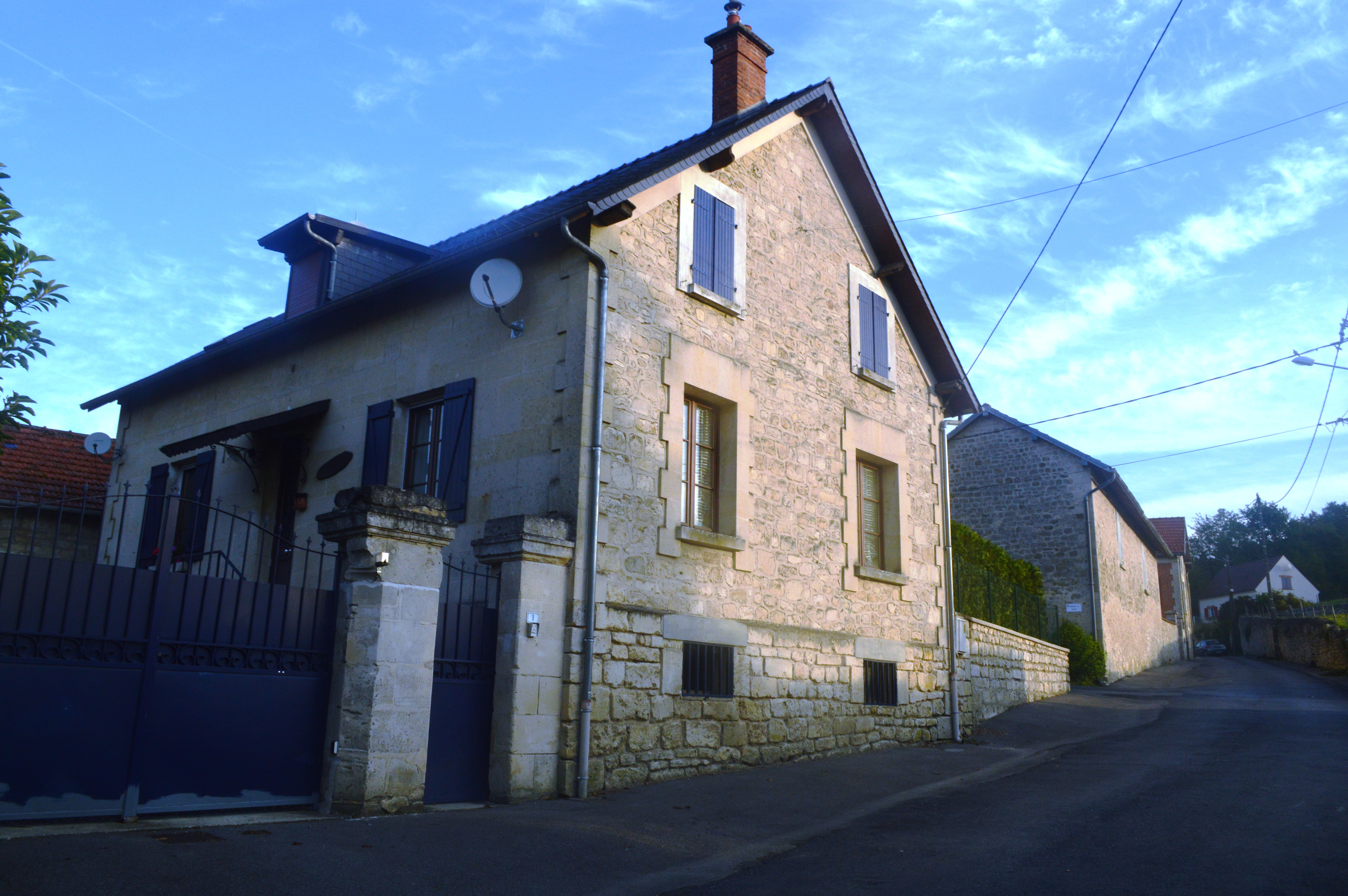
House at 1 Rue du Guet

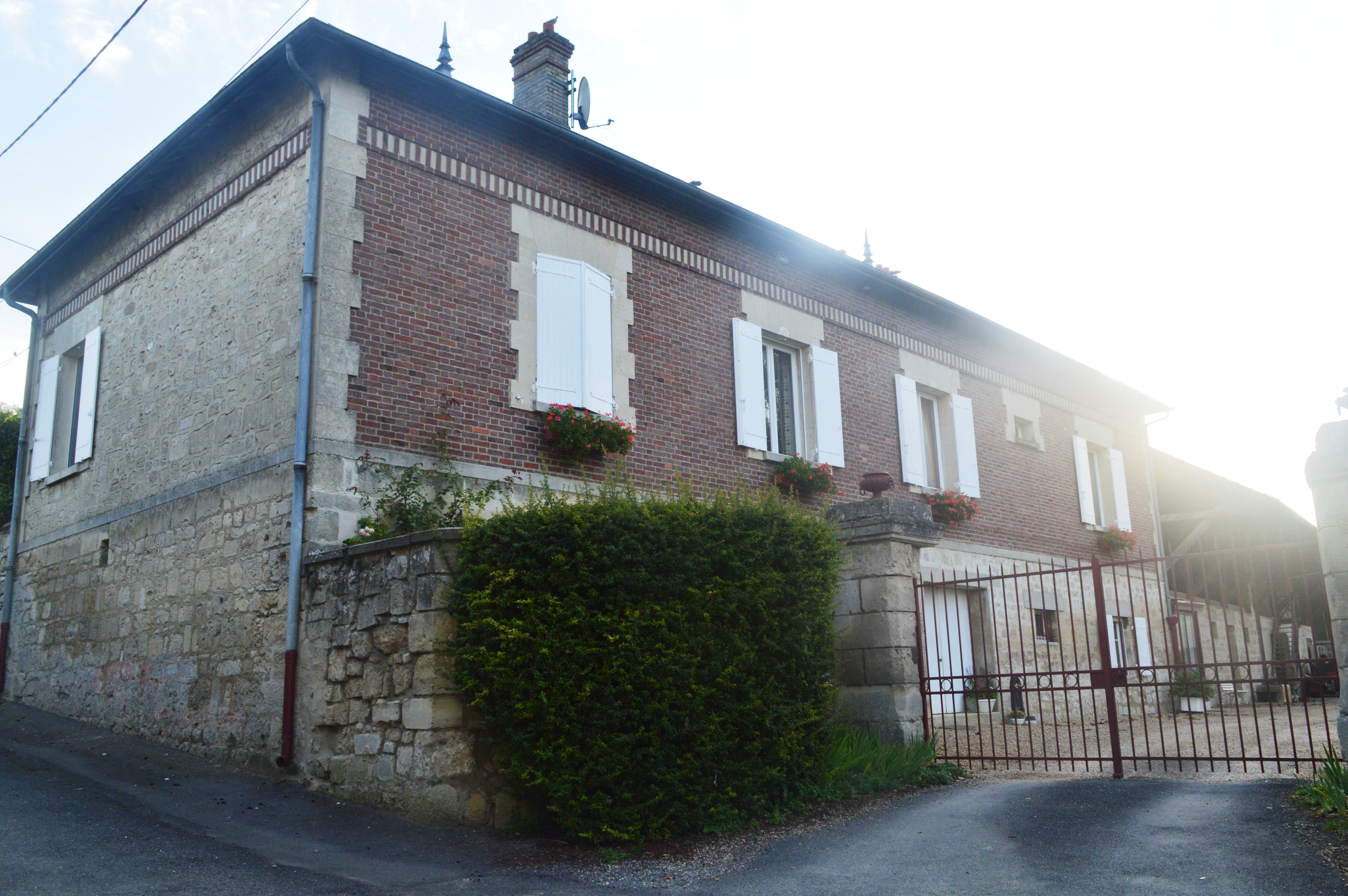
House at 2 Rue du Guet

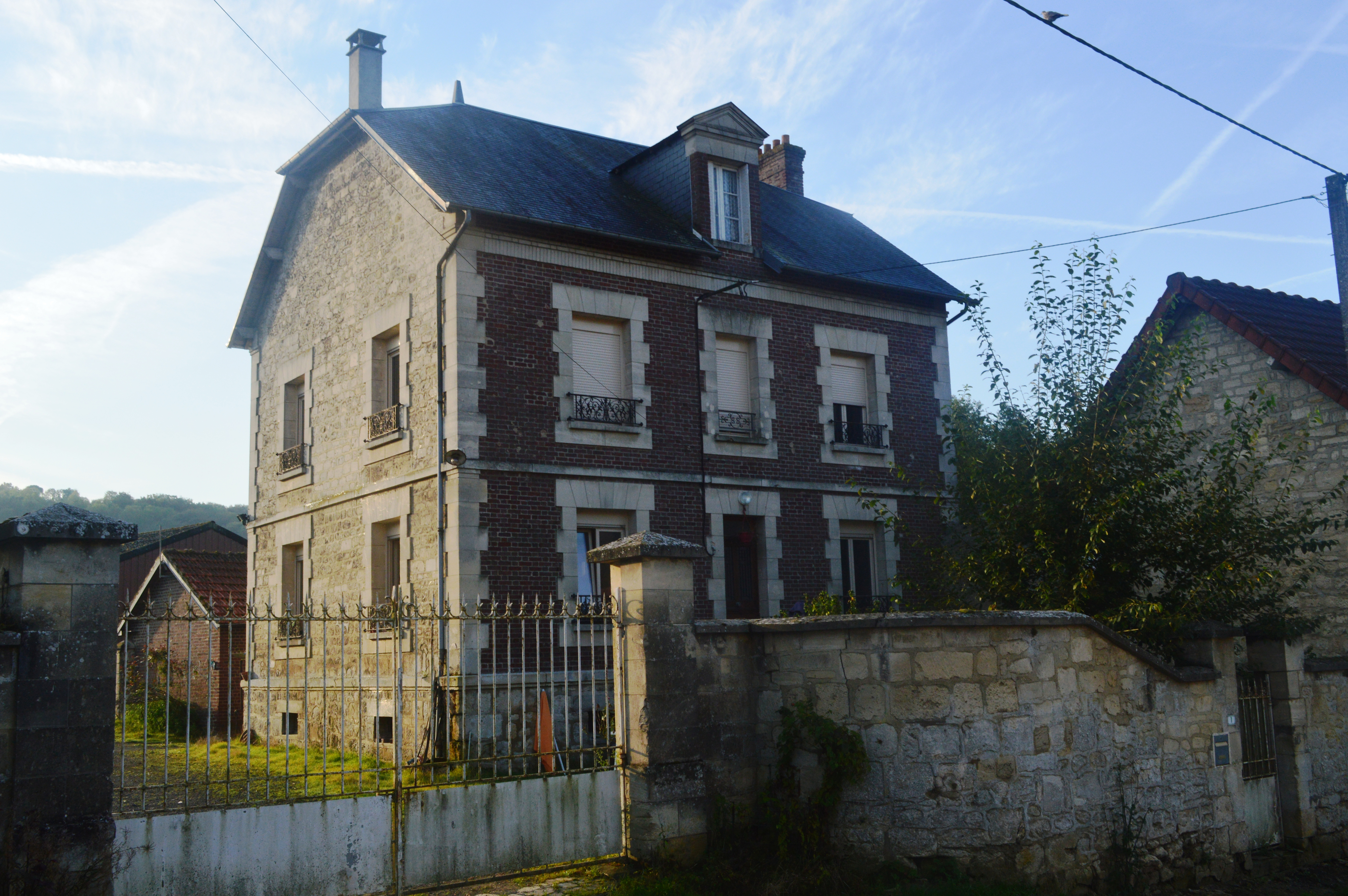
House at 1 Rue du Moulin

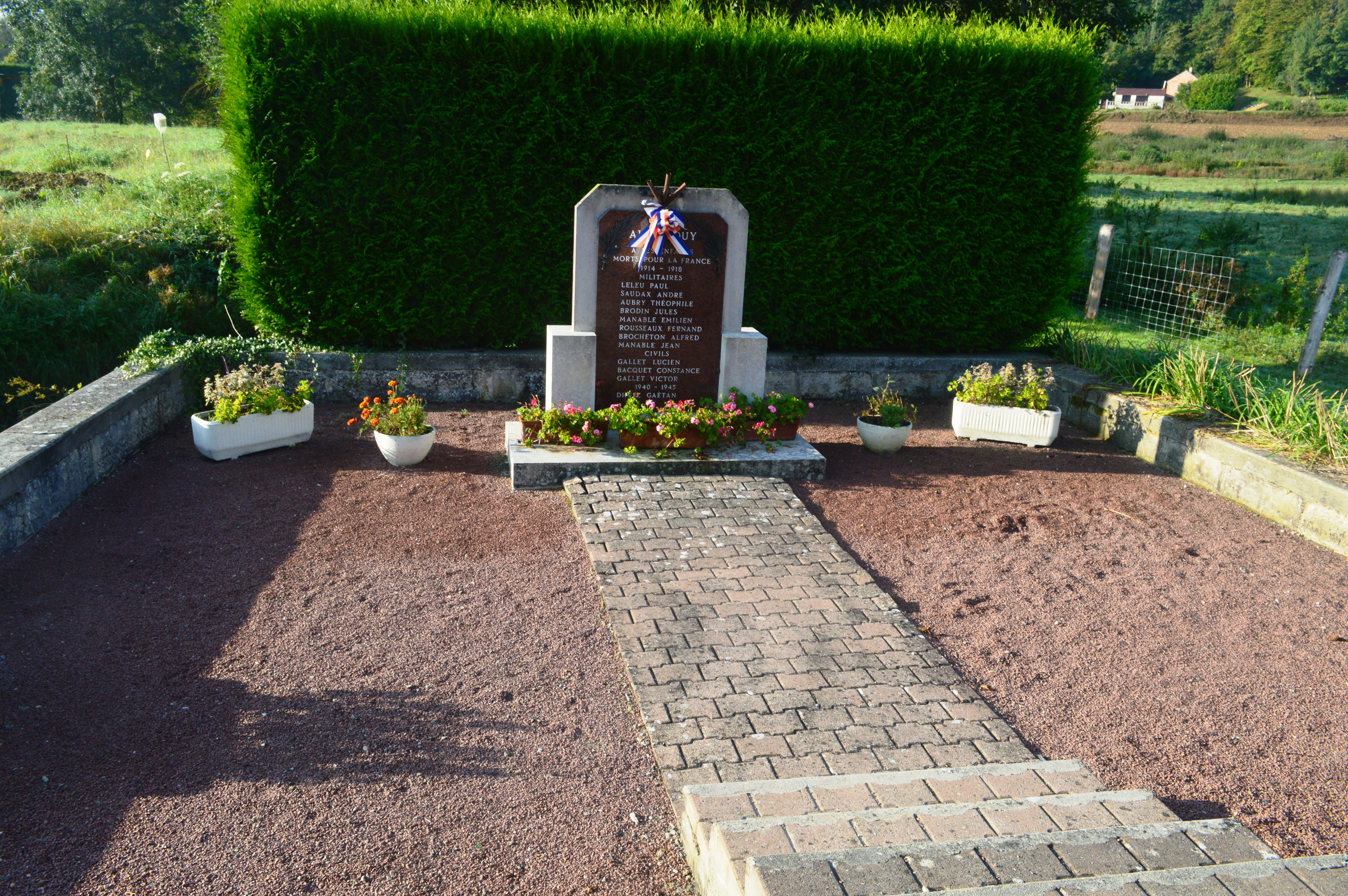
Aizy-Jouy War Memorial

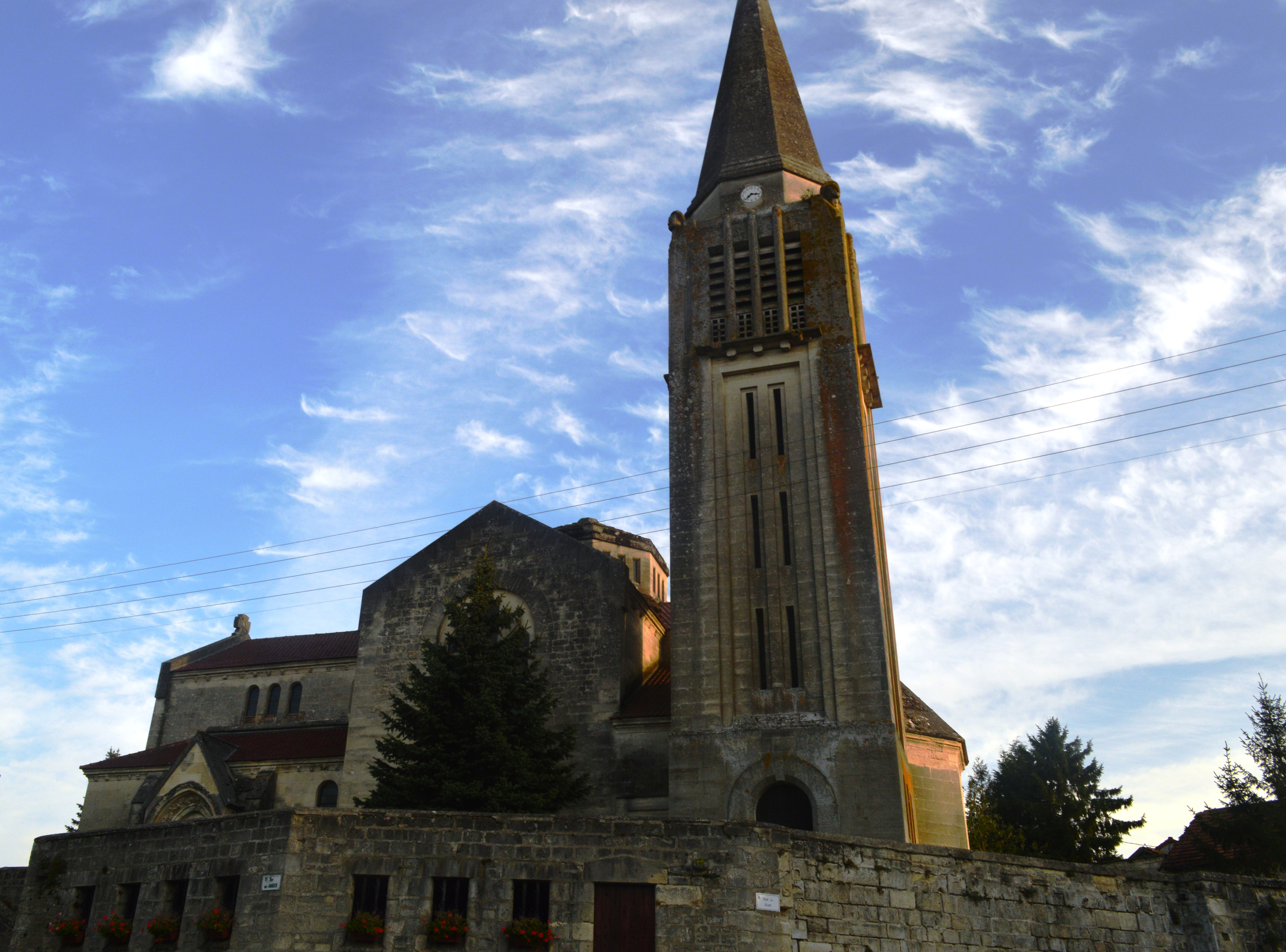
The Church of Saint-Médard

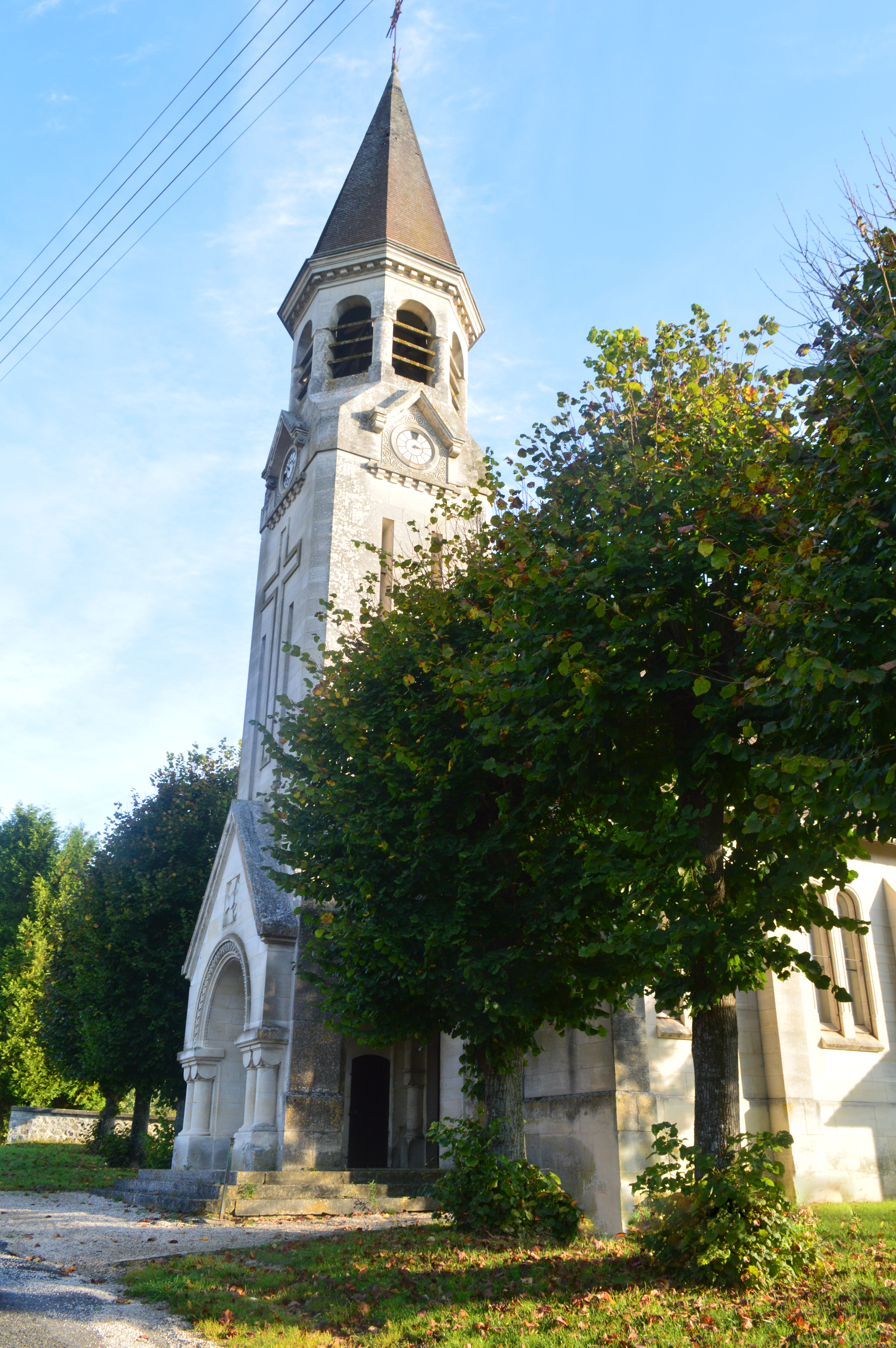
The Church of Saint Bandry

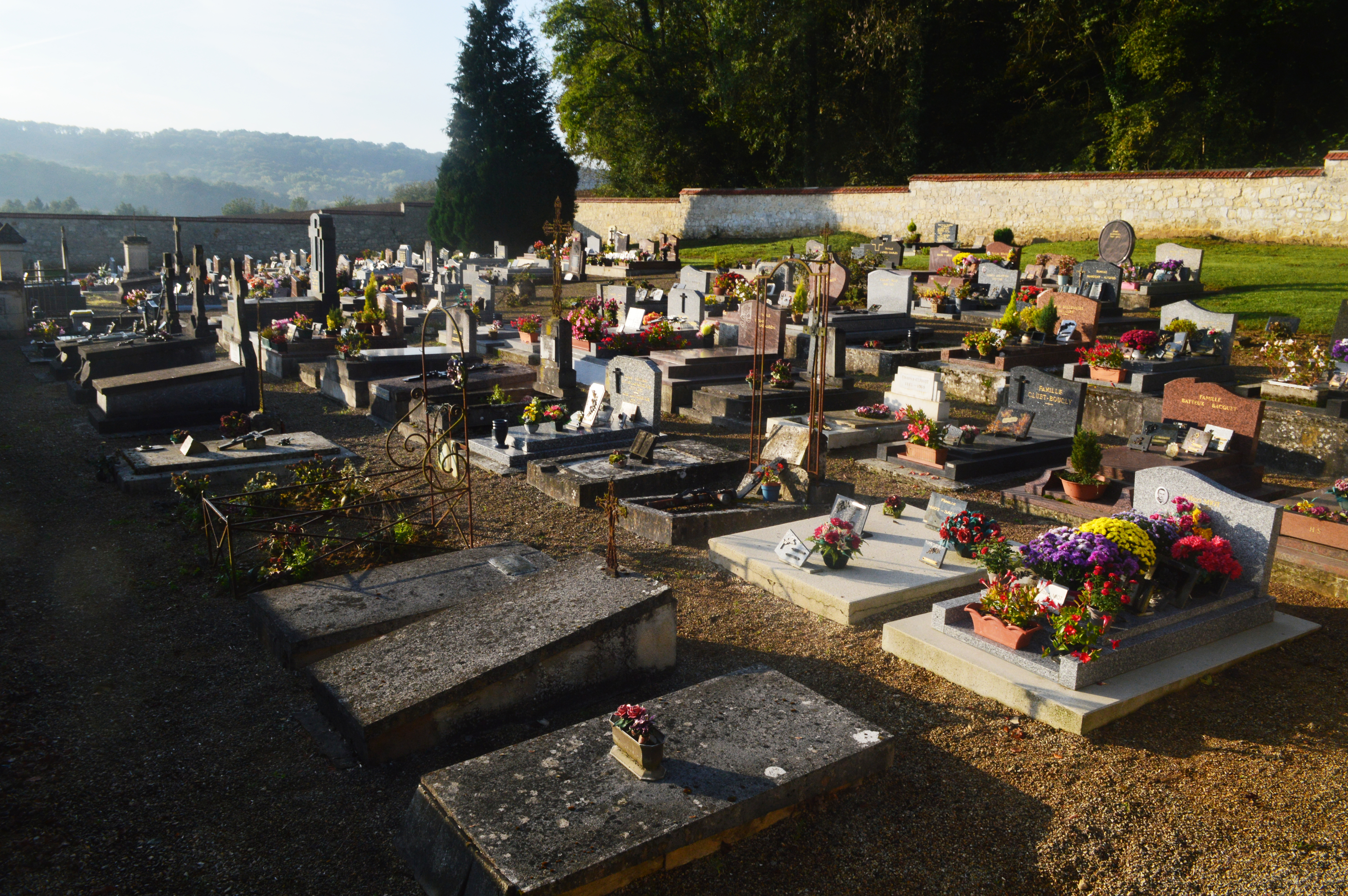
The Communal Cemetery at Aizy

== See also ==
- Communes of the Aisne department
