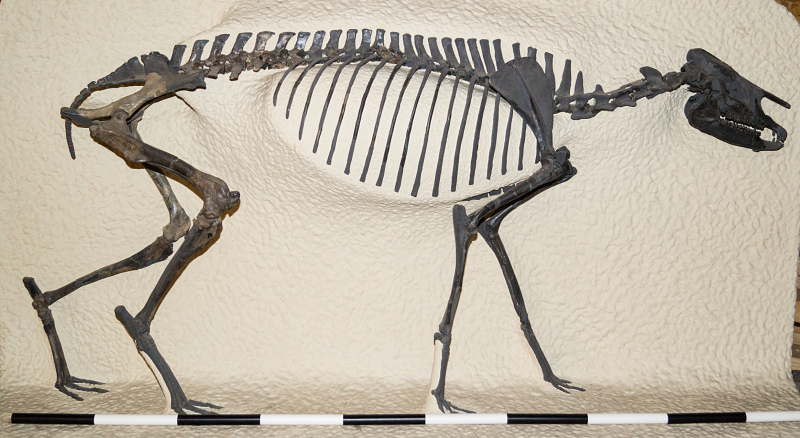
- H. nanus skeleton

Scientific classification
- Kingdom: Animalia
- Phylum: Chordata
- Class: Mammalia
- Order: Perissodactyla
- Family: †Helaletidae
- Genus: †Helaletes; Marsh, 1872
- Species: †H. nanus

Binomial name
- †Helaletes nanus Marsh, 1871

= Helaletes =

Helaletes Temporal range: Early Eocene

Extinct genus of mammals

Helaletes is a genus of an extinct perissodactyls closely related to tapirs. Fossils have been found in North America.

== Taxonomy ==
The type species of Helaletes, H. nanus, is known from Bridgerian-age fossils in the western US. Desmatotherium mongoliensis was previously referred to Helaletes, but Bai et al. (2017) found it distantly related to the H. nanus type species, while excluding the nominal species H. medius Qiu, 1987 from Helaletidae.

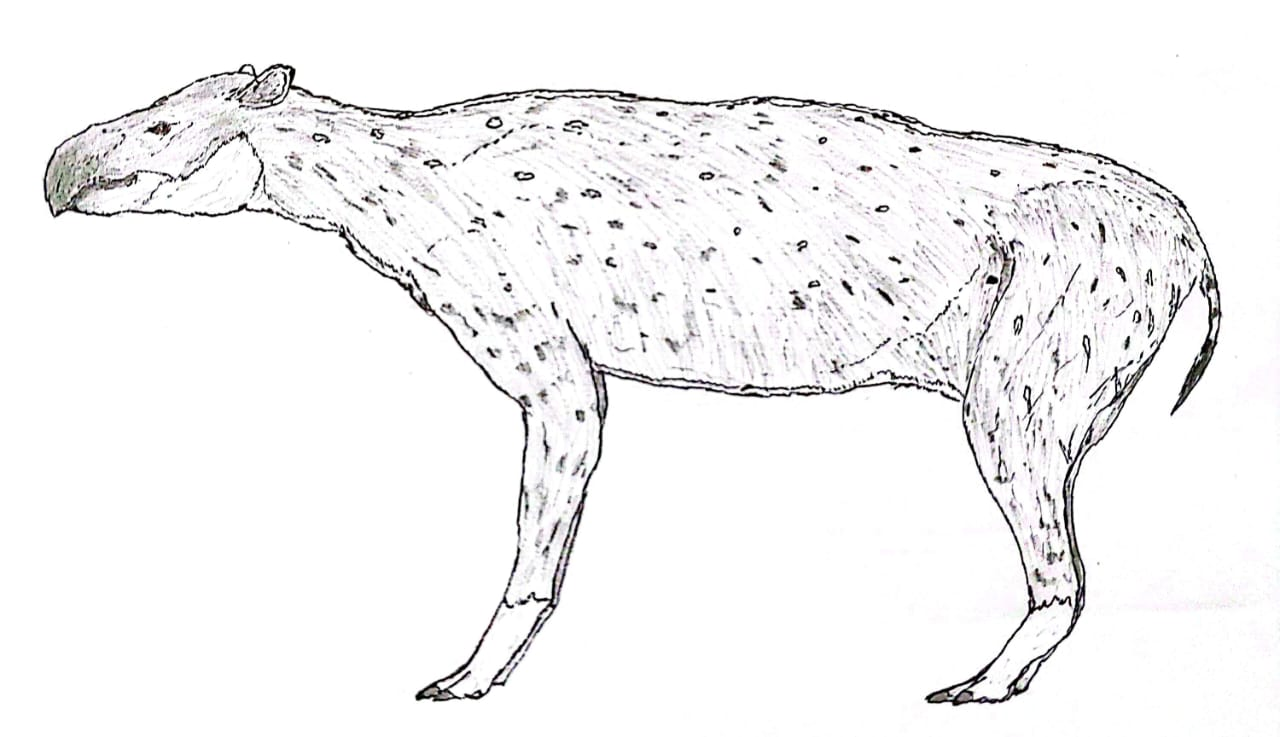
Restoration of Helaletes nanus
