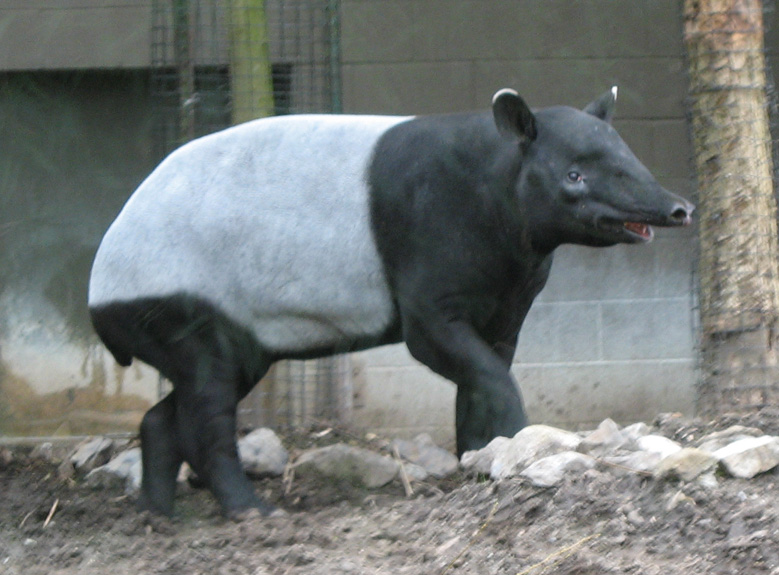
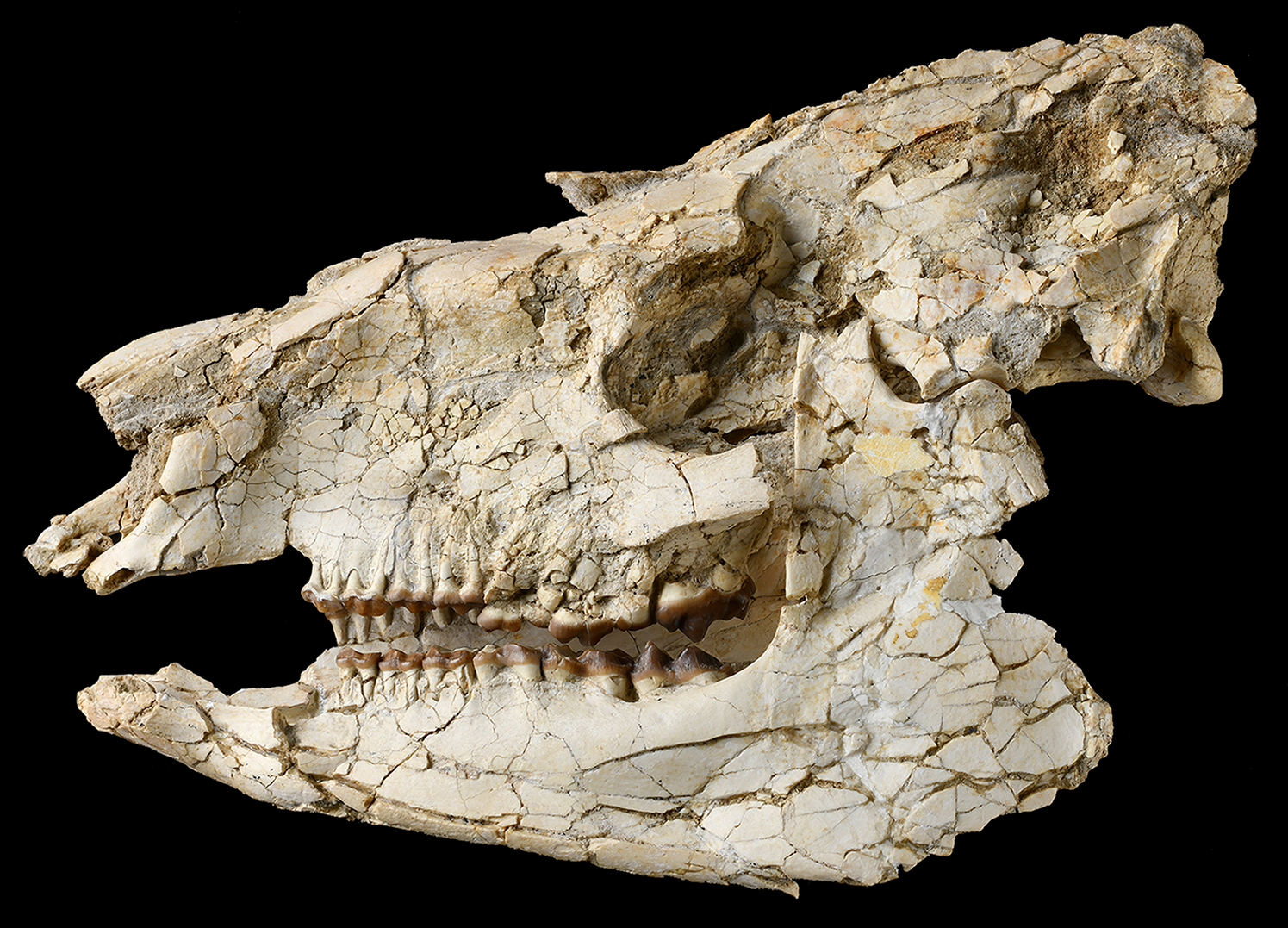
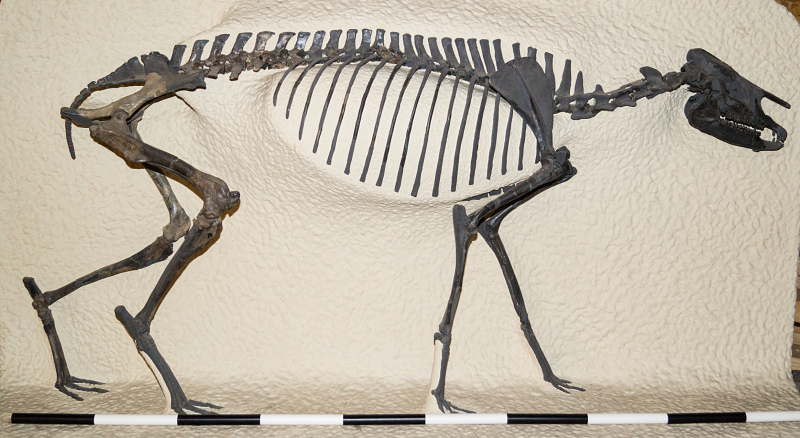
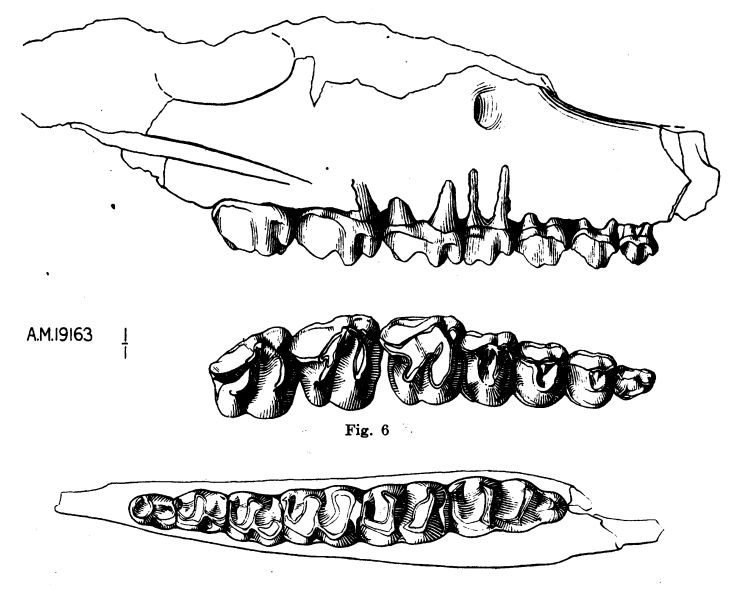
- Malayan tapir (Tapiridae) Irenolophus (Deperetellidae) Helaletes (Helaletidae) Lophialetes (Lophialetidae)

Scientific classification
- Kingdom: Animalia
- Phylum: Chordata
- Class: Mammalia
- Order: Perissodactyla
- Clade: Tapiromorpha
- Suborder: Ceratomorpha
- Superfamily: Tapiroidea; Gill, 1872

Families
- †Deperetellidae; †Helaletidae; †Lophialetidae; Tapiridae; Incertae sedis genera: †Cambaylophus

= Tapiroidea =

Tapiroids Temporal range: Eocene–Recent

Superfamily of mammals

Tapiroidea is a superfamily of perissodactyls which includes the living tapirs and their extinct relatives. Tapiroids represent one of the oldest living lineages of large mammals. Their closest living relatives are rhinoceroses; the ancestral lineages of tapirs and rhinoceroses split from each other approximately 51–47 million years ago. Once a large group encompassing several families, tapiroids are today represented only by the four living species of the genus Tapirus. All living species are listed as endangered or vulnerable on the IUCN Red List.

== Fossil record ==
The fossil record of tapiroids stretches back to the Early Eocene. Out of the three extant perissodactyl lineages, tapirs have the poorest and least well understood fossil record. Most tapiroids appear to have been relatively conservative, unlike the diversity seen in equoids and rhinocerotoids. Both ancient and modern tapirs appear to have inhabited closed-canopy warm forests.

Tapiroids were numerous and widespread in the Eocene in both North America and Asia, and is represented by several taxa in the Oligocene of both North America and Europe. Tapiroid diversity declined sharply after the Oligocene. Tapiridae first appeared during the early Oligocene in Europe, and may have originated from the tapiroid family Helaletidae.
