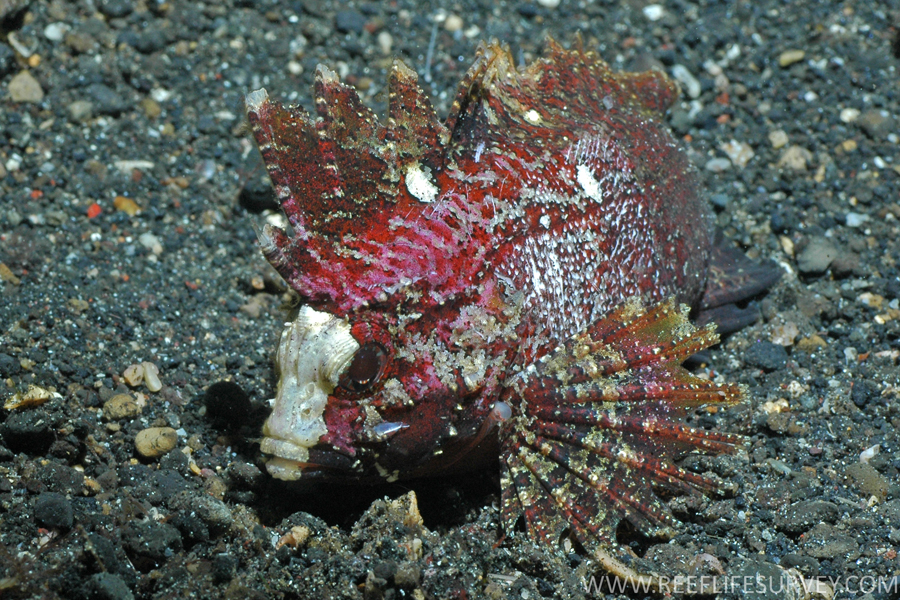

Conservation status
- Least Concern (IUCN 3.1)

Scientific classification
- Kingdom: Animalia
- Phylum: Chordata
- Class: Actinopterygii
- Order: Perciformes
- Family: Synanceiidae
- Genus: Paracentropogon
- Species: P. longispinis

Binomial name
- Paracentropogon longispinis (G. Cuvier, 1829)

Synonyms
- Apistus longispinis G. Cuvier, 1829; Paracentropogon longispinus (Cuvier, 1829); Centropogon indicus F. Day, 1875

= Paracentropogon longispinis =

Species of fish

Paracentropogon longispinis, the wispy waspfish, sailfin waspfish, whiteface waspfish or whiteface roguefish, is a species of marine ray-finned fish, a waspfish belonging to the subfamily Tetraroginae, which is classified as part of the family Scorpaenidae, the scorpionfishes and their relatives. It is found in the central Indo-West Pacific. It is the type species of the genus Paracentropogon.

== Taxonomy ==
Paracentropogon longispinis was first formally described as Apistis longispinis in 1829 by the French zoologist Georges Cuvier with its type locality given as Ambon Island. When Pieter Bleeker described the genus Paracentropogon he designated A. longispinis as its type species. Some authorities consider it likely that P. vespa is a junior synonym of P. longispinis. The specific name longispinis means "long spined" and refers to the longer spines on this species head that Ablabys taenianotus which was thought to be its congener when Cuvier named it.

== Descriptions ==
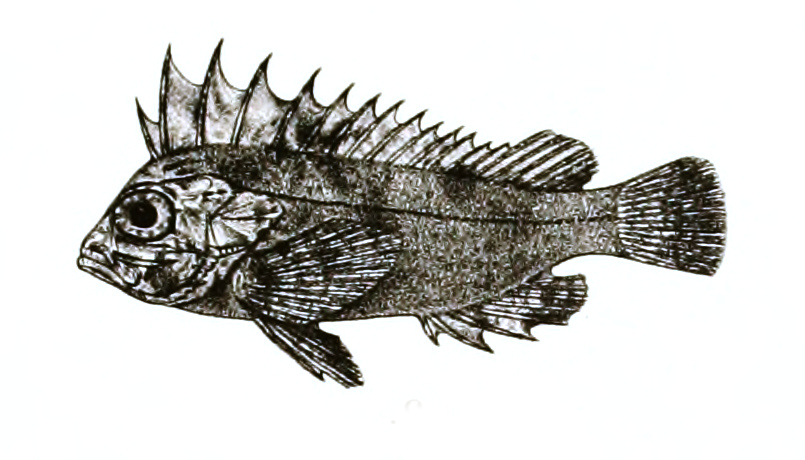

Paracentropogon longispinis has a laterally compressed body. There are 12-15 spines and 7 or 8 soft rays in its dorsal fin while the anal fin has 2 spines and 5 soft rays. The dorsal fin has its origin in the intraorbital area the membranes between the spines are deeply notched. There is a pair of large rear pointing spines over the mouth, these may not be clearly visible as they can be folded away. The lateral line has obvious tube scales. There are geographical differences in color, with specimens from the Gulf of Thailand typically being marked with large blotches over the body while those from Indonesia and Australia are generally less clearly marked. They have been observed changing color in captivity. This species attains a maximum standard length of 13 cm (5.1 in).

== Distribution ==
Paracentropogon longispinis is found in the central Indo-Pacific region. Its range extends from southern India, Thailand, and Malaysia through Indonesia to western, northern, and eastern Australia.

== Habitat, behavior, and diet ==
Paracentropogon longispinis is found at depths from 2 to 60 ft on sandy, silty, muddy, or rubble bottoms, and also in fields of Zosteraceae. It is a nocturnal benthic species, an ambush predator, feeding by hunting from a hide by mimicking a crumpled, dead leaf or a drifting piece of seaweed. It feeds on shrimps and other tiny crustaceans which it sucks into its mouth.
