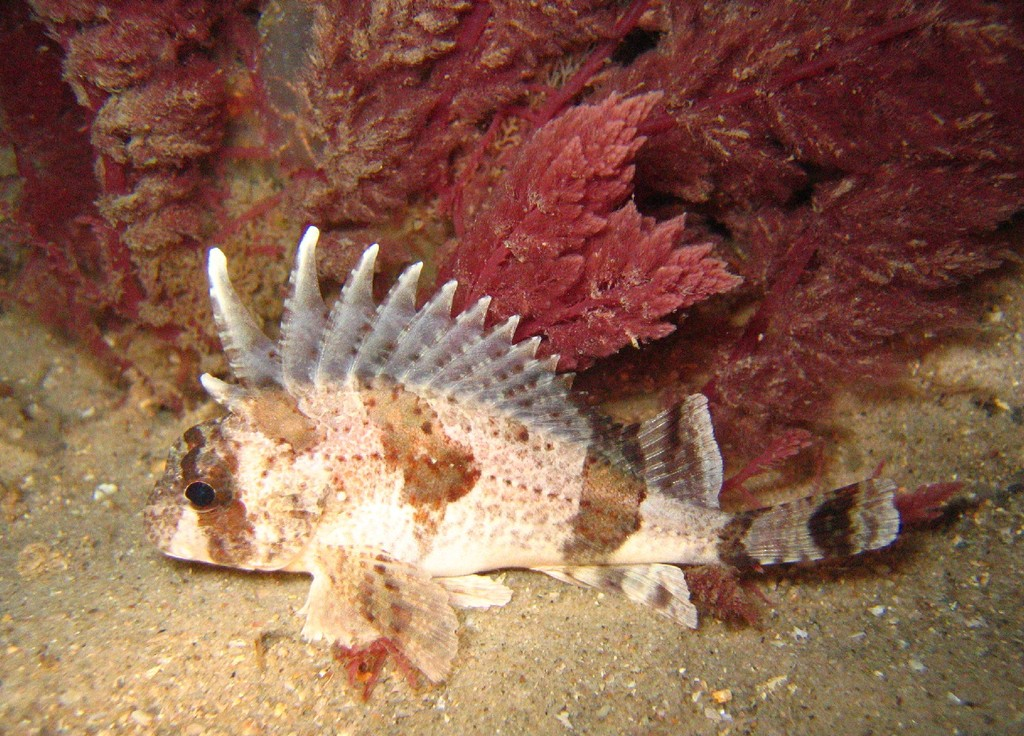

Scientific classification
- Kingdom: Animalia
- Phylum: Chordata
- Class: Actinopterygii
- Order: Perciformes
- Family: Synanceiidae
- Genus: Centropogon
- Species: C. australis

Binomial name
- Centropogon australis (Shaw ex White, 1790)

Synonyms
- Cottus australis Shaw ex White, 1790; Scorpaena jacksoniana Quoy & Gaimard, 1824; Tetraroge bellona De Vis, 1884; Tetraroge hamiltoni De Vis, 1884

= Eastern fortescue =

Species of fish

The Eastern fortescue (Centropogon australis), also known as the fortesque, Southern fortescue, fortie or Southern bullrout, is a species of ray-finned fish, a waspfish belonging to the subfamily Tetraroginae of the family Scorpaenidae, the scorpionfishes and their relatives. It is found the coastal waters of eastern Australia.

== Taxonomy ==
The Eastern fortescue was first formally described as Cottus australis in 1790 by the English biologist George Shaw in John White's Journal of a voyage to New South Wales. In 1829 Cuvier and Valenciennes placed this taxon in the genus Apistus and in 1860 the Albert Günther created the genus Centropogon which included A. australis. In 1876 Pieter Bleeker designated it as the type species of Centropogon. The specific name australis means "southern".

== Description ==
The Eastern fortescue has 15 or 16 spines and 7 to 9 soft rays in the dorsal fin while the anal fin has 3 spines and 5 soft rays. The nasal bones have 2-3 spines and the supraocular ridge has 8–13 distinct, strong spines, The interorbital concave and is relatively deep. There is a covering of ctenoid scales except for a wide scaleless area above the lateral line which extends from the upper back of the head to underneath the spiny part of the dorsal fin. There is a large spine on either sie of the snout which the fish is able to project forwards. The overall colour is creamy to brown with darker irregular, vertical bars on the head and along the flanks. This species attains a maximum total length of 15 cm (5.9 in).

== Distribution and habitat ==
The Eastern fortescue is endemic to eastern Australia where it is found in temperate waters from Fraser Island in Queensland south to the estuary of the Powlett River in eastern Victoria. It is found at depths from 1 to 30 m (3 ft 3 in to 98 ft 5 in) in seagrass beds in estuaries and in beds of sponges on inshore reefs.

== Biology ==
The Eastern fortescue is very common in the spring when they are breeding. They are often encountered resting on the bottom in large numbers. The dorsal fin spines are very venomous and can inflict painful wounds.
