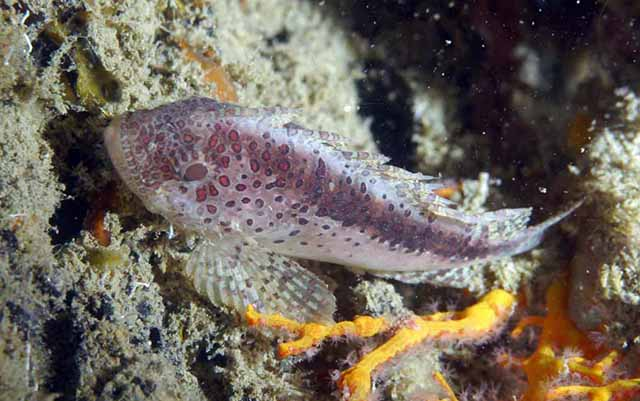
- Cottapistus cottoides

Scientific classification
- Kingdom: Animalia
- Phylum: Chordata
- Class: Actinopterygii
- Division: Teleostei
- Order: Perciformes
- Family: Synanceiidae
- Subfamily: Tetraroginae
- Genus: Cottapistus; Bleeker, 1876
- Species: C. cottoides

Binomial name
- Cottapistus cottoides (Linnaeus, 1758)

Synonyms
- Perca cottoides Linnaeus, 1758; Paracentropogon cynocephalus Weber, 1913; Paracentropogon scorpio Ogilby, 1910; Abcichthys scorpio (Ogilby, 1910); Cottapistus scorpio (Ogilby, 1910); Vadesuma scorpio (Ogilby, 1910)

= Marbled stingfish =

Genus of fishes

The marbled spinefish (Cottapistus cottoides), also known as the yellow waspfish, is a species of ray-finned fish, a waspfish belonging to the subfamily Tetraroginae of the family Scorpaenidae, the scorpionfishes and their relatives. It is the only species in the monotypic genus Cottapistus. This species is found in the Indo-West Pacific.

== Taxonomy ==
The marbled stingfish was first formally described as Perca cottoides in 1758 by Carl Linnaeus in the 10th edition of his Systema Naturae. Linnaeus did not give a type locality but it is thought to be the East Indies. In 1876 Pieter Bleeker classified this species within the monotypic genus Cottapistus and it remains the only species in that genus. This genus is included in the subfamily Tetraroginae in the 5th edition of Fishes of the World however other authorities place that subfamily within the stonefish family Synanceiidae, while other authorities classify this subfamily as a family in its own right. The genus name combines the sculpin genus Cottus with the genus Apistus, which this species had been placed in, while the specific name, cottoides, also refers to the sculpin-like appearance of this species.

== Description ==
The marbled spinfish has an oblong and strongly compressed body which has a depth of between one third and four fifths of its standard length. The front part of the body has no scales above the operculum. The space between the eyes is broad and the caudal fin is rounded. The origin of the dorsal fin is clearly in front of the rear margin of the orbit and it is continuous with, between 14 and 16 spines while the pelvic fins have a single spine and five soft rays. They are usually brownish on the upper body and whitish below, with a large number of dark spots on the head, body and fins, although the pelvic fin has no spots. The maximum standard length reached by theis species is 9.2 cm (3.6 in).

== Distribution and habitat ==
The marbled stingfish is found in the western Pacific Ocean from China south to Australia where it extends south to Bowen in Queensland, however, it has only been recorded from Jolo in the Philippines. This species is found over soft bottoms at depths between 1 and 24 m (3 ft 3 in and 78 ft 9 in).

== Bycatch ==
The marbled stingfish is taken as bycatch in some shrimp trawl fisheries and fishermen have to take great care in removing them from nets because of the highly venomous spines.
