= Neocentropogon =

Scientific classification
- Kingdom: Animalia
- Phylum: Chordata
- Class: Actinopterygii
- Order: Perciformes
- Family: Synanceiidae
- Subfamily: Tetraroginae
- Genus: Neocentropogon; Matsubara, 1943

Type species
- Paracentropogon aeglefinus Weber, 1913

Synonyms
- Gadapistus de Beaufort, 1949

Genus of fishes

Neocentropogon is a poorly known genus of marine ray-finned fishes, waspfishes belonging to the subfamily Tetraroginae, which is classified as part of the family Scorpaenidae, the scorpionfishes and their relatives. The fishes in this genus are native to the Indian Ocean and the western Pacific Ocean.

== Taxonomy ==
Neocentropogon was first formally described as a genus in 1943 by the Japanese ichthyologist Kiyomatsu Matsubara, with Paracentropogon aeglefinus, which had been described in 1913 by the German born Dutch zoologist Max Carl Wilhelm Weber from various locations in Indonesia, designated as the type species of what as then considered to be a monotypic genus. This taxon is included in the subfamily Tetraroginae within the Scorpaenidae in the 5th edition of Fishes of the World however other authorities place that subfamily within the stonefish family Synanceiidae, while other authorities classify this subfamily as a family in its own right. The genus name combines neo which means "new" with the genus name Centropogon, which this genus appears similar to and the type species was originally classified within the genus Paracentropogon.

== Species ==
Six recognized species are in this genus:

- Neocentropogon aeglefinus (M. C. W. Weber, 1913) (onespot waspfish)
- Neocentropogon affinis (Lloyd, 1909)
- Neocentropogon japonicus Matsubara, 1943
- Neocentropogon mesedai Klausewitz, 1985
- Neocentropogon profundus (J. L. B. Smith, 1958)
- Neocentropogon trimaculatus W. L. Y. Chan, 1966 (threespotted waspfish)

== Characteristics ==
Neocentropogon wapfishes are characterised by having an oblique dorsal profile of the head, bodies which are covered in cycloid scales, teeth on the palatine and between 13 and 16 spines in the dorsal fin. The rearmost ray of the dorsal fin is connected to the uppermost ray of the caudal fin by a membrane. There is a single spine and 5 soft rays in the pelvic fin and the lowermost four rays of the pectoral fin are separated from the upper rays with their tips free of the basal membrane which connects them. The largest species is the threespotted waspfish (N. trimaculatus) which has a maximum published standard length of 81 cm (32 in), although most species are much smaller than this, having lengths of less than 20 cm (7.9 in).
