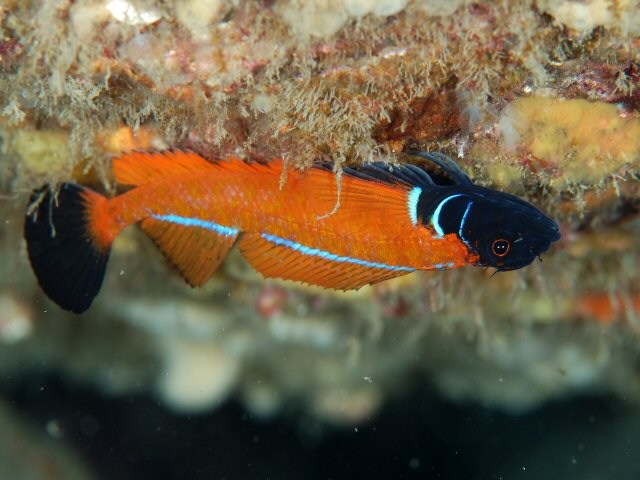

Conservation status
- Least Concern (IUCN 3.1)

Scientific classification
- Kingdom: Animalia
- Phylum: Chordata
- Class: Actinopterygii
- Order: Blenniiformes
- Family: Tripterygiidae
- Genus: Springerichthys
- Species: S. bapturus

Binomial name
- Springerichthys bapturus (Jordan & Snyder, 1902)

Synonyms
- Tripterygion bapturum Jordan & Snyder, 1902; Enneapterygius bapturus (Jordan & Snyder, 1902); Gracilopterygion bapturum (Jordan & Snyder, 1902)

= Japanese blacktail triplefin =

Species of fish

The Japanese blacktail triplefin (Springerichthys bapturus) is a species of triplefin blenny in the genus Springerichthys. It was described by David Starr Jordan and John Otterbein Snyder in 1902. This species is found in the western Pacific Ocean from southern Japan to Taiwan. It feeds on algae and the adults occur in rock pools and just below the low water mark.
