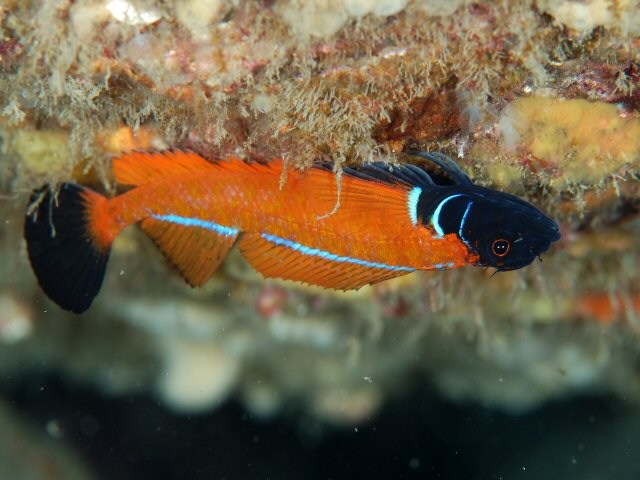
- Springerichthys bapturus

Scientific classification
- Kingdom: Animalia
- Phylum: Chordata
- Class: Actinopterygii
- Order: Blenniiformes
- Family: Tripterygiidae
- Subfamily: Tripterygiinae
- Genus: Springerichthys; Shen, 1994

Type species
- Tripterygion bapturum Jordan & Snyder 1902

Species
- See text

Synonyms
- Gracilopterygion Fricke 1994

= Springerichthys =

Genus of fishes

Springerichthys is a genus of triplefins in the family Tripterygiidae. The two species in this genus are found in the western Pacific Ocean.

== Taxonomy and characteristics ==
The genus is closely related to the genera Ceratobregma and Enneapterygius. The species in this genus are characterised by the possession of a discontinuous lateral line which comprises a series of 17-31 tubular pored scales at its anterior end and 13-21 notched scales in a series towards its posterior end. The belly is half covered in scales while the head is lacking in scales but it does have tiny spines in the occipital area. The first dorsal fin has three spines, the second dorsal fin has 11-19 spines while the anal fin has two fused spines and the pelvic fin has a single spine and two rays.

== Species ==
There are two species currently recognised in Springerichthys:

- Japanese blacktail triplefin, Springerichthys bapturus (Jordan & Snyder, 1902)
- Kulbicki's triplefin, Springerichthys kulbickii (Fricke & Randall, 1994)

== Etymology ==
The name of the genus, Springerichthys honours the American ichthyologist Victor G. Springer of the United States National Museum in recognition of his contribution to the systematics of the Blenniiformes.
