= Ocosia spinosa =

Scientific classification
- Kingdom: Animalia
- Phylum: Chordata
- Class: Actinopterygii
- Order: Perciformes
- Family: Synanceiidae
- Genus: Ocosia
- Species: O. spinosa

Binomial name
- Ocosia spinosa L. C. Chen, 1981

Species of fish

Ocosia spinosa, commonly known as the spine, stone dog, or stone fish, is a species of marine ray-finned fish, a waspfish belonging to the subfamily Tetraroginae, which is classified as part of the family Scorpaenidae, the scorpionfishes and their relatives. It is found in the western Pacific Ocean of Taiwan, with a depth of 288 meters. It is currently only found in Pingtung, which is located in southern Taiwan. The reason of its unique distribution is unknown.

Ocosia spinosa perches on the soft bottom of the edge of the continental shed and catches small fish and crustaceans with its use of camouflage and poisonous glands under its spines.

== Morphological characteristics ==
The body of Ocosia spinosa is long and laterally flat, and the front of the back is raised. The tear bone and the second eye have a spine; the front cap bone has four to five small spines. There are no scales on its body. The starting point of the dorsal fin extends to the top of the eye and the second spine is the longest and gradually becomes shorter. The body and fins are pink, and irregular spots with taupe are scattered on the head, body side and fins.

Some scholars incorporated this species into the former Tetrarogidae. But recent scholars have agreed to classify it as Scorpaenidae.
