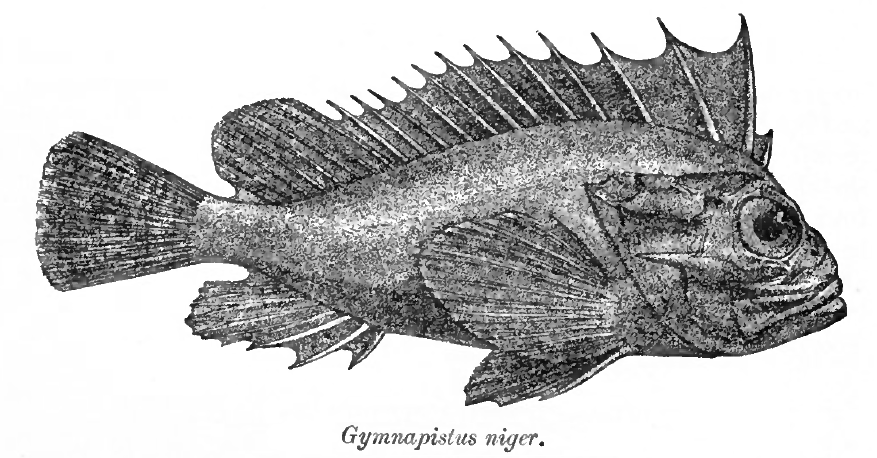
- T. niger

Scientific classification
- Kingdom: Animalia
- Phylum: Chordata
- Class: Actinopterygii
- Order: Perciformes
- Family: Synanceiidae
- Subfamily: Tetraroginae
- Genus: Tetraroge; Günther, 1860

Type species
- Apistus barbatus Cuvier, 1829

= Tetraroge =

Genus of fishes

Tetraroge is a genus of ray-finned fishes, waspfishes belonging to the subfamily Tetraroginae, which is classified as part of the family Scorpaenidae, the scorpionfishes and their relatives. These fishes are native to the Indian Ocean and the western Pacific Ocean.

== Taxonomy ==
Tetraroge was first described as a genus in 1860 by the German born British herpetologist and ichthyologist Albert Günther. In 1919 David Starr Jordan designated Apistus barbatus, which had been described by Georges Cuvier in 1829 from Java, as the type species of the genus. This genus is included in the subfamily Tetraroginae within the Scorpaenidae in the 5th edition of Fishes of the World however other authorities place that subfamily within the stonefish family Synanceiidae, while other authorities classify this subfamily as a family in its own right. The genus name Tetraroge combines tetra, which means "four", with rhogos, which means "clef", referring to the four clefts between the gill compared to 5 in Pentaroge, a synonym of Gymnapistes.

== Species ==
There are currently two recognized species in this genus:

- Tetraroge barbata (G. Cuvier, 1829) (Bearded roguefish)
- Tetraroge nigra (G. Cuvier, 1829) (Freshwater waspfish)

== Characteristics ==
Tetraroge waspfishes have largely naked bodies with no scales, there is a single spine and 5 fin rays in the pelvic fins and they have teeth on the palatine. The dorsal fin contains between 14 and 17 spines and has its origin to the front of the level of the rear margin of the orbit. The dorsal profile of the head is oblique, there are no tentacles on the eyes but there are papillae on the eyes, head and body, the lateral line is clearly separated from the base of the dorsal fin and the tip of the operculum does not extend as far back as the base of the dorsal fin. The largest species is T. nigra which has a maximum published total length of 13.5 cm (5.3 in) while the same measurement for T barbata is 10 cm (3.9 in).

== Distribution and habitat ==
Tetraroge waspfishes are found in the eastern Indian Ocean and western Pacific Ocean from India east to Fiji, north to Japan and south to New Guinea and New Caledonia. They are found in estuaries and mangroves and penetrate freshwaters in rivers by as much as 40 km (25 mi) from the coast.

== Biology ==
Tetraroge waspfishes are predators feeding on fishes and crustaceans. At least some of their fin spines are venom bearing.
