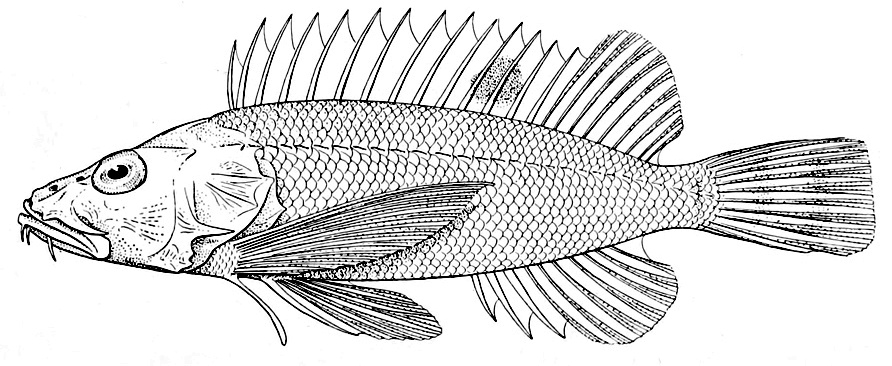

Scientific classification
- Kingdom: Animalia
- Phylum: Chordata
- Class: Actinopterygii
- Order: Perciformes
- Family: Synanceiidae
- Subfamily: Apistinae
- Genus: Apistops; J. D. Ogilby, 1911
- Species: A. caloundra

Binomial name
- Apistops caloundra (De Vis, 1886)

Synonyms
- Apistus caloundra De Vis, 1886

= Apistops =

Genus of fishes

Apistops is a monotypic genus of wasp scorpionfishes belonging to the subfamily Apistinae in the family Scorpaenidae, the scorpionfishes and their relatives. Its only species is the short-armed waspfish (Apistops caloundra), also known as the shortfinned waspfish or shortspine waspfish. This species is found in the Indian and Pacific waters from Papua New Guinea, the Arafura Sea and northwest Australia. It is a demersal fish found on the inshore area of the continental shelf at depths between 19 and 49 m (62 and 161 ft). This species grows to a length of 19 centimetres (7.5 in) SL.

Apistops was first described as a genus in 1911 by the Australian ichthyologist James Douglas Ogilby for Apistus caloundra, a species which had been described in 1886 by the English zoologist Charles Walter De Vis who gave the type locality as Caloundra in Queensland. The genus name Apistops means "lookong like Apistus, the genus it was originally placed in by De Vis and the specific name refers to the type locality.
