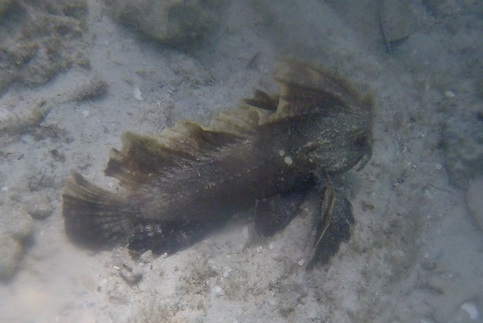

Conservation status
- Data Deficient (IUCN 3.1)

Scientific classification
- Kingdom: Animalia
- Phylum: Chordata
- Class: Actinopterygii
- Order: Perciformes
- Family: Synanceiidae
- Genus: Ablabys
- Species: A. binotatus

Binomial name
- Ablabys binotatus (Peters, 1855)

Synonyms
- Apistus binotatus Peters, 1855; Amblyapistus binotata (Peters, 1855); Amblyapistus binotatus (Peters, 1855); Amblyapistus marleyi Regan, 1919

= Ablabys binotatus =

Species of fish

Ablabys binotatus, the redskinfish, is a species of marine ray-finned fish, a waspfish belonging to the subfamily Tetraroginae of the family Scorpaenidae, the scorpionfishes and their relatives. This species is found in the Indian Ocean.

== Taxonomy ==
Ablabys binotatus was first formally described in 1855 as Apistus binotatus by the German naturalist and explorer Wilhelm Karl Hartwig Peters with the type locality given as Ibo in Mozambique. The specific name binotatus means "twice marked", presumed to be an allusion to the silvery-white spot on each flank on the lateral line, i.e. two spots.

== Description ==
Ablabys binotatus has 15 spines and 8 or 9 soft rays in the dorsal fin and 3 spines and 5 soft rays in the anal fin. It is dark brown in overall colour with a silvery botch on each side of the body above the pectoral fins and with some yellow or black markings. This species attains a maximum total length of 15 cm (5.9 in).

== Distribution and habitat ==
Ablabys binotatus is found in the western Indian Ocean where it has been confirmed to occur through specimen records in along the eastern coast of Africa in Mozambique and South Africa but reports from Zanzibar, Réunion, The Maldives, India and the Gulf of Oman are unconfirmed. It is found in subtidal, shallows among seaweed.

== Biology ==
Ablabys binotatus rocks back and forth in the current.

== Conservation status ==
Ablabys binotatus is a little known species and there is almost no data on its population and despite there being many reports in check-lists, there are very few specimens to confirm these sightings. This means that the actual distribution and population of this species are not known. The IUCN has therefore assessed this species as Data Deficient.
