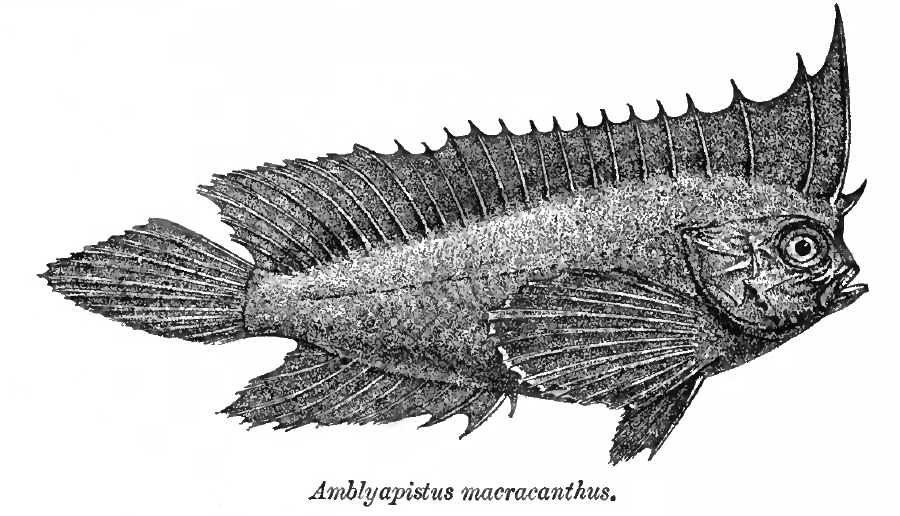

Conservation status
- Least Concern (IUCN 3.1)

Scientific classification
- Kingdom: Animalia
- Phylum: Chordata
- Class: Actinopterygii
- Order: Perciformes
- Family: Synanceiidae
- Genus: Ablabys
- Species: A. macracanthus

Binomial name
- Ablabys macracanthus (Bleeker, 1852)

Synonyms
- Apistus macracanthus Bleeker, 1852; Amblyapistus macracanthus (Bleeker, 1852)

= Ablabys macracanthus =

Species of fish

Ablabys macracanthus, also known as the spiny waspfish or as the spiny leaf-fish in Indonesia, is a species of marine ray-finned fish, a waspfish belonging to the subfamily Tetraroginae of the family Scorpaenidae, the scorpionfishes and their relatives. This species is found in the Western Pacific and Indian Oceans.

== Taxonomy ==
Ablabys macracanthus was first formally described in 1852 as Apistus macracanthus by the Dutch physician, herpetologist and ichthyologist Pieter Bleeker with the type locality given as Wahai, northern Ceram, Indonesia. The specific name macracanthus means "large thorn" or "large spine", Bleeker did not explain the allusion but it is presumed to be referring to the characteristic long dorsal fin spines of the genus Ablabys.

== Description ==
Ablabys macracanthus has 15 or 16 spines and between 8 and 10 soft rays in its dorsal fin while the anal fin has 3 spines and 7 or 8 soft rays.

== Distribution and habitat ==
Ablabys macracanthus is found in the eastern Indian Ocean from the Andaman Sea off Myanmar and Thailand into the western Pacific Ocean reaching east as far as the Philippines and south to New Guinea. It is found in shallow, inshore waters at depths of between 1 and 20 m (3 ft 3 in and 65 ft 7 in) in areas of sand or mud, estuaries and on coastal slopes. It lives at tropical latitudes (25 to 8 degrees north latitude).

== Biology ==
Ablabys macracanthus is harmless to humans. It can grow up to as long as 20 cm and it often sways with the current, mimicking a pile of leaves. This species attains a maximum total length of 20 cm (7.9 in).
