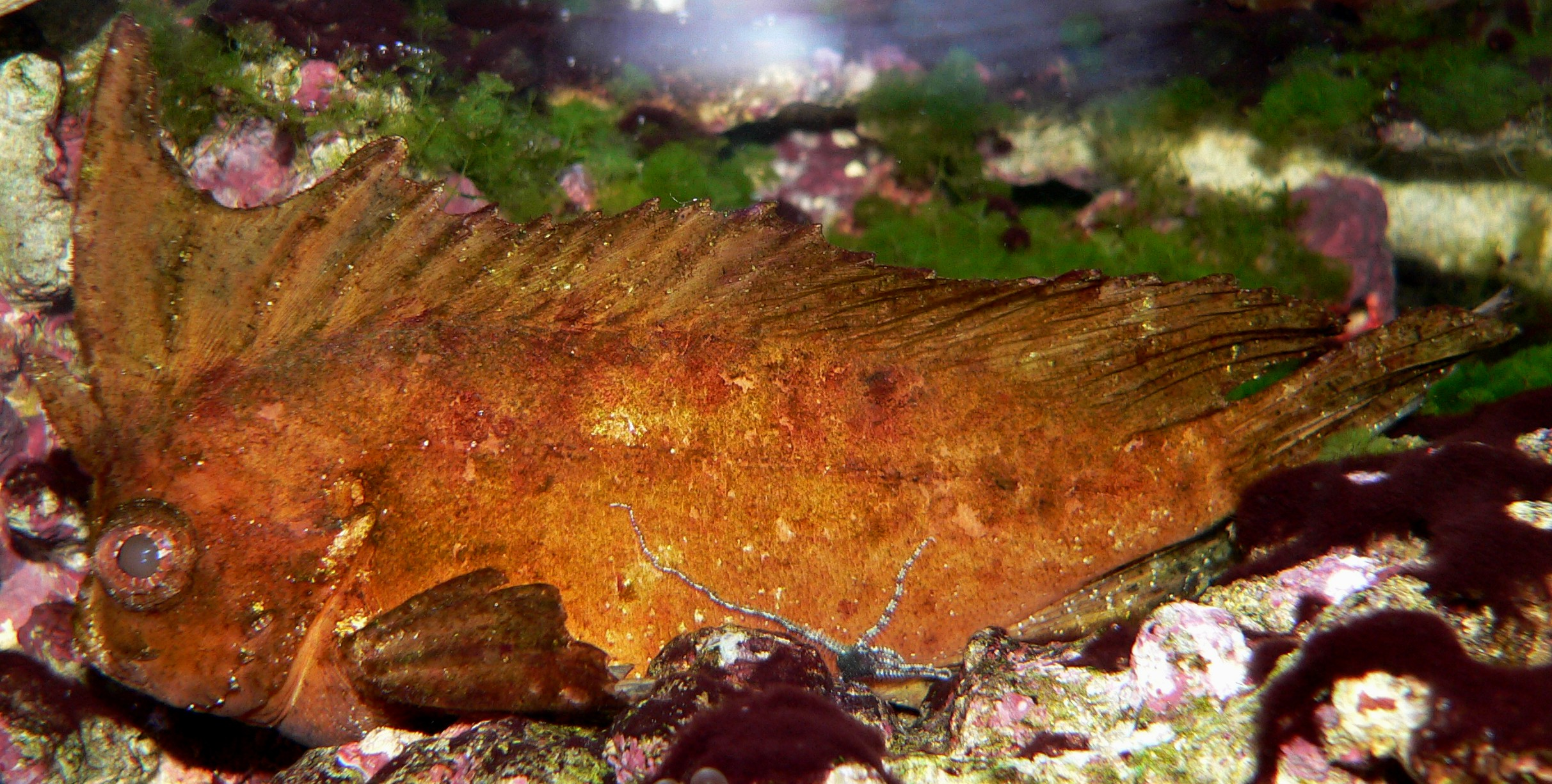
- Cockatoo waspfish (A. taenianotus)

Scientific classification
- Domain: Eukaryota
- Kingdom: Animalia
- Phylum: Chordata
- Class: Actinopterygii
- Order: Perciformes
- Family: Scorpaenidae
- Subfamily: Tetraroginae
- Genus: Ablabys; Kaup, 1873

Type species
- Apistus taenianotus Cuvier, 1829

Synonyms
- Amblyapistus Bleeker, 1876; Parocosia Whitley, 1958; Platypterus Swainson, 1839

= Ablabys =

Genus of fishes

Ablabys is a genus of marine ray-finned fishes, waspfishes belonging to the subfamily Tetraroginae, which is classified as part of the family Scorpaenidae, the scorpionfishes and their relatives. The fishes in this genus are found in the Indian Ocean and the western Pacific Ocean.

== Taxonomy ==
Ablabys was first formally described as a genus in 1873 by the German naturalist Johann Jakob Kaup. In 1966 the Australian ichthyologist Gilbert Percy Whitley designated Apistus taenianotus, which had been described by Georges Cuvier in 1829 from the Mascarene Islands, as the type species of the genus. The genus is included in the subfamily Tetraroginae within the Scorpaenidae in the 5th edition of Fishes of the World however other authorities place that subfamily within the stonefish family Synanceiidae, while other authorities classify this subfamily as a family in its own right. The genus name Ablabys derives from the Greek ablabes, which means "harmless", Kaup did not explain this but it may refer to "blunt armament of the head" as this genus has blunter head spines in comparison to related genera.

== Species ==
There are five recognized species are in this genus:

- Ablabys binotatus (W. K. H. Peters, 1855) (redskinfish)
- Ablabys gymnothorax Chungthanawong & Motomura, 2018 (scaleless spiny waspfish)
- Ablabys macracanthus (Bleeker, 1852) (spiny waspfish)
- Ablabys pauciporus Chungthanawong & Motomura, 2018 (lesser-scaled cockatoo waspfish)
- Ablabys taenianotus (G. Cuvier, 1829) (cockatoo waspfish)
