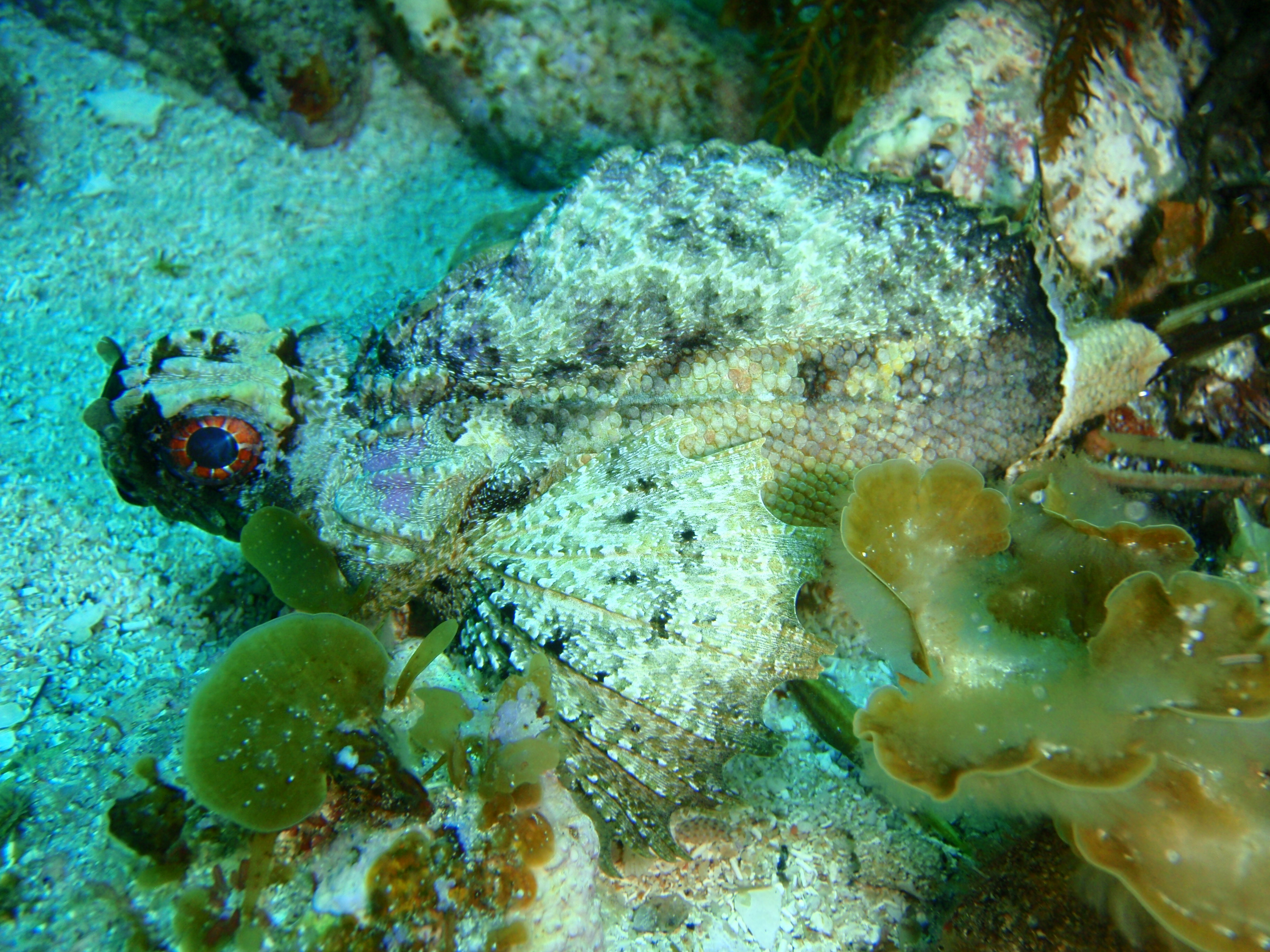

Scientific classification
- Kingdom: Animalia
- Phylum: Chordata
- Class: Actinopterygii
- Order: Perciformes
- Family: Synanceiidae
- Subfamily: Tetraroginae
- Genus: Glyptauchen; Günther, 1860
- Species: G. panduratus

Binomial name
- Glyptauchen panduratus (J. Richardson, 1850)

Synonyms
- Apistes panduratus Richardson, 1850; Glyptauchen insidiator Whitley, 1931

= Glyptauchen =

Species of waspfish endemic to the reefs off the southern coast of Australia

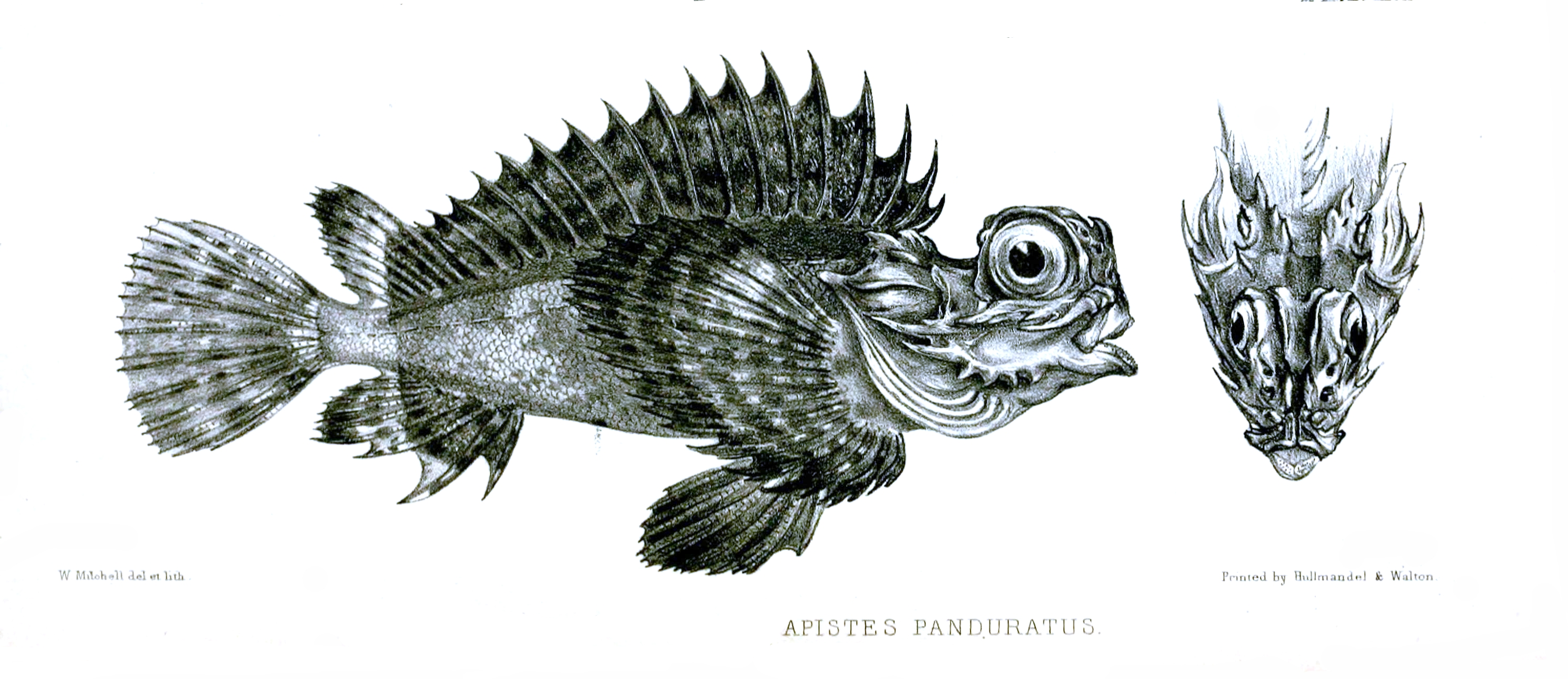
Goblinfish Glyptauchen panduratus (Richardson 1850), from lateral and head from dorsal

Glyptauchen is a monotypic genus of marine ray-finned fish belonging to the subfamily Tetraroginae, the waspfishes. The only species in the genus is the goblinfish (Glyptauchen panduratus), also known as the saddlehead or saddlehead goblinfish which is endemic to the southern coasts of Australia. The goblinfish has venomous spines in its fins.

== Taxonomy ==
Glyptauchen was first formally described as a genus in 1860 by the German-born British ichthyologist Albert Günther with Apistus panduratus as its type species by monotypy. Apistus panduratus was first formally described in 1850 by the Scottish naval surgeon, Arctic explorer and naturalist John Richardson with the type locality given as King George Sound in Western Australia. This taxon is included in the subfamily Tetraroginae within the Scorpaenidae in the 5th edition of Fishes of the World however other authorities place that subfamily within the stonefish family Synanceiidae, while other authorities classify this subfamily as a family in its own right. The genus name is a compound of glyptos, which means "engraved", and auchen, meaning nape, this is assumed to be an allusion to the deep saddle-like mark on the head. The specific name panduratus means "shaped like a fiddle", presumably a reference to the bulbous head.

== Description ==
The fish has an elongated, compressed body with a distinctive rounded to squarish head, with a 'neck', or notch, between the eyes and dorsal fin. A large erectile spine occurs on each side below the eyes which are ringed with red, and are the most visible part of the fish. The fins are well developed, the spinous part of dorsal fin is very long and fairly high, and the pectorals are long and wide and may be spread to the sides like fans. The colouration is cryptic, and is variable from white to grey, reddish-brown, and black. The fish can rapidly adjust its colouration to blend in with the environment. A dark band may be seen across the rear part of the body, with a caudal peduncle and posterior of dorsal and anal fins pale. Whitish patches and small black spots may be scattered on body and fins.

The goblinfish has venomous dorsal spines.

== Behaviour ==
The fish is a bottom dweller, generally nocturnal, and does not move around much during the day, so it is not seen very often by divers.

== Habitat and distribution ==
It is found in sheltered and moderately exposed coastal reef and rocky areas in estuaries between 3 and 60 m deep near Rottnest Island, Western Australia, to Sydney, New South Wales, and around Tasmania.

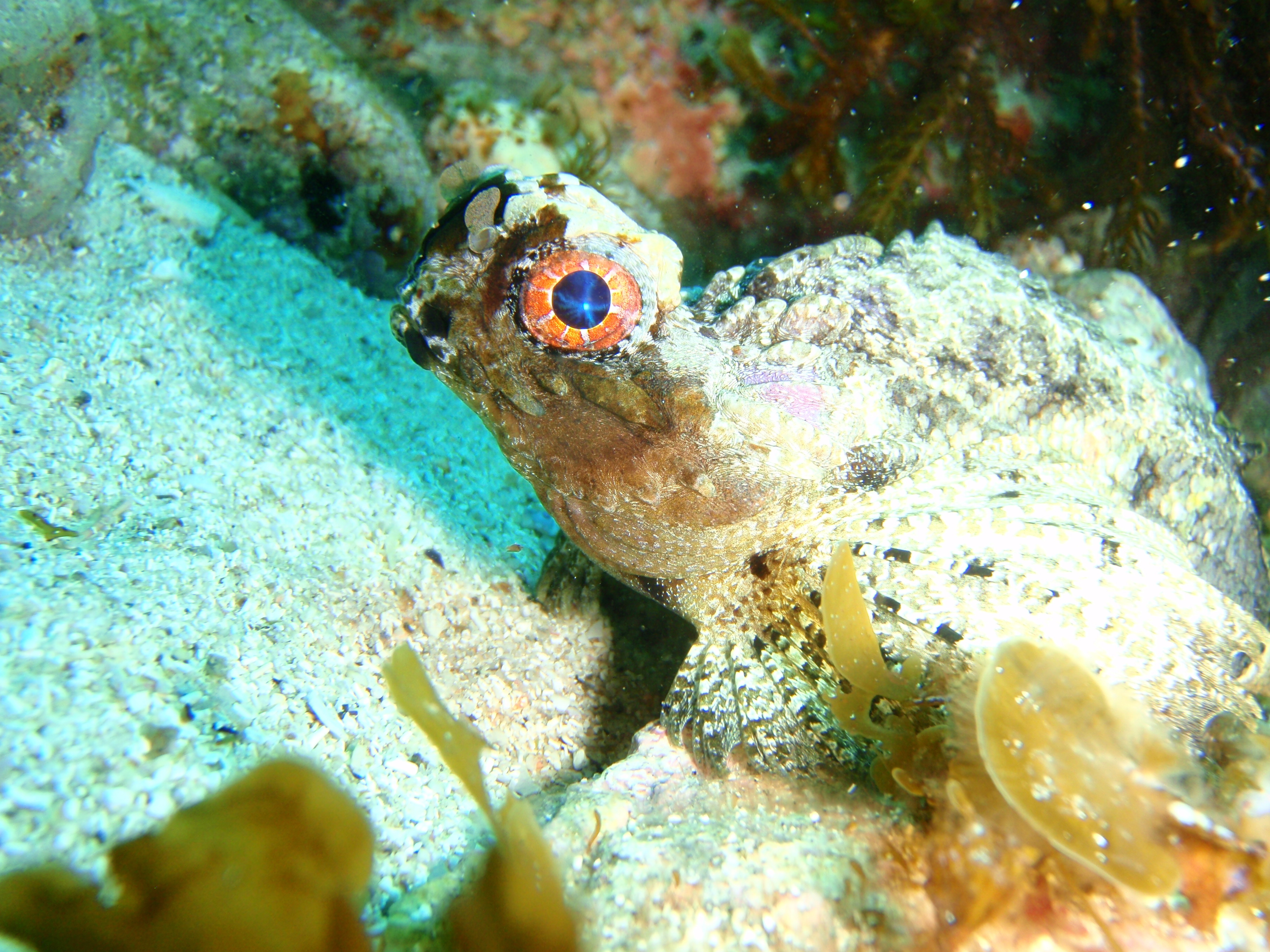

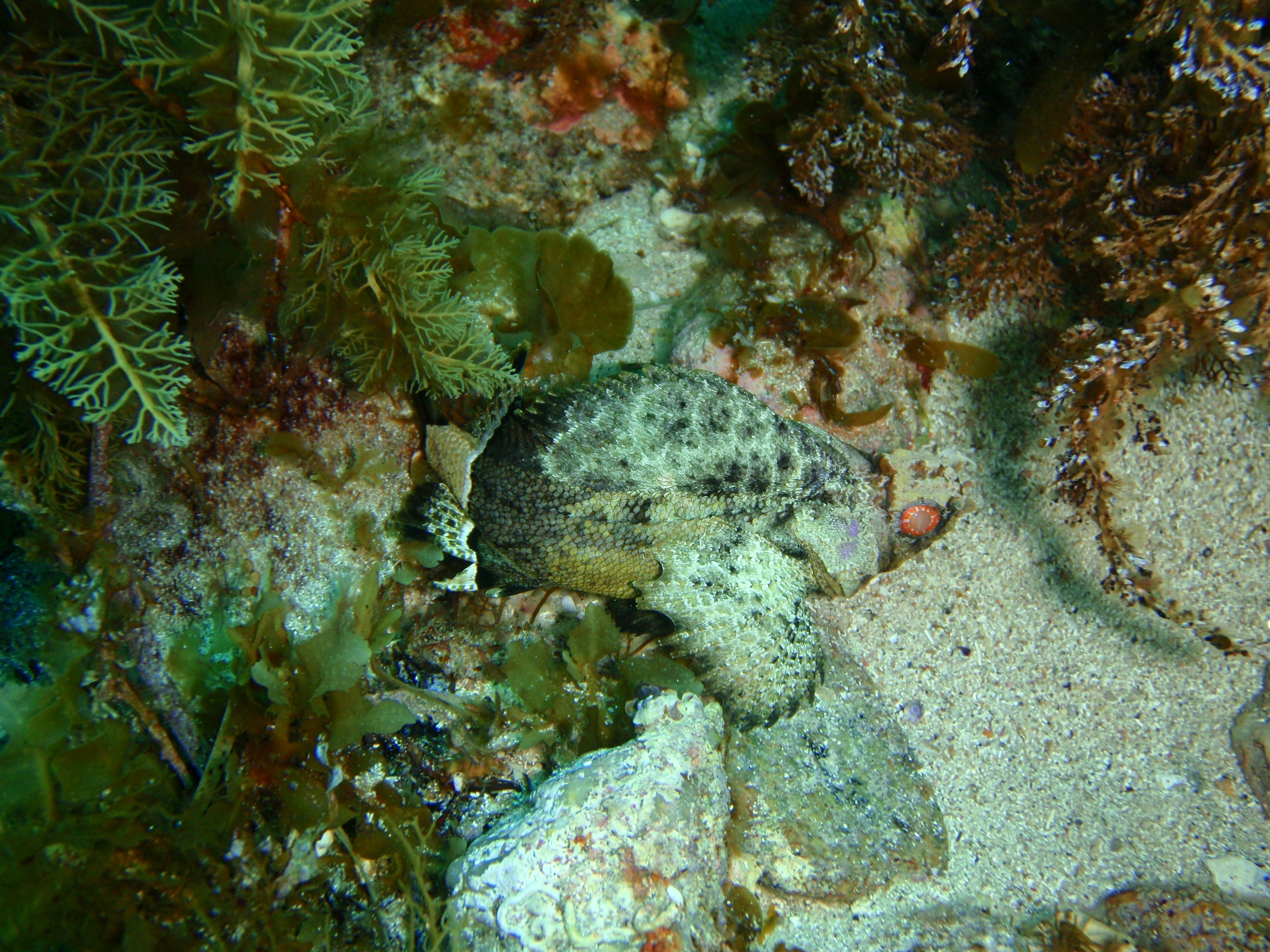

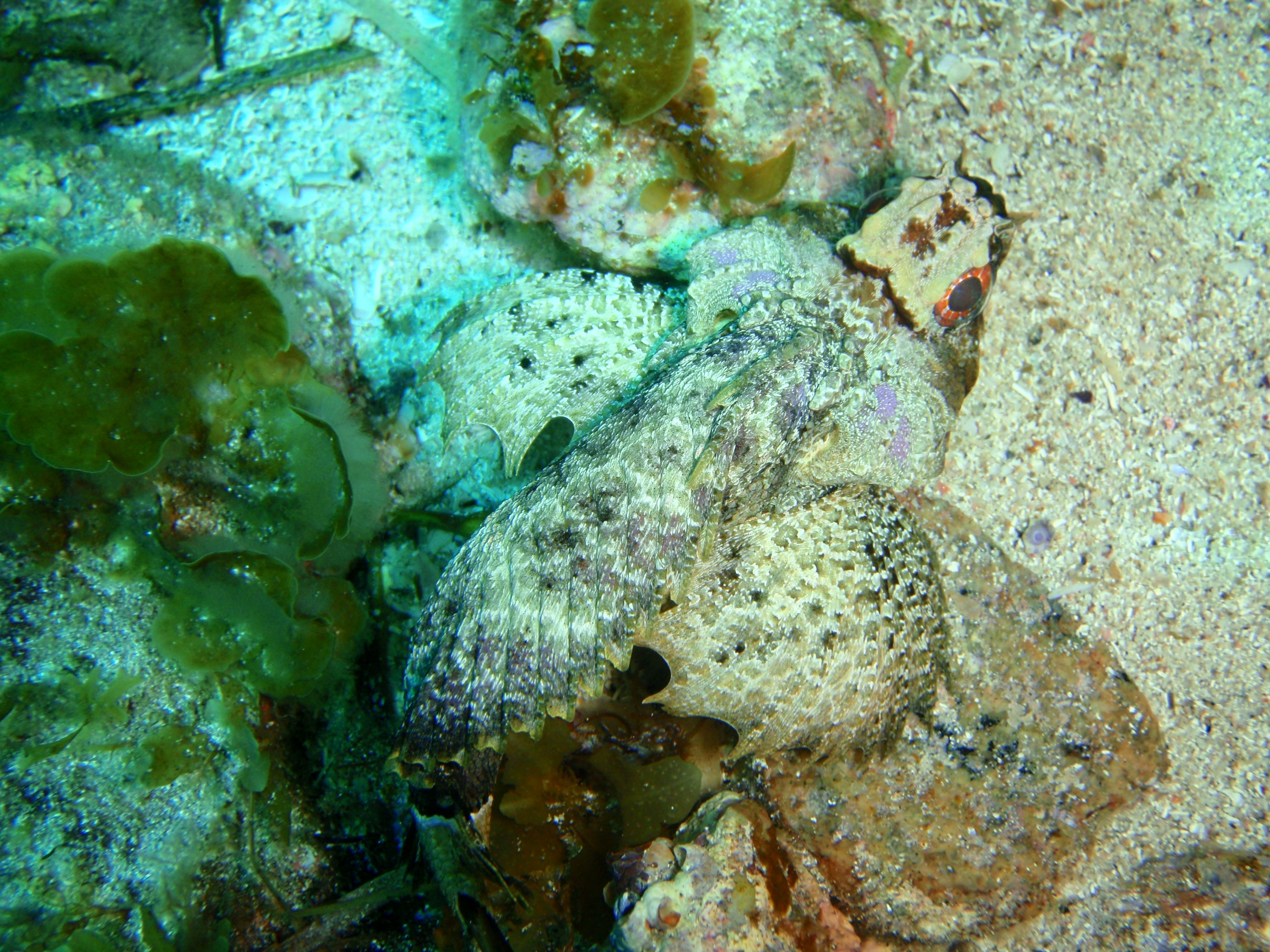

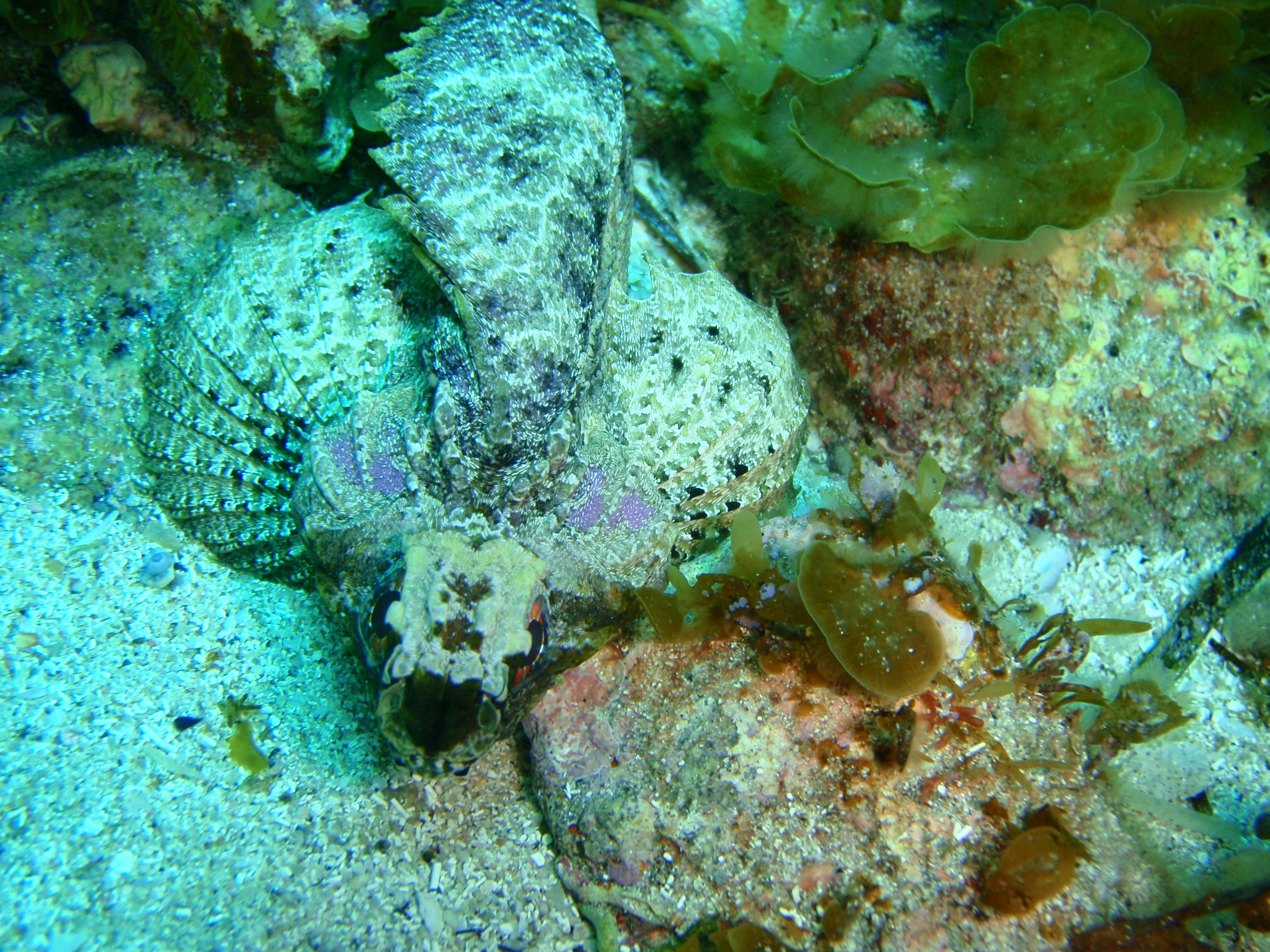

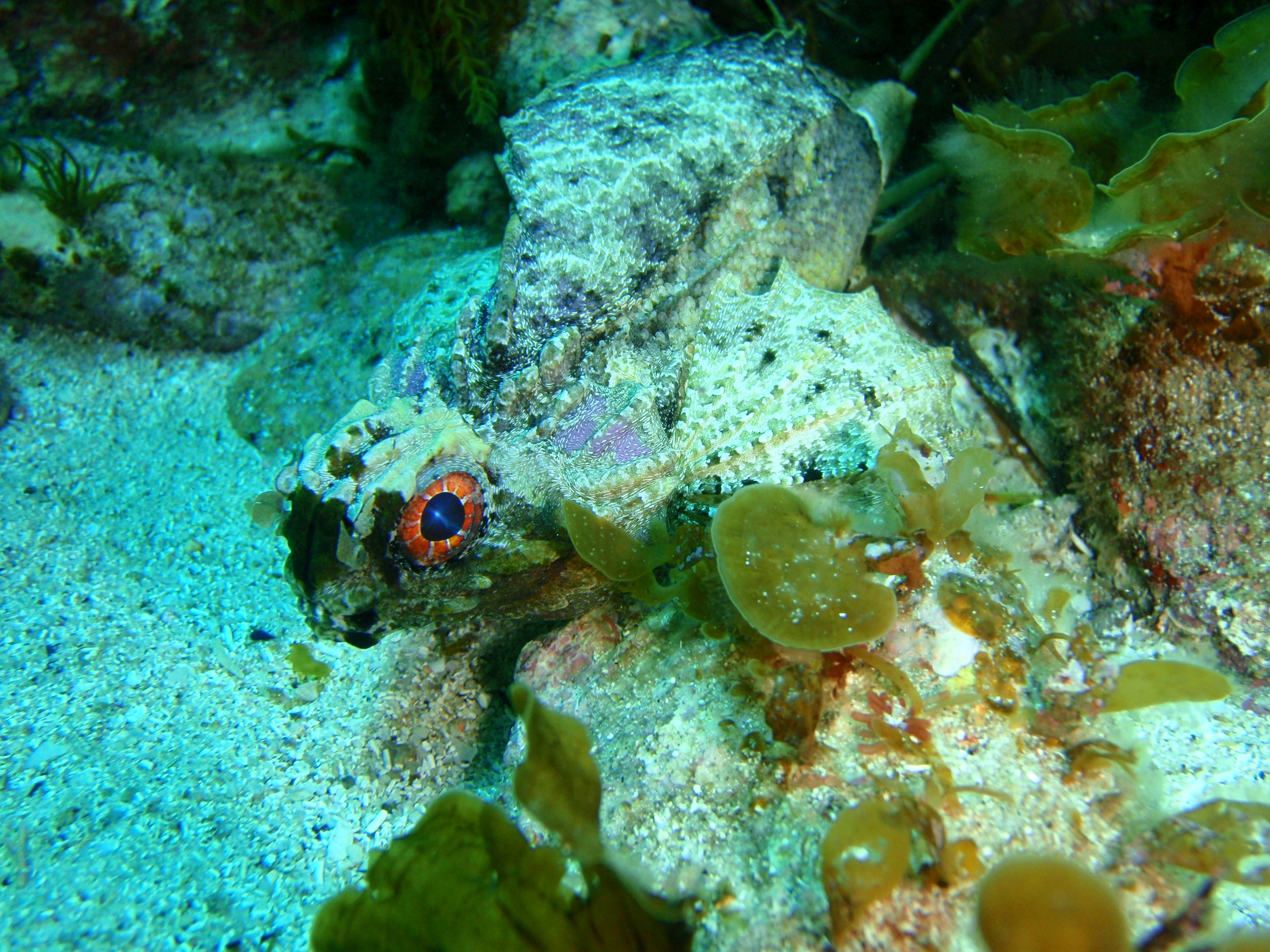

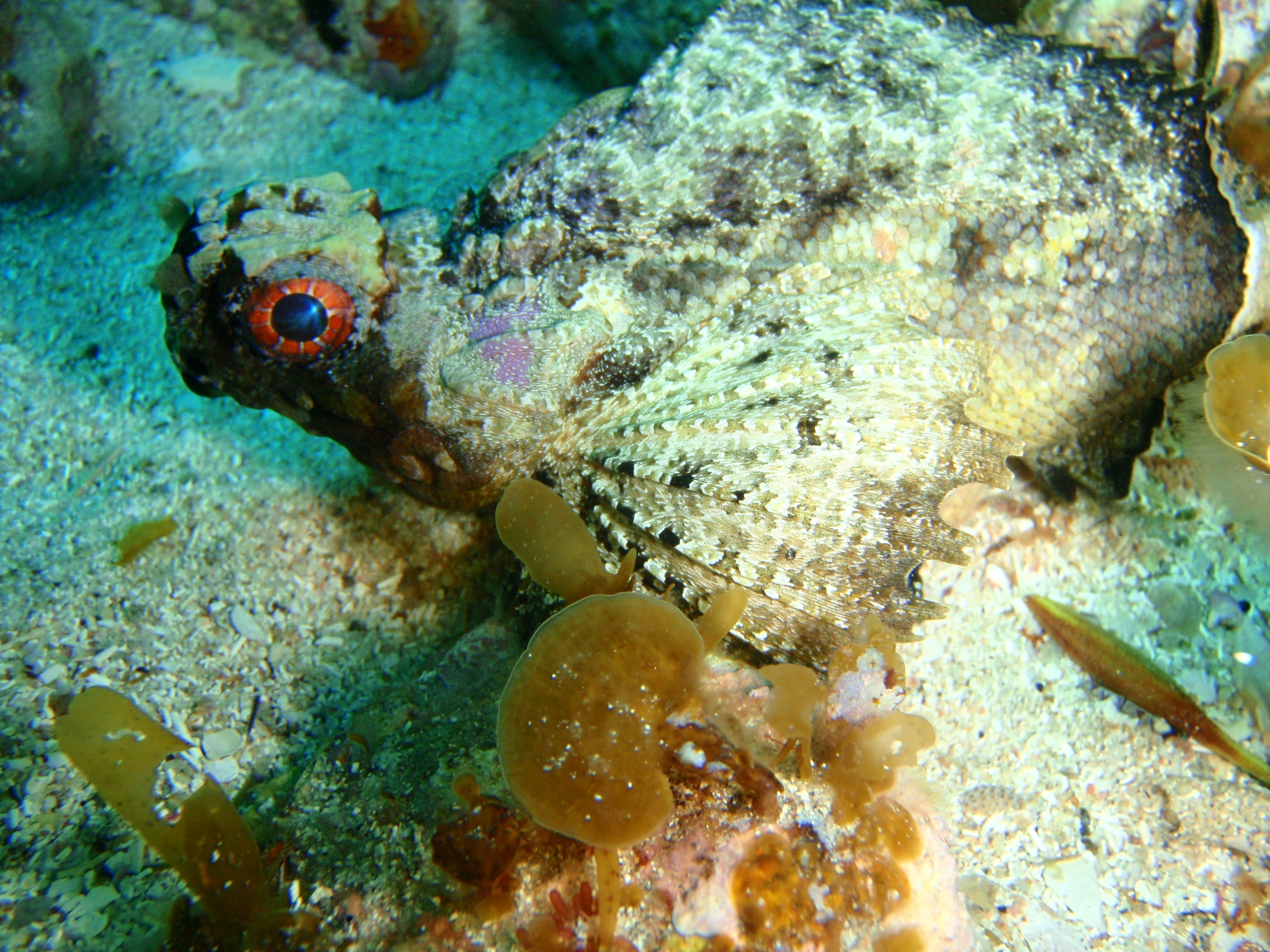
