= Kulbicki's triplefin =

Conservation status
- Least Concern (IUCN 3.1)

Scientific classification
- Kingdom: Animalia
- Phylum: Chordata
- Class: Actinopterygii
- Order: Blenniiformes
- Family: Tripterygiidae
- Genus: Springerichthys
- Species: S. kulbickii

Binomial name
- Springerichthys kulbickii (Fricke & Randall, 1994)

Synonyms
- Gracilopterygion kulbickii Fricke & Randall, 1994

Species of fish

The Kulbicki's triplefin (Springerichthys kulbickii) is a species of triplefin blenny in the genus Springerichthys. It was described by Ronald Fricke and John E. Randall in 1994, honouring the fish ecologist reef-fish ecologist Michel L. Kulbicki of L'Office de la Recherche Scientifique et Technique d'Outre-Mer in Nouméa, who collected type in New Caledonia, in its specific name. Kulbicki's triplefin is found in the southwestern Pacific Ocean from Queensland, Australia across the central Pacific to the Samoa, where it is found on rocky and coral reefs down to 15 metres (49 ft) in depth.
