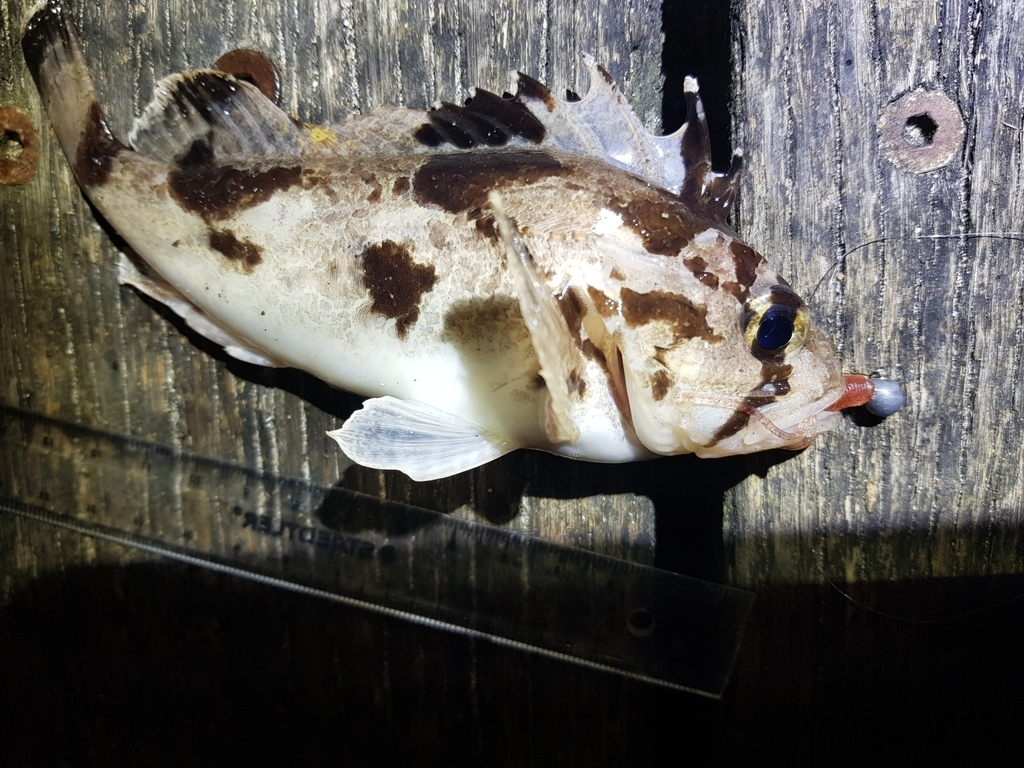

Scientific classification
- Kingdom: Animalia
- Phylum: Chordata
- Class: Actinopterygii
- Order: Perciformes
- Family: Synanceiidae
- Subfamily: Tetraroginae
- Genus: Gymnapistes; Swainson, 1839
- Species: G. marmoratus

Binomial name
- Gymnapistes marmoratus (G. Cuvier, 1829)

Synonyms
- Apistus marmoratus Cuvier, 1829; Pentaroge marmorata (Cuvier, 1829)

= South Australian cobbler =

Species of fish

The South Australian cobbler (Gymnapistes marmoratus), better known as the soldier but also known as the cobbler, devilfish or soldierfish, is a species of marine ray-finned fish, a waspfish, belonging to the subfamily Tetraroginae which is classified within the family Scorpaenidae, the scorpionfishes and their relatives. It is endemic to southern Australia. It is the only species in the monotypic genus Gymnapistes.

== Taxonomy ==
The South Australian cobbler was first formally described in 1829 as Apistus marmoratus by the French zoologist Georges Cuvier with the type locality given as "Timor Island, southern Malay Archipelago", although this is likely to be an error and the actual locality is in Western Australia. In 1839 the English zoologist William Swainson placed it in the new genus Gymnapistes, as its only species. This taxon is included in the subfamily Tetraroginae within the Scorpaenidae in the 5th edition of Fishes of the World however other authorities place that subfamily within the stonefish family Synanceiidae, while other authorities classify this subfamily as a family in its own right. The genus name is a compound of gymnos which means "bare" or "naked" with Apistes, this was originally proposed as a subgenus of Apistus and the first part alludes to the mostly scaleless body of this taxon. The specific name marmoratus means "marbled" as in alcohol this fish has a marbled appearance.

== Description ==
The South Australian cobbler has a long based dorsal fin which has 12 or 13 spines, each separated by an incision in the membrane between them, and between 7 and 10 soft rays, the spiny and soft-rayed parts are separated by an incision, with 3 spines and 4 to 6 soft rays in its anal fin. It eye does not bulge above the dorsal profile of the head, the intraorbital space is slightly concave and there are several obvious spines on the head. The lacrimal bone is mobile and has a sizeable, curved, erectile spine to its posterior and a smaller anterior spine. The only scales are on the lateral line. This fish has a mottled pattern made up of brown to dark brown blotches on the upper body fading to pale ventrally. These blotches are less obvious in the larger fish. There is an obvious dark blotch on the dorsal fin between the 4th and 7th spines. There is a dark, oblong spot near the base on the pectoral fin while the other fins often have vermiculations or vague spotting. This species attains a maximum total length of 22.5 cm (8.9 in).

== Distribution and habitat ==
The South Australian cobbler is endemic to the temperate southern coasts of Australia. Its distribution extends from the central coast of New South Wales to Perth, Western Australia. It is found in shallow inshore waters, tidal pools and estuaries at depths between 0.25 and 35 m (9.8 in and 114 ft 10.0 in) in beds of seagrass.

== Biology ==
The South Australian cobbler is a nocturnal ambush predator, with the smaller fish feeding mainly on shrimp and small crabs and the larger fish being more piscivorous. It stays motionless during the day. These fishes attain sexual maturity at 2 to 4 years old. The adults leave the seagrass beds in the late winter and early spring, congregating in deeper water in very large aggregations, thought to be spawning aggregations. It is a slow-growing species and large individuals are much older in comparison to other species at the same size. They can live for more than 14 years. The adults have venom-bearing spines on the infraorbital bone, preopercular bone and in the dorsal, anal and pectoral fins.

== Utilisation ==
The South Australian cobbler is taken as bycatch in both commercial and recreational fisheries.

== Venom ==
The South Australian cobbler is well defended with venomous spines on the head and in the fins. People who have been envenomated by this fish rarely die, symptoms of envenomation include severe pain around the envenomated area of the body, swelling, nausea, perspiration, paralysis of the limbs and fainting. In worst cases the venom may interfere with the functioning of cardiovascular system.
