= Humpback waspfish =

Scientific classification
- Kingdom: Animalia
- Phylum: Chordata
- Class: Actinopterygii
- Order: Perciformes
- Family: Synanceiidae
- Subfamily: Apistinae
- Genus: Cheroscorpaena; Mees, 1964
- Species: C. tridactyla

Binomial name
- Cheroscorpaena tridactyla Mees, 1964

Species of fish

The humpback waspfish, (Cheroscorpaena tridactyla), is a species of wasp scorpionfish found only in the Gulf of Papua where it is an inhabitant of coral reefs. This species grows to a length of 15 centimetres (5.9 in) TL. This species is the only known member of its genus.
