= Liocranium =

Scientific classification
- Kingdom: Animalia
- Phylum: Chordata
- Class: Actinopterygii
- Order: Perciformes
- Family: Synanceiidae
- Subfamily: Tetraroginae
- Genus: Liocranium; Ogilby, 1903

Type species
- Liocranium praepositum Ogilby, 1903

Synonyms
- Abcichthys Whitley, 1927

Genus of fishes

Liocranium is a small genus of marine ray-finned fishes, waspfishes belonging to the subfamily Tetraroginae, which is classified as part of the family Scorpaenidae, the scorpionfishes and their relatives. The fishes in this genus are found in the eastern Indian Ocean and the western Pacific Ocean.

== Taxonomy ==
Liocranium was first described as a genus in 1903 by the Australian ichthyologist James Douglas Ogilby when he described a new species of waspfish from Queensland he called Liocranium praepositum and placed in a new monotypic genus. In 1927 Gilbert Percy Whitley proposed the name Abcichthys for this genus as he considered that Liocranium was preoccupied by the spider genus Liocranum, however, there is enough difference between these two names to regard Liocranium as valid and Whitley's name is treated as a synonym. In 1964 Mees classified Paracentropogon pleurostigma, which had been described by Weber from New Guinea, as a subspecies of L. praepositum, L.p. pleurostigma. It has subsequently been recognised as the second species in the genus Liocranium. This taxon is included in the subfamily Tetraroginae within the Scorpaenidae in the 5th edition of Fishes of the World however other authorities place that subfamily within the stonefish family Synanceiidae, while other authorities classify this subfamily as a family in its own right. The genus name liocranium is a compound of leios, meaning "smooth", and cranium, which means "skull", presumed to refer to the head of L. praepositum which has no skin flaps or tentacles.

== Species ==
Liocranium has the following 2 species classified within it:

- Liocranium pleurostigma (Weber, 1913) (western blackspot waspfish)
- Liocranium praepositum Ogilby, 1903 (blackspot waspfish)

== Characteristics ==
Liocranium waspfishes are characterised by having the origin of the dorsal fin being clearly in front of a vertical line running from the rear of the orbit. The dorsal fin is continuous with the front 3 spines not being nearly separate from the other 10. The dorsal fin contains 13 spines and 8, unfrequently 7 or 9, soft rays. There are 14, sometimes 13 or 15, fin rays in the pectoral fins, 4 in the pelvic fins and 5 or 6 in the anal fin. There are no teeth on the palatine bone, There are many, small cycloid scales covering the flanks. The body has a depth which is 39–46% of its standard length. These fishes attain a maximum total length of 13 to 14 cm (5.1 to 5.5 in).
