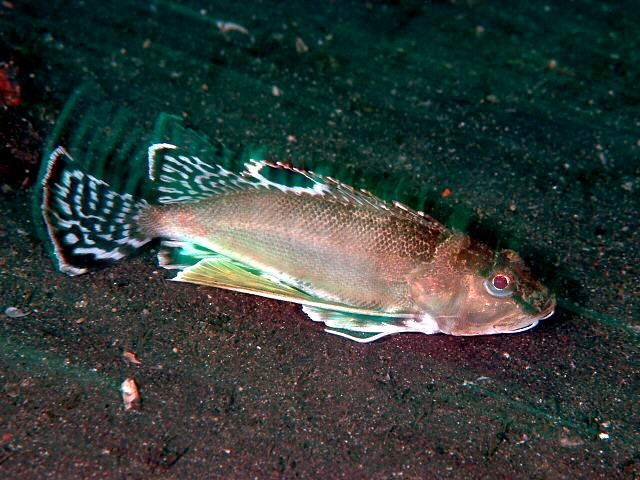
- Ocellated waspfish (Apistus carinatus)

Scientific classification
- Kingdom: Animalia
- Phylum: Chordata
- Class: Actinopterygii
- Order: Perciformes
- Family: Synanceiidae
- Subfamily: Apistinae; T. N. Gill, 1859

Genera
- see text

= Apistinae =

Subfamily of ray-finned fishes

Apistinae, the wasp scorpionfishes, is a subfamily of venomous, marine ray-finned fishes belonging to the family Scorpaenidae, the scorpionfishes and related species. These fishes are native to the Indian Ocean and the western Pacific Ocean.

== Taxonomy ==
Apistinae, or Apsitidae, was first formally recognised as a taxonomic grouping in 1859 by the American ichthyologist Theodore Gill. The 5th edition of Fishes of the World treats this as a subfamily of the scorpionfish family Scorpaenidae, although other authorities treat it as a valid family, the Apistidae. The name of the subfamily is based on the genus name Apistus, which means "untrustworthy" or "perfidious", a name Cuvier explained as being due to the long and mobile spines around the eyes, which he described as "very offensive weapons that these fish use when you least expect it".

A recent study placed the wasp scorpionfishes into an expanded stonefish clade (Synanceiidae) because all of these fish have a lachrymal saber that can project a switch-blade-like mechanism out from underneath their eye.

== Genera ==
Apistinae contains the following 3 monotypic genera:

- Apistops Ogilby, 1911
- Apistus Cuvier, 1829
- Cheroscorpaena Mees, 1964

== Characteristics ==
Apistinae species have either 1 or 3 lower pectoral fin rays which are free of the fin membrane and a swimbladder with 2 lobes. They are fairly small fishes reaching lengths of 15 centimetres (5.9 in) TL in the humpback waspfish to 20 centimetres (7.9 in) TL in the ocellated waspfish.

== Distribution and habitat ==
Apistinae species are found in the Indian and Pacific Oceans from the Red Sea and the eastern coast of Africa east in to the western Pacific Ocean, north to Japan and south to Australia. They are demersal species of the continental shelf and may be found over soft substrates or on reefs.
