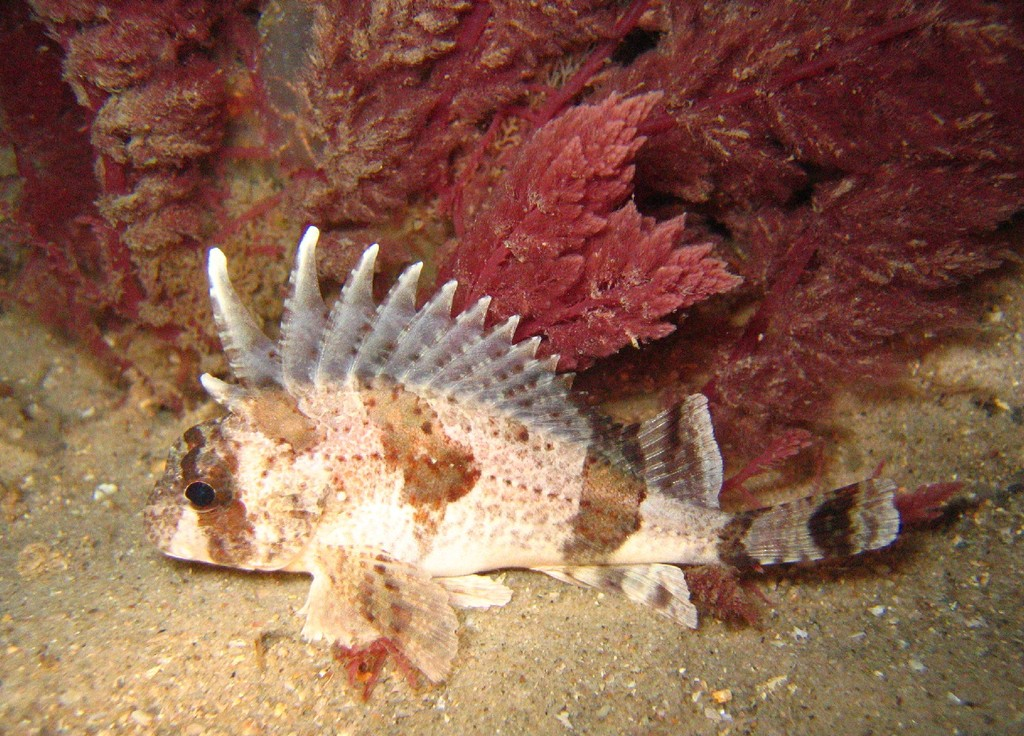
- Fortescue (C. australis)

Scientific classification
- Kingdom: Animalia
- Phylum: Chordata
- Class: Actinopterygii
- Order: Perciformes
- Family: Synanceiidae
- Subfamily: Tetraroginae
- Genus: Centropogon; Günther, 1860

Type species
- Cottus australis Shaw, 1790

= Centropogon (fish) =

Genus of fishes

Centropogon is a genus of ray-finned fishes, waspfishes belonging to the subfamily Tetraroginae, which is classified as part of the family Scorpaenidae, the scorpionfishes and their relatives. These fishes are endemic to the brackish and marine waters around Australia.

== Taxonomy ==
Centropogon was first described as a genus of fishes in 1860 by the German-born British ichthyologist Albert Günther. The genus was created for Apistus australis, which had originally been described as Cottus australis in 1790 by George Shaw in John White's Journal of a voyage to New South Wales. The genus is included in the subfamily Tetraroginae within the Scorpaenidae in the 5th edition of Fishes of the World however other authorities place that subfamily within the stonefish family Synanceiidae, while other authorities classify this subfamily as a family in its own right. The genus name is a compound of kentron, meaning a "thorn" or "spine", and "pogon", which means "beard". This name was not explained by Günther but is thought to allude to the many spines on the preorbital and preoperculum, having some similarity to a spiny "beard".

== Species ==
Three recognized species are in this genus:

- Centropogon australis (Shaw, 1790) (fortescue or eastern fortescue)
- Centropogon latifrons Mees, 1962 (pale fortescue)
- Centropogon marmoratus Günther, 1862 (marbled fortescue)
