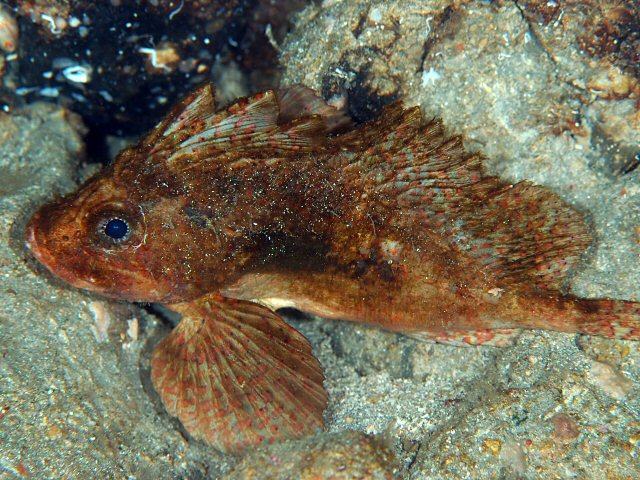
- S. yamanokami

Scientific classification
- Domain: Eukaryota
- Kingdom: Animalia
- Phylum: Chordata
- Class: Actinopterygii
- Order: Perciformes
- Family: Scorpaenidae
- Subfamily: Tetraroginae
- Genus: Snyderina; D. S. Jordan & Starks, 1901

Type species
- Snyderina yamanokami D.S. Jordan & Starks, 1901

= Snyderina =

Genus of fishes

Snyderina is a genus of ray-finned fishes, waspfishes belonging to the subfamily Tetraroginae, which is classified as part of the family Scorpaenidae, the scorpionfishes and their relatives. These fishes are found in the western Indian Ocean and the western Pacific Ocean.

== Taxonomy ==
Snyderina was first described as a genus in 1901 by the American ichthyologists David Starr Jordan and Edwin Chapin Starks, Jordan and Starks described it as a monotypic genus for their newly described Snyderina yamanokami from Kagoshima on Kyushu in Japan. Later the western Indian Ocean species, Tetraroge guentheri, which had been described in 1889 by the Belgian born British ichthyologist George Albert Boulenger, was also classified within Snyderina. This genus is included in the subfamily Tetraroginae within the Scorpaenidae in the 5th edition of Fishes of the World however other authorities place that subfamily within the stonefish family Synanceiidae, while other authorities classify this subfamily as a family in its own right. The genus name Snyderina honours Jordan and Starks' fellow American ichthyologist John Otterbein Snyder for his studies nof Japanese fishes.

== Species ==
There are currently two recognized species in this genus:

- Snyderina guentheri (Boulenger, 1889) (Günther's waspfish)
- Snyderina yamanokami D. S. Jordan & Starks, 1901

== Characteristics ==
Snyderichthys waspfishes are characterised by having the body covered in small scales, a single spine and 5 rays in the pelvic fin. The dorsal fin has its origin in front of the rear margin of the orbit and contains between 12 and 16 spines with the final soft ray being connected to the caudal peduncle but not to the caudal fin. The head has an oblique dorsal profile and there are no teeth on the palatine. There are no detached fin rays in the pectoral fin. These fishes have maximum published total lengths of 21.5 cm (8.5 in) for S. guentheri and 25 cm (9.8 in) for S. yamanokami.

== Distribution and habitat ==
Snyderichthys waspfishes are found in the Indo-Pacific with S. guentheri being found in the northern western Indian Ocean in the Arabian Sea and off the east coast of India while S. yamanokami is found in the western Pacific from Japan south to Australia. They are found in shallow water as deep as c.90 m (300 ft), although it is found in greater depths off Australia.
