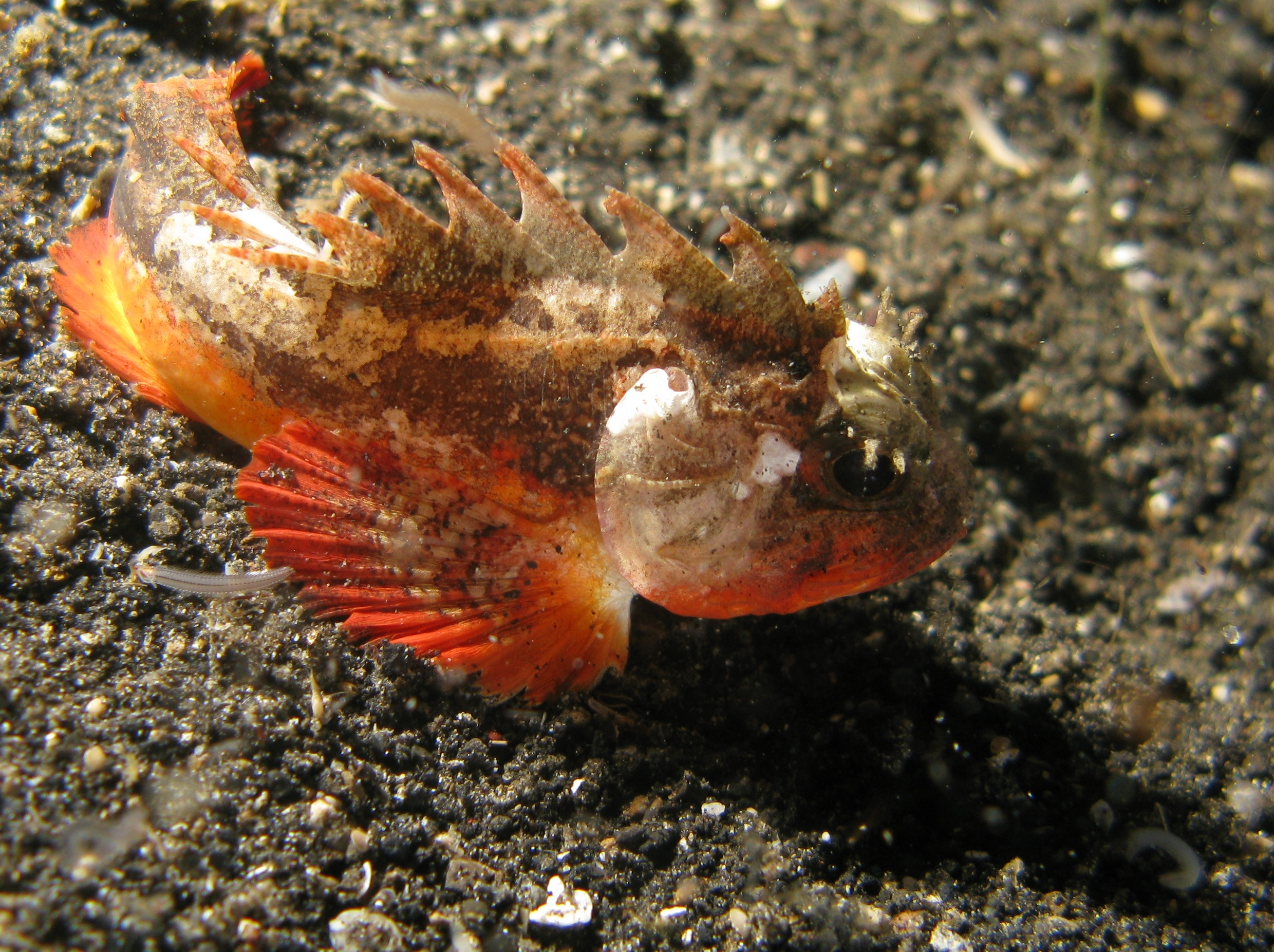

Conservation status
- Least Concern (IUCN 3.1)

Scientific classification
- Kingdom: Animalia
- Phylum: Chordata
- Class: Actinopterygii
- Order: Perciformes
- Family: Synanceiidae
- Subfamily: Tetraroginae
- Genus: Richardsonichthys; J. L. B. Smith, 1958
- Species: R. leucogaster

Binomial name
- Richardsonichthys leucogaster (Richardson, 1848)

Synonyms
- Apistes leucogaster Richardson, 1848; Tetraroge leucogaster (Richardson, 1848); Tetraroge darnleyensis Alleyne & Macleay, 1877

= Richardsonichthys =

Species of fish

Richardsonichthys, is a monotypic genus of marine ray-finned fish belonging to the subfamily Tetraroginae, the waspfishes, which is classified as part of the family Scorpaenidae, the scorpionfishes and their relatives. The only species in the genus is the whiteface waspfish (Richardsonichthys leucogaster), also known as the whitebelly roguefish, rouge fish, Torres Strait soldier fish or Richardson's waspfish. This species is native to reefs of the Indian Ocean and the western Pacific Ocean.

== Taxonomy ==
Richardsonichthys was first described as a genus in 1958 by the South African ichthyologist J. L. B. Smith as a monotypic genus, the only species being Apistes leucogaster. A. leucogaster had been described in 1848 by the Scottish naval surgeon, Arctic explorer and naturalist John Richardson with its type locality given as the "Sea of China". This taxon is included in the subfamily Tetraroginae within the Scorpaenidae in the 5th edition of Fishes of the World however other authorities place that subfamily within the stonefish family Synanceiidae, while other authorities classify this subfamily as a family in its own right. Smith named the new genus, Richardsonichthys, in honour of Richardson and appended his name with ichthys, which is Greek for "fish". The specific name, leucogaster, means "white-bellied", an allusion to the white ventral surface of this species.

== Description ==
Richardsonichthys leucogaster has an oblong body, which does not show strong lateral compression, with a rounded dorsal profile of the head. The body has almost no scales except for those making up the lateral line. The lachrymal bone has 2 spines and the uppermost spine obn the preoperculum is highly developed. The dorsal fin has its origin in front of the rear of the orbit. The dorsal fin contains 13 spines, separated by deeply incised membranes, and 8 soft rays. The first dorsal fin spine is over half the length of second spine. The anal fin has 3 spines and 6 soft rays. The caudal fin is rounded, lacking elongated outer rays. The colour is very variable but lower body, the pectoral, pelvic, anal and caudal fins are typically reddish. This species reaches a maximum total length of 10 cm (3.9 in).

== Distribution and habitat ==
Richardsonichthys leucogaster has an Indo-Pacific distribution. It is found off Tanzania and Mozambique in eastern Africa and Madagascar, the Seychelles, the east coast of India and from the eastern Andaman Sea east into the Western Pacific to New Caledonia, south to Australia and north to southern China. It occurs at depths between 8 and 90 m (26 and 295 ft) on sandy substrates or associated with corals. It may be associated with seagrass beds in some areas.

== Biology ==
Richardsonichthys leucogaster is nocturnal, burying itself into the sand in the daytime and emerging at night to hunt.
