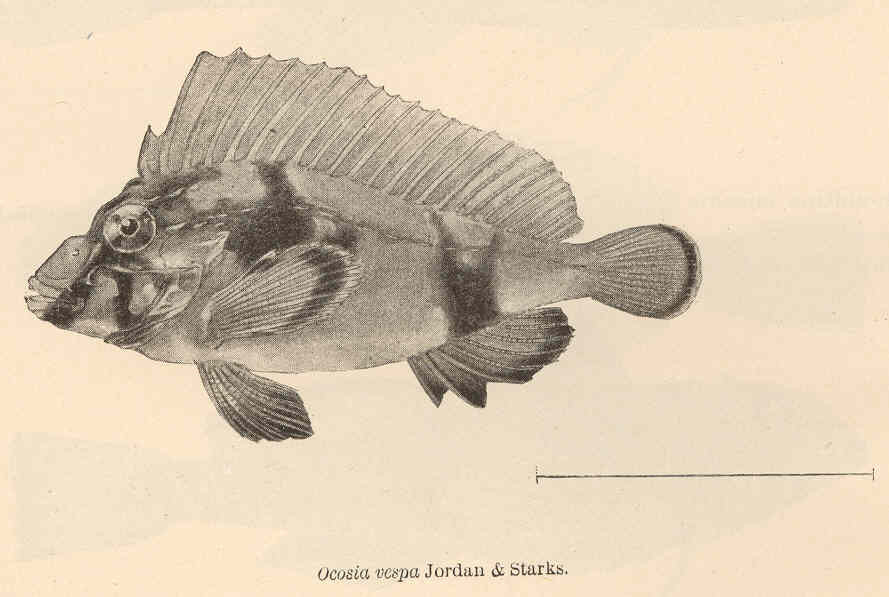
- Ocosia vespa

Scientific classification
- Domain: Eukaryota
- Kingdom: Animalia
- Phylum: Chordata
- Class: Actinopterygii
- Order: Perciformes
- Family: Scorpaenidae
- Subfamily: Tetraroginae
- Genus: Ocosia; D. S. Jordan & Starks, 1904

Type species
- Ocosia vespa Jordan & Starks, 1904

= Ocosia =

Genus of fishes

Ocosia is a genus of ray-finned fishes, waspfishes belonging to the subfamily Tetraroginae, which is classified as part of the family Scorpaenidae, the scorpionfishes and their relatives. These fish are found in the Indian Ocean and western Pacific Ocean.

== Taxonomy ==
Ocosia was originally described as a monotypic genus in 1904 by the American ichthyologists David Starr Jordan and Edwin Chapin Starks when they were describing Ocosia vespa as a new species with its type locality given as Sagami Bay in Japan. This taxon is included in the subfamily Tetraroginae within the Scorpaenidae in the 5th edition of Fishes of the World however other authorities place that subfamily within the stonefish family Synanceiidae, while other authorities classify this subfamily as a family in its own right. The genus name Ocosia is a latinisation of the Japanese word for venomous fishes in the Scorpaeniformes, okoze.

== Species ==
There are currently 9 recognized species in this genus:

- Ocosia apia Poss & Eschmeyer, 1975 (stoutspine waspfish)
- Ocosia dorsomaculata Chungthanawong & Motomura, 2022
- Ocosia fasciata Matsubara, 1943
- Ocosia possi Mandritsa & S. I. Usachev, 1990
- Ocosia ramaraoi Poss & Eschmeyer, 1975
- Ocosia sphex Fricke, 2017 (Bismarck waspfish)
- Ocosia spinosa L. C. Chen, 1981
- Ocosia vespa D. S. Jordan & Starks, 1904
- Ocosia zaspilota Poss & Eschmeyer, 1975 (polka dot waspfish)

== Characteristics ==
Ocosia waspfishes are characterised by having naked bodies with scales being largely absent. They have a single spine and 5 soft rays in the pelvic fin. There are teeth on the palatine. The origin of the dorsal fin is in front of the rear of the orbit and there are between 14 and 17 spines in that fin. They have a straight, oblique dorsal profile of the head with no tentacles. The lateral line is clearly separated from the base of the dorsal fin and the uppermost part of the operculum does not extend as far as the base of the dorsal fin. They do not have papillae on the head and body. These are small fishes and the largest species, O. ramaraoi reaches a maximum standard length of 8.2 cm (3.2 in).
