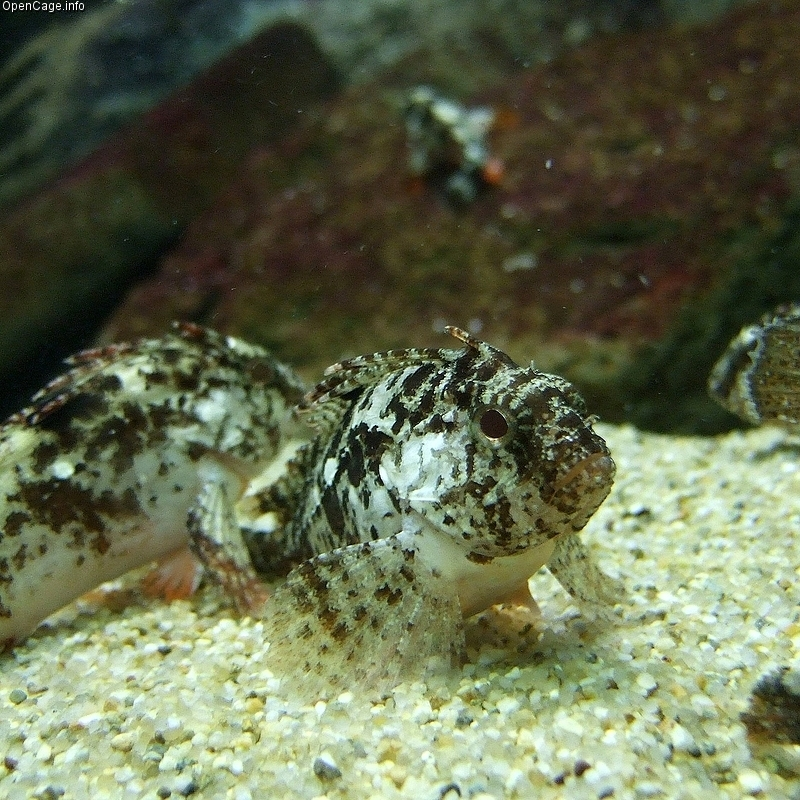
- P. rubripinnis

Scientific classification
- Domain: Eukaryota
- Kingdom: Animalia
- Phylum: Chordata
- Class: Actinopterygii
- Order: Perciformes
- Family: Scorpaenidae
- Subfamily: Tetraroginae
- Genus: Paracentropogon; Bleeker, 1876

Type species
- Apistus longispinis Cuvier, 1829

Synonyms
- Daia Ogilby, 1903

= Paracentropogon =

Genus of fishes

Paracentropogon is a genus of ray-finned fishes, waspfishes belonging to the subfamily Tetraroginae, which is classified as part of the family Scorpaenidae, the scorpionfishes and their relatives, These fish are found in the Indian Ocean and western Pacific Ocean.

== Taxonomy ==
Paracentropogon was originally described as a genus in 1876 by the Dutch herpetologist and ichthyologist Pieter Bleeker with Apistus longispinis designated as its type species. Apistus longispinis was described by Georges Cuvier in 1829 from Ambon Island. This genus is included in the subfamily Tetraroginae within the Scorpaenidae in the 5th edition of Fishes of the World however other authorities place that subfamily within the stonefish family Synanceiidae, while other authorities classify this subfamily as a family in its own right. The genus name Paracentropogon refers to this genus's close relationship to Centropogon.

== Species ==
There are currently four recognized species in this genus:

- Paracentropogon longispinis (G. Cuvier, 1829) (wispy waspfish)
- Paracentropogon rubripinnis (Temminck & Schlegel, 1843)
- Paracentropogon vespa J. D. Ogilby, 1910 (wasp roguefish)
- Paracentropogon zonatus (M. C. W. Weber, 1913) (bandtail waspfish)

Some authorities consider it likely that P. vespa is a junior synonym of P. longispinis.

== Characteristics ==
Paracentropogon is characterised by having the body covered in small scales, there is a single spine and 4 soft rays in the pelvic fins. The first spines in the dorsal spine do not form a separate fin and there are no cirri or papillae on the body. The dorsal fin origin is in front of the rear margin of the orbit. There are 14 or 15 spines in the dorsal fin. These fishes do not have teeth on the palatine. The largest species in this genus of small fishes is P. longispinis which has a maximum published total length of 13 cm (5.1 in).

== Distribution ==
Paracentropogon waspfishes are found in the Indo-Pacific region from India eastwards.
