= John Otterbein Snyder =

American ichthyologist and professor of zoology

- Born: August 13, 1867
- Died: August 19, 1943 (aged 76)
- Known for: Notes on the fishes of the streams flowing into San Francisco Bay
- Scientific career
- Fields: Ichthyology
- Institutions: Stanford University

John Otterbein Snyder (August 14, 1867 – August 19, 1943) was an American ichthyologist and professor of zoology at Stanford University.

== History ==
As a student he met David Starr Jordan who inspired him to enter zoology. He eventually became a zoology instructor at Stanford University and served there from 1899 until 1943.

He went on several major collecting expeditions aboard the USS Albatross in the early 1900s and organized the U.S. National Museum's fish collection in 1925. The same year he also declined the directorship there so he could return to Stanford.

He was a long-term member of the California Academy of Sciences and worked for the California Bureau of Fisheries. He wrote many articles and papers as well as describing several new species of sharks.

=== San Francisco Bay ===
In 1905, Snyder, then assistant professor of zoology at Stanford, published Notes on the fishes of the streams flowing into San Francisco Bay in Report of the Commissioner of Fisheries to the Secretary of Commerce and Labor for the fiscal year ending June 30, 1904. This work is significant in its historical documentation of the native fishes of San Francisco Bay channels.

== Legacy ==
Snyder is honored in the name of the waspfish genus Snyderina.

== See also ==
- Taxa named by John Otterbein Snyder
