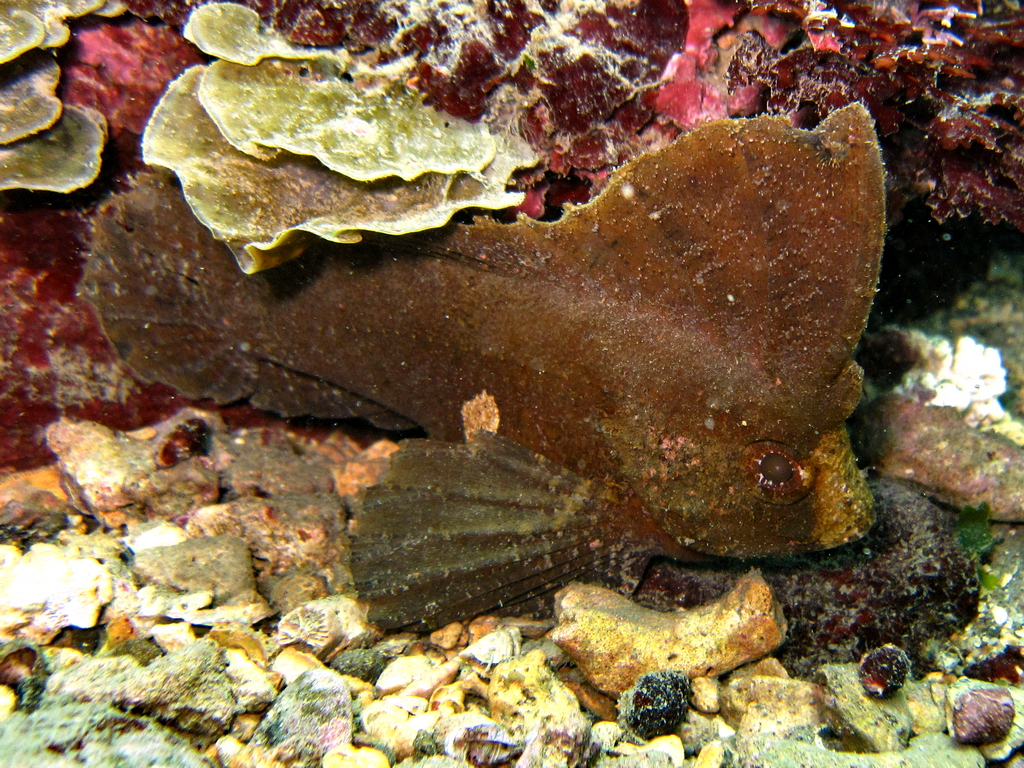

Conservation status
- Least Concern (IUCN 3.1)

Scientific classification
- Kingdom: Animalia
- Phylum: Chordata
- Class: Actinopterygii
- Division: Teleostei
- Order: Perciformes
- Family: Synanceiidae
- Genus: Ablabys
- Species: A. taenianotus

Binomial name
- Ablabys taenianotus (G. Cuvier, 1829)

Synonyms
- Apistus taenianotus Cuvier, 1829; Amblyapistus taenianotus (Cuvier, 1829); Tetraroge cristagalli Günther, 1860; Tetraroge alboguttata Liénard, 1891; Amblyapistus slacksmithi Whitley, 1958

= Ablabys taenianotus =

Species of fish

Ablabys taenianotus, or the cockatoo waspfish, is a small fish species that belongs to the scorpionfishes family Scorpaenidae.

== Description ==
This fish can be up to 6 inches (15 cm) in length. The body compressed laterally, endowed with a dorsal fin starting from the top of the head until joining practically the superior base of the caudal fin. When the dorsal fin is spread, it looks like a crest resembling that of a cockatoo. The thorns of the dorsal fin are venomous. This fish mostly stays on the substratum and moves by means of its pectoral fins. Its color varies from cream to dark brown, with irregular spots.

== Distribution and habitat ==
This species occurs in the tropical West Pacific Ocean, from Malaysia to Japan and from Indonesia to Australia. Ablabys taenianotus lives at depths from 2 to 60 ft (0.6 to 18.2m) on sandy, silty or rubble bottoms, and also in fields of sea grass Zosteraceae.

== Behaviour ==
This species is benthic and nocturnal. It is an opportunistic predator and ambushes passing prey while mimicking a crumpled, dead leaf or a drifting piece of seaweed. It allows itself to drift with the moving water in the way that an inert object would do. It may be found singly or in pairs. The fish feeds on small shrimp and other tiny crustaceans that pass near its mouth.

== Aquarium care ==
These fish are venomous, so caution must be taken when they are handled. They can grow up to 5 or 6 inches (130 or 150 mm) in length and need at least a 30-US-gallon (110 L; 25 imp gal) aquarium. The specific gravity (SG) should be between 1,020 and 1,025, and the temperature should be between 23 and 26 °C (73 and 79 °F). Cockatoo wasp fish are more active at night, which is when they come out and feed. They should only be kept with larger and non threatening tankmates. For the aquarium they need seagrass and sand which is found in their environment. They are sensitive fish so water quality must be excellent. Cockatoo waspfish eat fish, crabs, polychaetes worms, shrimp, jellyfish and medusae. They are also cannibalistic. They need to be fed 2–4 times a week by small amounts every day.

== Bibliographical references ==
- Andrea & Antonnella Ferrrari, "Macrolife", Nautilus publishing, 2003, ISBN 983-2731-00-3
- Ewald Lieske & Robert Myers, "Coral reef fishes", Princeton University Press, 1998, ISBN 978-0691004815
