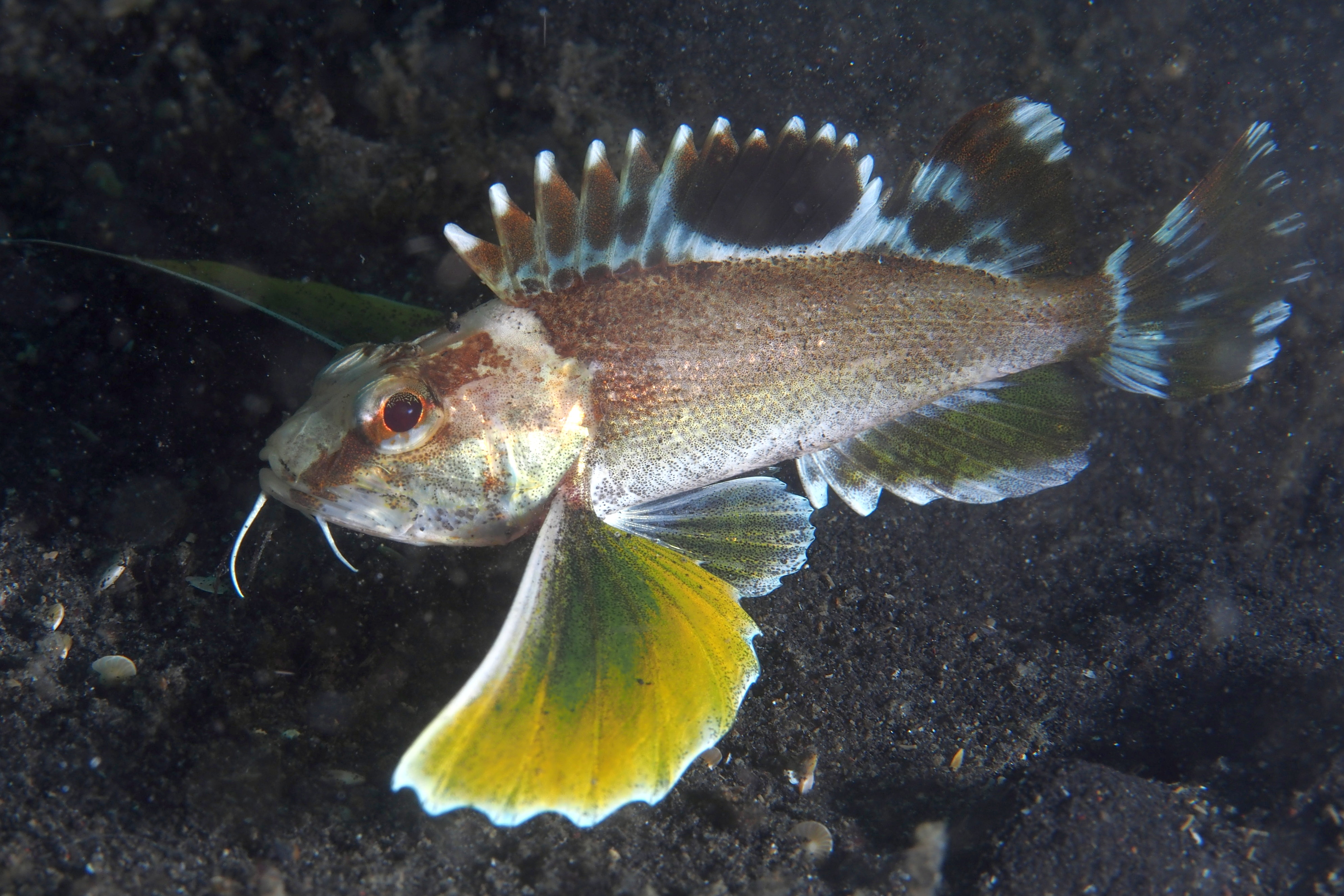

Conservation status
- Least Concern (IUCN 3.1)

Scientific classification
- Kingdom: Animalia
- Phylum: Chordata
- Class: Actinopterygii
- Order: Perciformes
- Family: Synanceiidae
- Subfamily: Apistinae
- Genus: Apistus; G. Cuvier, 1829
- Species: A. carinatus

Binomial name
- Apistus carinatus (Bloch & J. G. Schneider, 1801)

Synonyms
- For genus Apistus: Hypodytes Gistel, 1848; Parapistus Steindachner, 1866; Polemius Kaup, 1858; Prosopodasys Cantor, 1849; Pterichthys Swainson, 1839; For species A. carinatus: Scorpaena carinata Bloch & Schneider, 1801; Hypodytes carinatus (Bloch & Schneider, 1801); Apistus israelitarum Cuvier, 1829; Apistus alatus Cuvier, 1829; Apistus evolans Jordan & Starks, 1904; Apistus venenans Jordan & Starks, 1904; Apistus faurei Gilchrist & Thompson, 1908; Apistus balnearum Ogilby, 1910; Apistus macrolepidotus Ogily, 1910

= Apistus =

Species of fish

Apistus is a monotypic genus of marine ray-finned fish belonging to the subfamily Apistinae, the wasp scorpionfishes, part of the family Scorpaenidae, the scorpionfishes and their relatives. Its only species is the Apistus carinatus, which has the common names ocellated waspfish, bearded waspfish, longfin waspfish or ringtailed cardinalfish. It has a wide Indo-Pacific distribution. This species has venom-bearing spines in its fins.

== Taxonomy ==
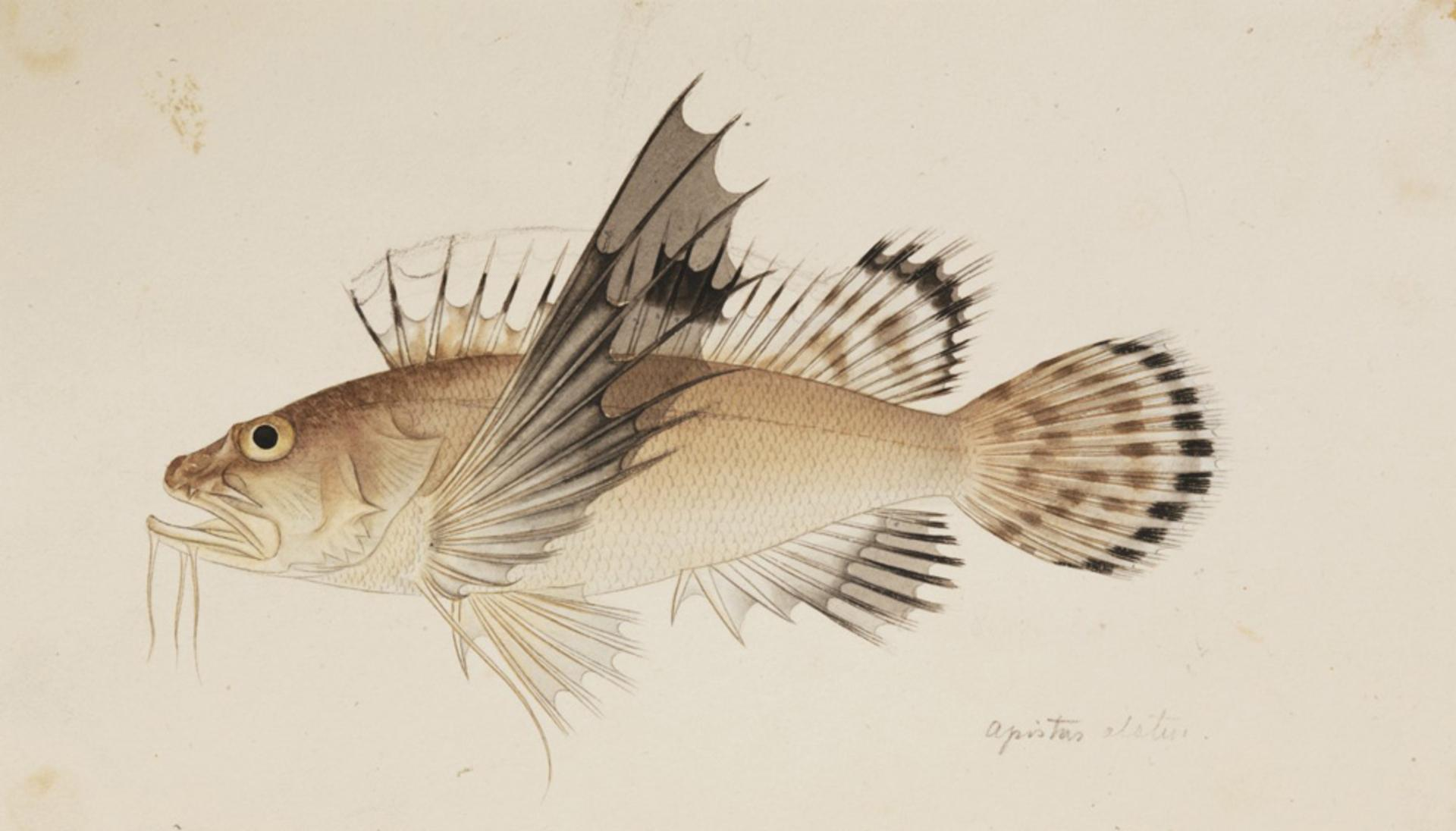
Illustration (1823–1829) by Kawahara Keiga

Apistus was first described as a genus in 1829 by the French zoologist Georges Cuvier. He was describing the species Apistus alatus, which was designated as the type species of the genus Apistus in 1876 by Pieter Bleeker. A. alatus is a junior synonym of A. carinatus, which had been described by the German naturalists Marcus Elieser Bloch and Johann Gottlob Schneider in 1801 as Scorpaena carinata, with its type locality given as Tranquebar in India.

The genus Apistus is classified within the subfamily Apistinae, within the family Scorpaenidae.

=== Etymology ===
The genus name, Apistus, means "untrustworthy" or "perfidious", a name Cuvier explained as being due to the long and mobile spines around the eyes, which he described as "very offensive weapons that these fish use when you least expect it". The specific name, carinatus, means "keeled", presumed to be an allusion to the bony ridges on the head.

== Description ==
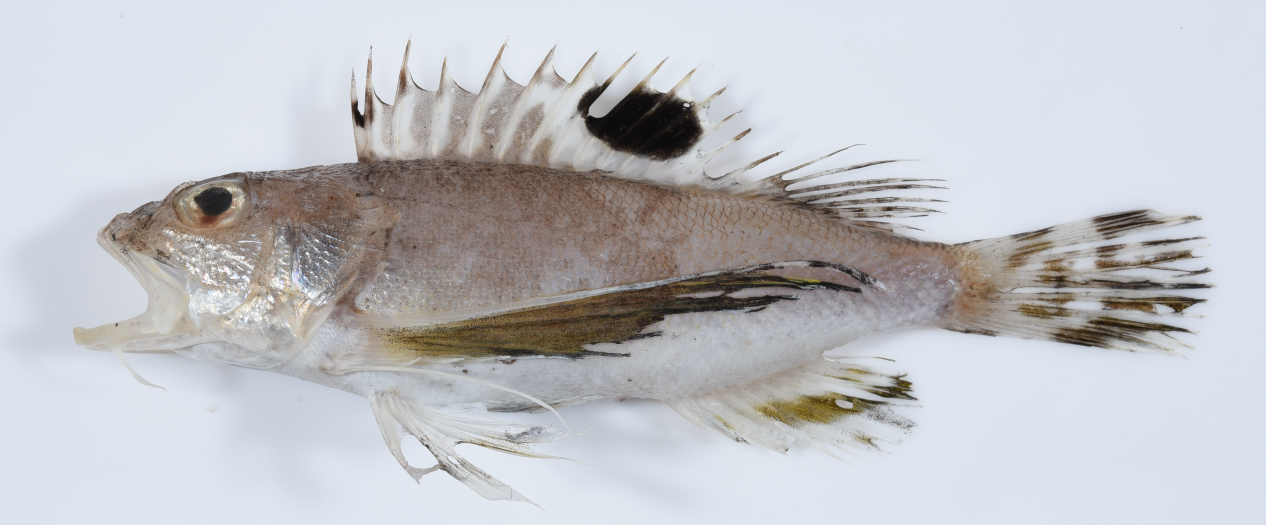
Specimen

Apistus carinatus has a moderately elongated and compressed body. The lateral surface of the head is armed with a dense covering of bony ridges or keels. The rearmost pectoral fin ray is separate from the rest of the fin. There are between 14 and 16 spines and between 8 and 10 soft rays in the dorsal fin, with 3 or 4 spines and 6 to 8 soft rays in the anal fin. The overall colour is bluish to pinkish-grey, with a large black ocellus on the rear of the spiny part of the dorsal fin. The long pectoral fins are yellow, and there are sensory barbels on the chin. The ocellated waspfish attains a maximum total length of 20 cm (7.9 in) but 10 cm (3.9 in) is more typical.

== Distribution and habitat ==
Apistus carinatus has a wide distribution in the Indian and Pacific oceans. It occurs from the Red Sea south along the eastern coast of Africa to South Africa, east along the coasts of the Arabian Sea and into the Andaman Sea into the Pacific Ocean as far as the Philippines, north to the Bonin Islands and waters off Kyushu of Japan, and south to Australia. In Australian waters, this species occurs from Shark Bay in Western Australia around the northern coast and south as far as off Newcastle in New South Wales on the east coast. This species is a demersal fish which can be found at depths between 14 and 16 m (46 and 52 ft), although a more typical range is 15 to 50 m (49 to 164 ft), on sandy or silty substrates.

== Biology ==
Apistus carinatus is a nocturnal predator which spends the day buried in the sand, only exposing its eyes. If it is disturbed, the long pectoral fins are spread and their bright yellow colour is used to deter predators. It also uses these fins to corner prey, and the sensitive barbels on the chin are able to detect pret buried in sand or mud. The spines in the dorsal and anal fins bear a venom gland.

== Utilisation ==
Apistus carinatus is a small, venomous fish and is of little interest to fisheries, but it is caught in the Persian Gulf in trawl nets and sometimes in seine nets, and in Australia as a bycatch in prawn fisheries.
