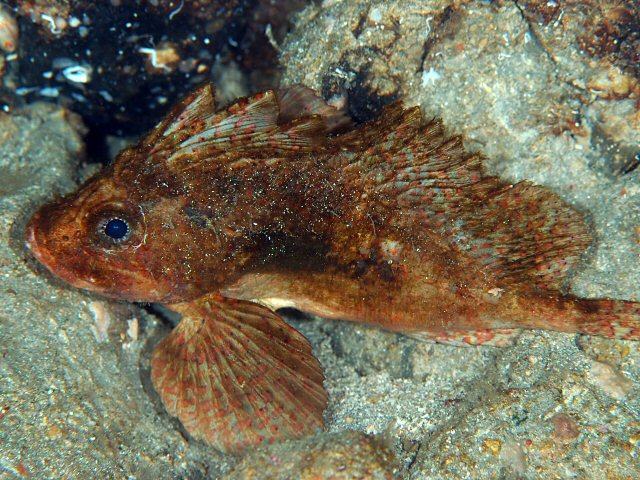
- Snyderina yamanokami

Scientific classification
- Kingdom: Animalia
- Phylum: Chordata
- Class: Actinopterygii
- Order: Perciformes
- Family: Synanceiidae
- Subfamily: Tetraroginae; J. L. B. Smith, 1949

Genera
- See text

= Tetraroginae =

Waspfishes

Subfamily of fishes

Tetraroginae is a subfamily of marine ray-finned fishes, commonly known as waspfishes or sailback scorpionfishes, belonging to the family Scorpaenidae, the scorpionfishes and their relatives. These fishes are native to the Indian Ocean and the West Pacific. As their name suggests, waspfishes are often venomous; having poison glands on their spines. They are bottom-dwelling fish, living at depths to 300 metres (980 ft). These creatures usually live in hiding places on the sea bottom.

== Taxonomy and etymology ==
Tetraroginae, or Tetrarogidae, was first formally recognised as a taxonomic grouping in 1949 by the South African ichthyologist J. L. B. Smith. The 5th edition of Fishes of the World treats this as a subfamily of the scorpionfish family Scorpaenidae, however other authorities treat it as a valid family, the Tetrarogidae. A recent study placed the waspfishes into an expanded stonefish clade, within the family Synanceiidae, because all of these fish have a lachrymal sabre that can project a switch-blade-like mechanism out from underneath their eye.

The name of the subfamily is based on the genus name Tetraroge, which was described in 1860 by Albert Günther and its name means "four clefts", an allusion to the four clfts in the gills in comparison to the five clefts in the gills of Pentaroge, now regarded as a synonym of Gymnapistes.

== Genera ==
The following genera are classified within the subfamily Tetraroginae:

- Genus Ablabys Kaup, 1873
- Genus Centropogon Gunther, 1860
- Genus Coccotropsis Barnard, 1927
- Genus Cottapistus Bleeker, 1876
- Genus Glyptauchen Gunther, 1860
- Genus Gymnapistes Swainson, 1839
- Genus Liocranium Ogilby, 1903
- Genus Neocentropogon Matsubara, 1943
- Genus Neovespicula Mandrytsa, 2001
- Genus Notesthes Ogilby, 1903
- Genus Ocosia Jordan & Starks, 1904
- Genus Paracentropogon Bleeker, 1876
- Genus Pseudovespicula Mandrytsa, 2001
- Genus Richardsonichthys J. L. B. Smith, 1958
- Genus Snyderina Jordan & Starks, 1901
- Genus Tetraroge Gunther, 1860
- Genus Vespicula Jordan & Richardson, 1910

The genus Vespicula is not universally recognised, its type species is Apistus trachinoides, which some workers have placed in the monotypic genus Trichosomus Swainson, 1839 with the two remaining species being classified within the genus Pseudovespicula.

== Characteristics ==
Tetraroginae waspfishes have compressed bodies with heads typically with ridges and spines. The spines on the operculum are divergent and the gill membrane is free from isthmus. There is a large mobile spine below each eye which may be projected outwards. The venom borne on the spines of these fishes is very potent. They are small fish, from 2.5–23 cm (1–9 in).

== Distribution and habitat ==
Tetraroginae waspfishes are almost all found in the Indian and western Pacific Ocean, the exception is the smoothskin scorpionfish (Coccotropsis gymnoderma) found in the southeastern Atlantic off South Africa. They are demersal fishes, mostly marine, but some species will live in brackish water with one, the bullrout (Notesthes robusta) spending much of its life in the freshwater reaches of rivers. Tetraroge nigra, sometimes called the freshwater waspfish, may also be found in freshwater, although it is primarily brackish.

== Biology ==
Tetraroginae waspfishes are extremely venomous and the wounds inflicted by the spines can be extremely painful and may even be dangerous. They are predatory fishes, which feed on crustaceans and fishes.
