= Veragromovia =

Veragromovia Temporal range: Middle or Late Eocene
- Illustration (top view) of the type tooth (IP AN GruzSSR 3-V) of V. desmatotheroides

Scientific classification
- Kingdom: Animalia
- Phylum: Chordata
- Class: Mammalia
- Order: Perissodactyla
- Family: †Rhodopagidae
- Genus: †Veragromovia; Gabunia, 1961
- Species: †V. desmatotheroides

Binomial name
- †Veragromovia desmatotheroides Gabunia, 1961

Extinct genus of mammals

Veragromovia is an extinct genus of rhodopagid that lived in Central Asia during the Middle or Late Eocene. Like other rhodopagids, Veragromovia was a small and primitive ceratomorph. A single species of Veragromovia is recognized, V. desmatheroides, known from a single isolated molar found in Kazakhstan. The genus is named in honor of the Soviet paleontologist Vera Gromova.

== Research history ==
Veragromovia desmatotheroides was described by Leo Gabunia in 1961, based on a single isolated third upper molar (IP AN GruzSSR 3-V) from the Middle or Late Eocene Obayla Formation, along the Obayla River in the Zaysan Basin of eastern Kazakhstan.

== Classification ==
In 1965, Leonard Radinsky noted that the type tooth of V. desmatotheroides appeared to be "extremely similar" to teeth of the North American Helaletes nanus, being of similar size and having a similar cusp pattern. Radinsky believed that Veragromovia may not be generically distinct from Helaletes, but that additional fossils were required to establish whether Veragromovia was a junior synonym. Subsequent authors in the 1960s, 70s, 80s, and 90s largely followed Radinsky, and treated Veragromovia as a synonym of Helaletes.

In 1997, Jerry J. Hooker and Demberelyin Dashzeveg showed that the supposed similarities to the molars of Helaletes were largely features that are primitive to both rhinocerotoids and tapiroids, rather than features specific to Helaletes. Hooker and Dashzeveg found that the molar of Veragromovia includes several features that place it close to Rhodopagus and Pataecops, such as a relatively high tooth crown, a quite lingually placed metacone, the presence of a complete lingual cingulum, and a broad and U-shaped central valley. On the basis of these features, Hooker and Dashzeveg restored Veragromovia as a distinct genus, and classified it in the family Rhodopagidae. Hooker and Dahszeveg noted that Veragromovia differs from Rhodopagus and Pataecops in that it retains a distinct parastyle, and that its metaloph is not higher than its protoloph. These differences are also found in "Rhodopagus" radinskyi, a species they argued should be assigned to a new genus, from which Veragromovia differs in its larger size. Subsequent authors have continued to regard Veragromovia as a valid genus.
