= Pataecops =

Pataecops Temporal range: Early Eocene (Bumbanian), 56–52.1 Ma
- Illustration (top view) of the tooth series (third molar to second premolar) of the type specimen (AMNH 21747) of P. parvus

Scientific classification
- Kingdom: Animalia
- Phylum: Chordata
- Class: Mammalia
- Order: Perissodactyla
- Family: †Rhodopagidae
- Genus: †Pataecops; Radinsky, 1966

Type species
- †Pataecops parvus (Radinsky, 1965)

Other species
- †P. minutissimus (Reshetov, 1979)

Synonyms
- Genus synonymy: Pataecus Radinsky, 1965 (preoccupied); Synonyms of P. minutissimus: P. microdon Reshetov, 1979; Rhodopagus minutissimus Reshetov, 1979; Synonyms of P. parvus: Pataecus parvus Radinsky, 1965

Extinct genus of mammals

Pataecops is an extinct genus of rhodopagid that lived in Central and East Asia during the Early Eocene, in the Bumbanian land mammal age. Like other rhodopagids, Pataecops was a small and primitive ceratomorph. Two species of Pataecops are recognized, the type species P. parvus, known from both Mongolia and Inner Mongolia, China, and the smaller P. minutissimus, known from Kyrgyzstan. The genus derives its name from the ancient Phoenician deity Pataikos, which the paleontologist Leonard Radinsky characterized as "odd-shaped" and "dwarf-like".

== Research history ==
Pataecops was originally described under the name Pataecus, derived from the ancient Phoenician deity Pataikos, which Leonard Radinsky described as an "odd-shaped" and "dwarf-like" figure. This name alludes to the very small size of the animal. Pataecus parvus was described by Leonard Radinsky in 1965, based on a partial maxilla (AMNH 21747), preserving the second premolar to third molar, found in the Kholobolchi Formation of Mongolia. Radinsky compared the upper molars of P. parvus to those of Rhodopagus, and found that they share the same highly unique cusp pattern, with oblique and inverted U- to V-shaped shearing lophs, and metacones parellal to, or confluent with, the metalophs. The molars of P. parvus were more specialized than those of Rhodopagus, with shorter metalophs as well as longer and more lingually displaced ectolophs. The species name parvus is Latin for "little", in reference to the small size of the animal. The name Pataecus is preoccupied by the fish genus Pataecus. In 1966, Radinsky thus amended the name of the extinct perissodactyl genus to Pataecops.

In 1979, Valeriy Yurievich Reshetov described the new species Rhodopagus minutissimus and Pataecops microdon, from fossils found at Andarak in Kyrgyzstan. The first and second molars of the type specimen of R. minutissimus (PIN 3486-1) has considerably lingually placed ectolophs, which differentiates it from Rhodopagus, but places it close to Pataecops parvus. The ectoloph structure in the R. minutissimus molars differ from those of P. parvus in being more labially concave, and having slightly less reduced metalophs. Additional fossils from Andarak, described by Alexander Averianov and Marc Godinot in 2005, showed that these features were variable. Among the fossils described by Averianov and Godinot were a second molar with a labially concave ectoloph, associated with a third molar typical of Pataecops. Averianov and Godinot referred R. minutissimus to Pataecops (as P. minutissimus). In 1991, Demberelyin Dashzeveg argued that P. microdon belonged to neither Pataecops nor Rhodopagus, due to its small size and the shape of its tooth crown. Averianov and Godinot showed that the type specimen of P. microdon (PIN 3486-2) was within the range of variation of P. minutissimus, and they thus designated it as a synonym of that species. P. minutissimus differs from P. parvus in its smaller size, lack of a labial cingulum on the third and fourth pairs of premolars, and its more variable molars. P. minutissimus is the smallest known ceratomorph found, with its molar series measuring just over 17 millimetres (0.67 in) long.

In 2011, Wang Yuan-Qing and colleagues described additional P. parvus fossils from the Nomogen Formation of Inner Mongolia, China.

== Classification ==
In 1965, Radinsky provisionally classified both Pataecops and Rhodopagus in the tapiroid family Lophialetidae. Radinsky considered it possible that Pataecops and Rhodopagus had evolved from a primitive lophialetid, a family with which they share long ectolophs, but noted that no intermediate forms are known, and that the small size and functionally bilophodont dentition of Pataecops and Rhodopagus does not fit with the evolutionary trends otherwise seen in Lophialetidae. In 1975, Reshetov distinguished Rhodopagus and Pataecops within Lophialetidae as the subfamily Rhodopaginae.

In 1981, Spencer G. Lucas and Robert M. Schoch argued that Rhodopagus more appropriately belonged in the rhinocerotoid family Hyracodontidae, and noted that Pataecops in this case must also necessarily be a hyracodont. Rhodopaginae, including Rhodopagus and Pataecops, was raised to the status of a distinct family (Rhodopagidae) by Jerry J. Hooker in 1989, who placed it as a sister group of Deperetellidae, both classified as primitive ceratomorph groups not part of either Tapiroidea or Rhinocerotoidea. In 1997, Hooker and Dashzeveg concluded, contrary to Hooker's previous assessment, that rhodopagids were rhinocerotoids. Among the features used to demonstrate this, the most important were a distinct break between the metaconule and protoconule, seen in rhinocerotoids but not tapiroids, and that the rhodopagid "Rhodopagus" radinskyi does not show any sign of a major narial incision which typifies nearly all tapiroids (other than Heptodon). In 2005, Averianov and Godinot agreed with Hooker and Dashzeveg's conclusions, and classified Rhodopagidae in Rhinocerotoidea. Phylogenetic analyses by Bin Bai and colleagues in 2020 recovered rhodopagids as relatively basal ceratomorphs, either inside Tapiroidea or as close relatives of Rhinocerotoidea, depending on the method used.
