= Verrucotoxin =

Lethal venom produced by Synanceia verrucosa

Verrucotoxin (VTX) is a lethal venom produced by the dorsal fins of Synanceia verrucosa. This species of reef stonefish is connected to the family Synanceiidae. The venom of this species of stonefish is a tetrameric glycoprotein with cardiovascular and cytolytic effects.

== Structure ==
The structure of verrucotoxin is a tetrameric protein with a molecular weight of 322 KDa; the protein consists of two parts of an alpha subunit (83 KDa) and two parts of a beta subunit (78 KDa). Verrucotoxin shares a total of 96% homology to the closely related venom stonustoxin beta subunit. Stonustoxin is the venom produced from Synanceia horrida.

== Function and mechanism ==
Verrucotoxin has been studied to interact with both calcium ion channels and potassium ATP channels. The calcium ion channel is modulated by the activation of the β-adrenoceptors when verrucotoxin binds. There are three subunits of β-adrenoceptors, β1, β2, and β3, but only β2-adrenoceptors are responsible for the activation of the cyclic adenosine monophosphate (cAMP)-protein kinase (PKA) pathway. The cAMP will phosphorylate muscle regulatory proteins and modulate intercellular calcium concentrations. It is through this method that verrucotoxin operates the concentrations of calcium in the cell. Verrucotoxin is a concentration-dependent toxin to the concentration of calcium ions; the presence of verrucotoxin can increase the calcium concentration three times the standard intercellular concentration. Additionally, verrucotoxin has been observed to cause a reversible prolonged action potential duration with zero change in resting membrane potential from ventricular myocytes in guinea pigs.

The second method verrucotoxin disrupts cells are through potassium ion channels, particularly the potassium adenosine triphosphate (KATP) pathway. The potassium ATP channel operates by pumping potassium ions out of the intercellular membrane. It’s capable of doing so by phosphorylating the channel with adenosine triphosphate (ATP). Verrucotoxin is able to inhibit the operation of the potassium ATP through the activation of muscarinic M3 receptor-protein kinase C (PKC). It is the activation of the PKC that will inhibit the potassium ion channel. The PKC is presumably phosphorylating the KATP channel instead of ATP.

== Adverse effects ==
The stonefish, Synanceia verrucosa, has a diverse set of toxins that disrupts basic human ability. When injected with the toxins found in the dorsal fins of the fish, individuals will suffer from skeletal muscle paralysis, extreme pain, seizures, convulsions, respiratory arrest, and damage to the cardiovascular system. Verrucotoxin has been studied to be the cause of cardiovascular system damage, convulsions, seizures, and paralysis. For the cardiovascular system damage, it is caused by the sudden change in the intercellular calcium concentration leading to arrhythmia. The direct cause of seizures, convulsions, and paralysis are still being investigated.
