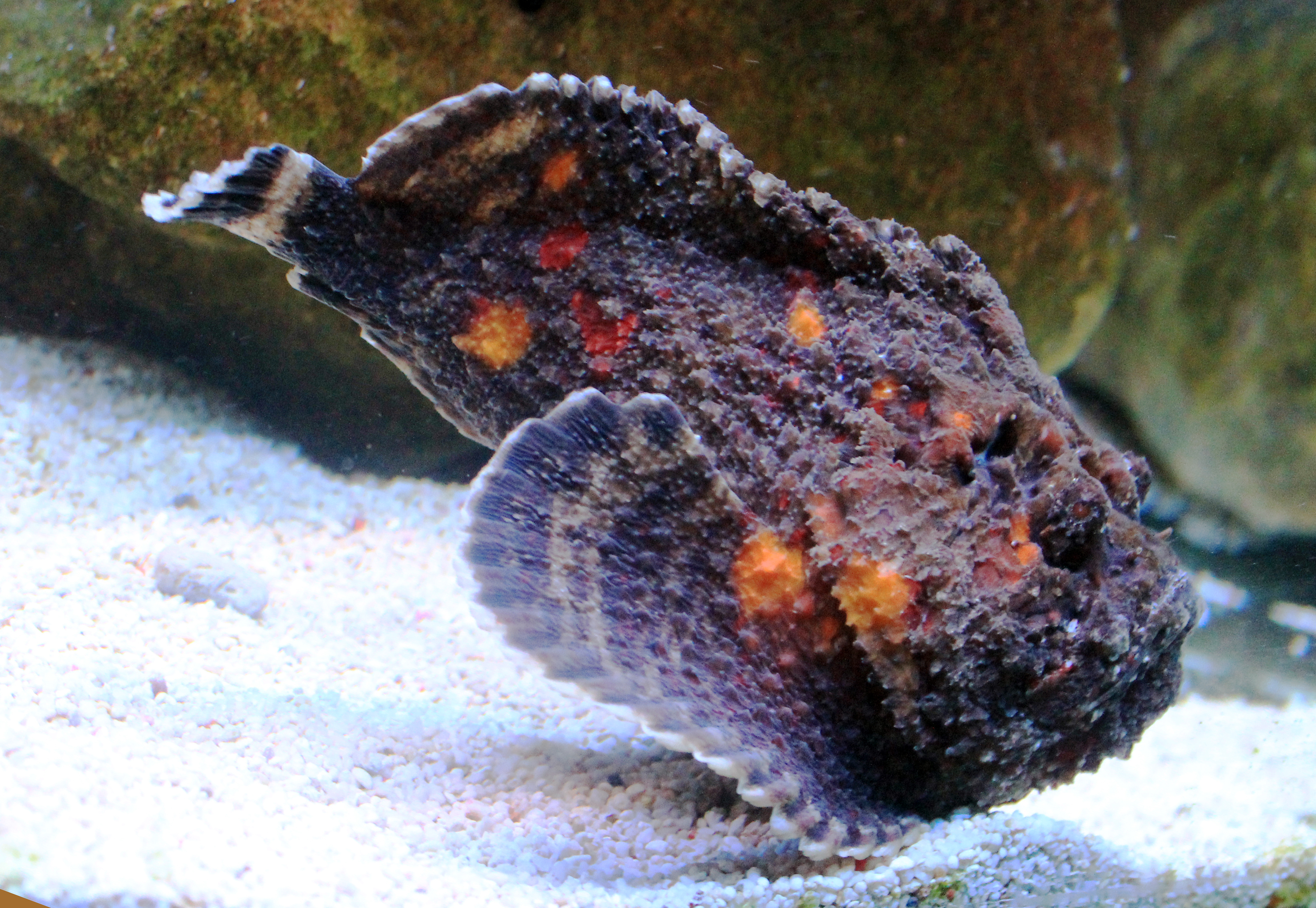
- Reef stonefish in an aquarium in Prague

Conservation status
- Least Concern (IUCN 3.1)

Scientific classification
- Kingdom: Animalia
- Phylum: Chordata
- Class: Actinopterygii
- Order: Perciformes
- Family: Synanceiidae
- Genus: Synanceia
- Species: S. verrucosa

Binomial name
- Synanceia verrucosa Bloch & J. G. Schneider, 1801

Synonyms
- Synanceichthys verrucosa (Bloch & Schneider, 1801); Synanceichthys verrucosus (Bloch & Schneider, 1801); Scorpaena brachion Lacépède, 1801; Synanceia brachio Cuvier, 1829; Synanceia thersites Seale, 1901

= Synanceia verrucosa =

Reef Stonefish Temporal range: Miocene to recent

Species of fish

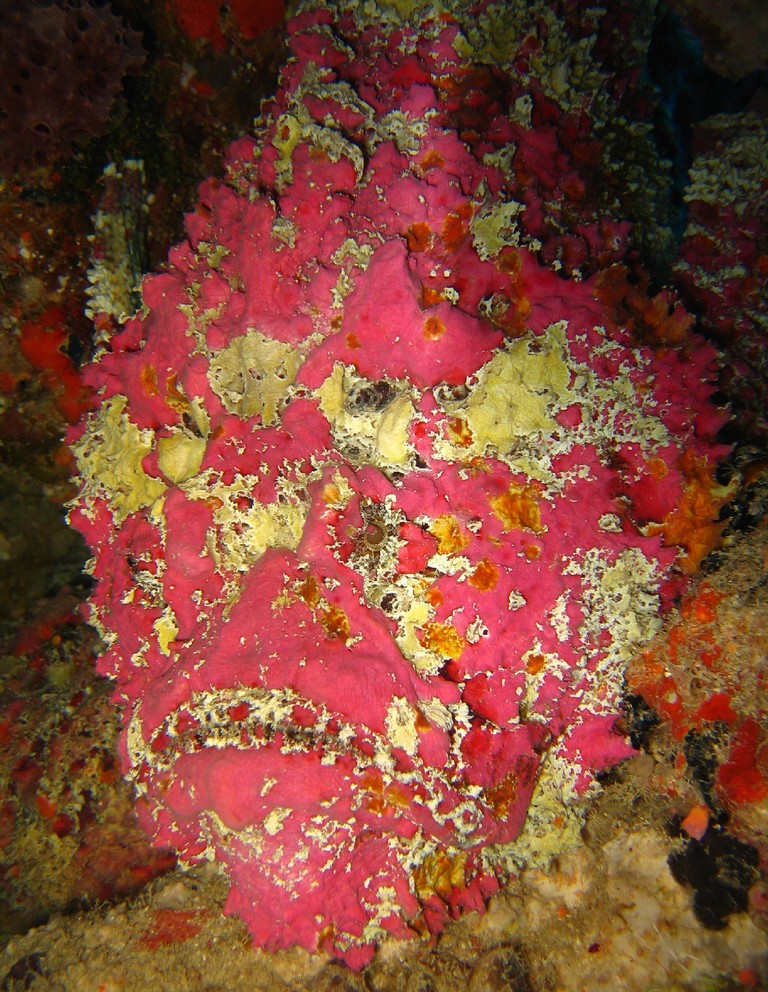
Reef stonefish in the Great Barrier Reef Marine Park

Synanceia verrucosa, the reef stonefish, is a species of venomous, marine ray-finned fish, belonging to the subfamily Synanceiinae, which is classified as being within the family Scorpaenidae, the scorpionfishes and their relatives. It is the most widespread species of stonefish, mostly found in shallow waters of the Red Sea and the Indo-Pacific. It possesses highly effective venom that can kill humans. It is the type species of Synanceia.

== Taxonomy ==
Synanceia verrucosa was first formally described in 1801 by the German naturalists Marcus Elieser Bloch and Johann Gottlob Theaenus Schneider with the type locality given as India. Bloch and Schneider described a new genus, Synanceia, for this species, but in 1856 Eugène Anselme Sébastien Léon Desmarest designated Scorpaena horrida which had been described by Carl Linnaeus in 1766, as the type species of Synanceia. The specific name verrucosa means "covered with verrucas or warts", an allusion to the warty growths all over its body.

== Description ==
Synanceia verrucosa are usually brown or grey, and may have areas of yellow, orange, or red. The dorsal fin contains between 12 and 14 spines and 5 and 7 soft rays while the anal fin has 3 spines and 5 or 6 soft rays. The dorsal spines are of equal length with a thicker sheath of skin containing the venom glands at their base. The skin has no scales but there are numerous warts. The pectoral fins are fleshy. The head is wide and flattened. The skin is tough and rough with warts. The small upwardly directed eyes have a deep pit behind them with a smaller pit underneath them. This species reaches a maximum recorded total length of 40 cm (16 in) but 27 cm (11 in) is more typical.

== Distribution and habitat ==
This stonefish lives primarily north of the Tropic of Capricorn. It is the most widespread species in the stonefish family, and is known from shallow tropical marine waters in the western Pacific Ocean and the Indian Ocean, ranging from the Red Sea and coastal East Africa to French Polynesia, southern Japan and surrounding Taiwan.

There is recent evidence showing the presence of S. verrucosa in the far eastern Mediterranean Sea since at least 2010 as one was caught near Yavne, Israel – an introduction due either to the release of aquarium specimens or to migrations via the Suez Canal. It has since been observed in Turkey, Lebanon, Syria and Israel.

This fish lives in coral reefs. It may settle on and around rocks and plants, or rest on the seabed.

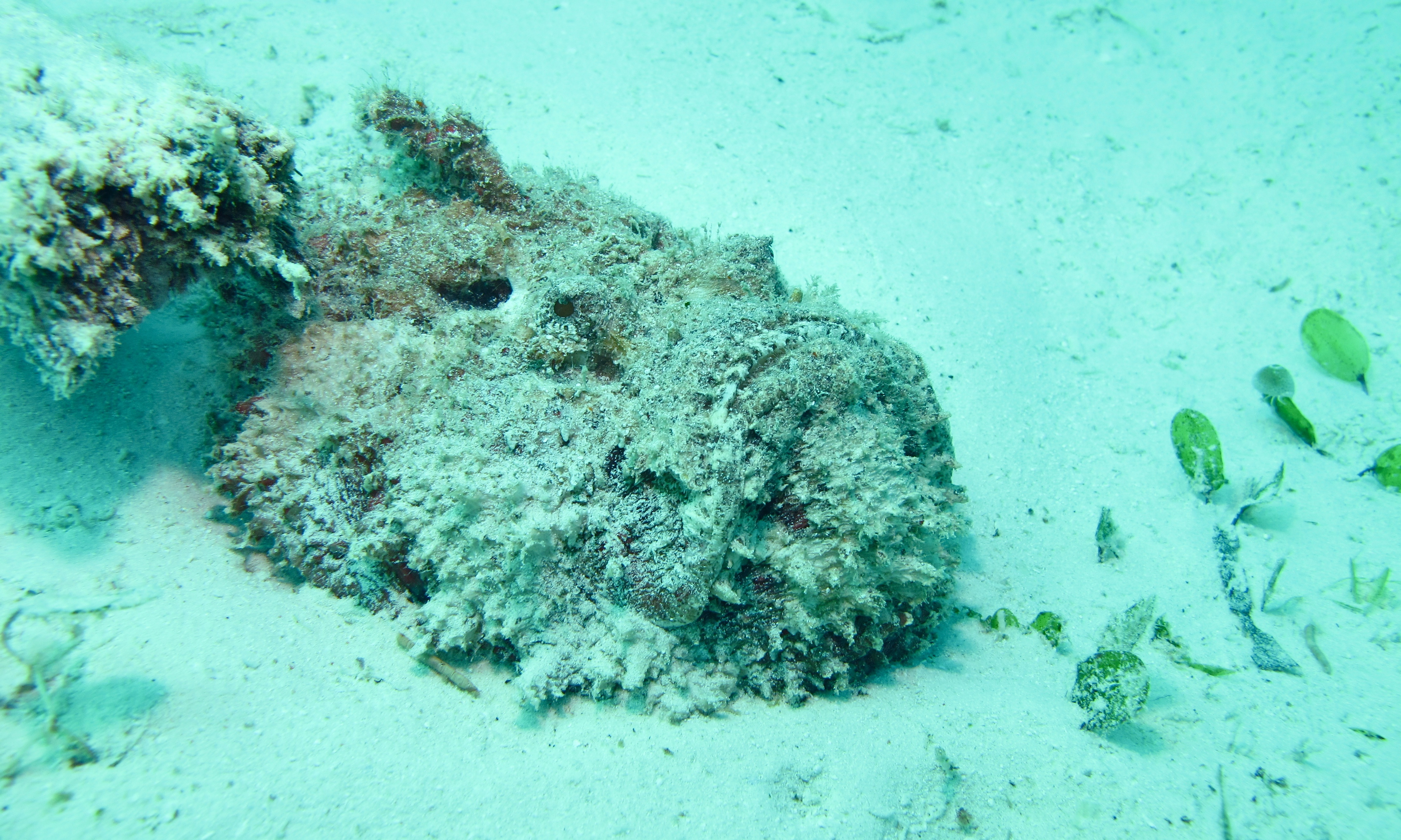
Reef stonefish on the reef floor

The reef stonefish has evolved many adaptations to help them succeed in the reef bottom. Their skin texture and color is highly irregular which helps them hide and remain camouflaged when among rocks and corals. The 13 dorsal spines with attendant venom sacs are an additional adaptation that protect the animal when necessary.

== Feeding ==
The reef stonefish eats mostly small fish, shrimp and other crustaceans. It captures prey by sitting motionless on the reef floor and waiting for animals to swim by. The stonefish will then engulf its prey, doing so at incredible speeds. Some stonefish have been recorded striking their prey in 0.015 seconds.

== Human uses ==
The primary commercial significance of this stonefish is as an aquarium pet. It is also sold for meat in Southern China markets. It is consumed in the Philippines, especially in Chinese restaurants, and in Japan.

== Toxicity ==
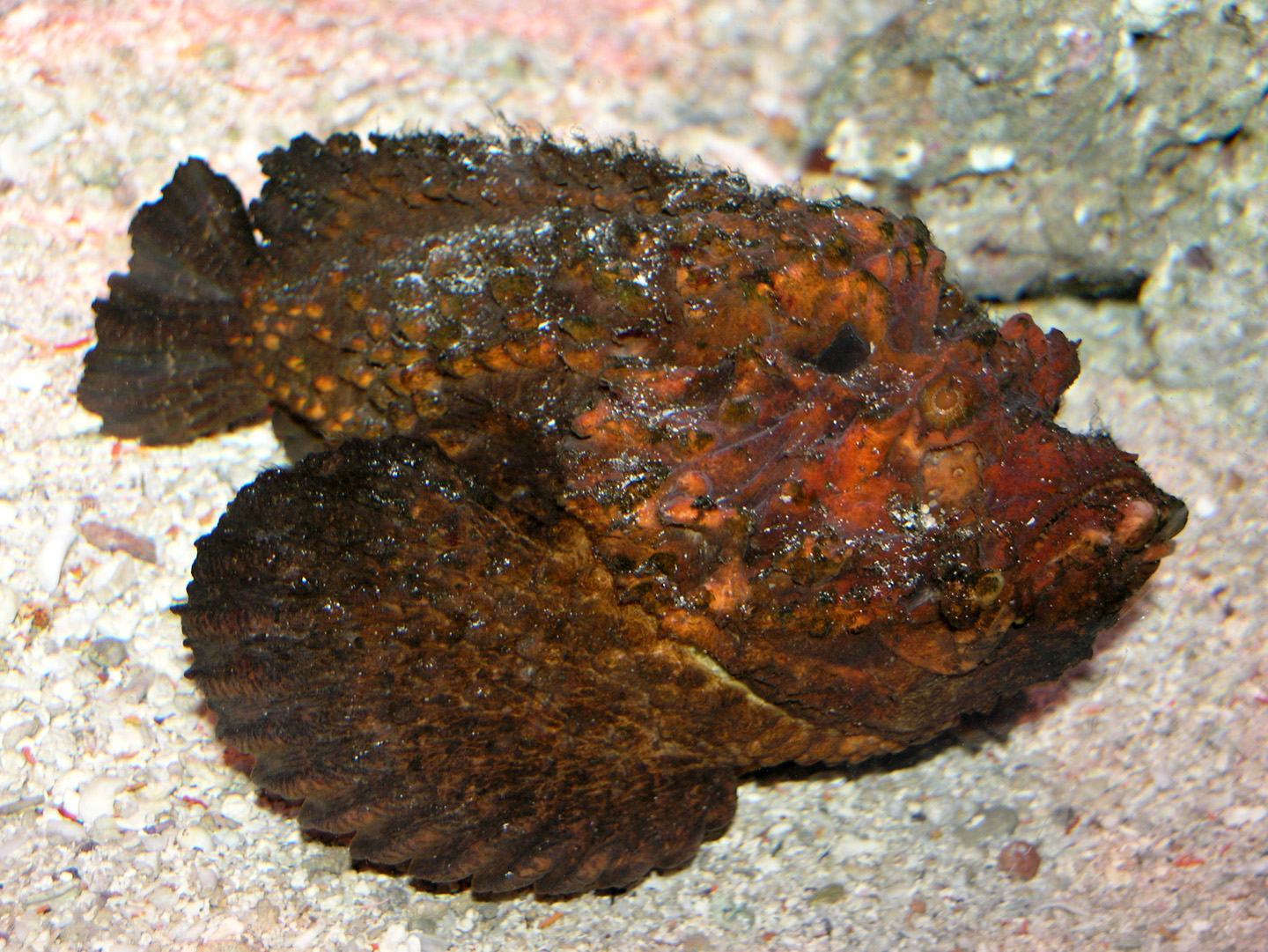
Synanceia verrucosa in a public aquarium

The reef stonefish is the most venomous fish in the world. Its dorsal area is lined with 13 spines, each of which has two venom sacs. The spines are sharp and stiff and have been known to pierce boot soles. Stonefish venom can be fatal at a dose of only 18 mg, which the fish is capable of releasing with only six of its thirteen spines. The protein makeup differs between the three species of stonefish, but in reef stonefish the fatal protein is the verrucotoxin protein.

Effects of the venom include severe pain, shock, paralysis, and tissue death. A large dose can be fatal to humans, generally young children, the elderly, and those with weakened immune systems. Medical treatment includes the antivenom. A local anesthetic can reduce the pain. First aid includes immersion of the affected limb in hot water; this is thought to help denature the proteins in the venom. The immobilization of venom at penetration site using a tourniquet or firm constrictive bandaging is no longer recommended. Surviving victims may have nerve damage, which can lead to local muscle atrophy.

The venom consists of a mixture of proteins, including the hemolytic stonustoxin, the proteinaceous verrucotoxin, and the cardiotoxic cardioleputin.

== Reproduction ==
The reef stonefish lives most of its life as a solitary animal, and during mating season only aggregates with the opposite sex for a short time. When a female stonefish has reached sexual maturity, she will lay her unfertilized eggs on the floor of the reef. A male will then swim by and release sperm onto the layer of eggs, fertilizing them. Stonefish eggs are fairly large, with young fish hatching well developed. The mating system of the reef stonefish is promiscuity, as the female will not discriminate between which males can lay their sperm on the egg layer. Sexual dimorphism is apparent in reef stonefish, with females being larger than males.
