= Rhodopagidae =

Rhodopagids Temporal range: Eocene
- Fossil jaw of Rhodopagus

Scientific classification
- Kingdom: Animalia
- Phylum: Chordata
- Class: Mammalia
- Order: Perissodactyla
- Suborder: Ceratomorpha
- Family: †Rhodopagidae; Reshetov, 1975

Genera
- †Pataecops; †Rhodopagus; †Veragromovia

Extinct family of odd-toed ungulates

Rhodopagidae is an extinct family of poorly known primitive and small ceratomorph perissodactyls (odd-toed ungulates), known from the Eocene of Asia. Dentally, rhodopagids are characterized by the loss of the first pair of premolars, and by distinct buccal (towards the interior of the mouth) crests on their third pair of premolars.

The classification of rhodopagids is unclear. They were originally treated as tapiroids, placed in the family Lophialetidae. Several features appear to ally rhodopagids closer to rhinocerotoids. In 1981 they were proposed to belong to Hyracodontidae; subsequent authors have treated them as more primitive rhinocerotoids, Rhinocerotoidea incertae sedis, or as more basal ceratomorphs. Most rhodopagids are known from relatively fragmentary dental and jaw material, and modern phylogenetic analyses have been inconclusive in respect to their systematic position.

== Research history ==
Rhodopagid fossils were first described by William Diller Matthew and Walter W. Granger in 1925, in the form of Rhodopagus minimus (originally described as a species of Caenolophus). In 1965, Leonard Radinsky established Rhodopagus as a distinct genus, and described another genus, Pataecops. Both genera were characterized by a unique combination of dental features, which made them difficult to classify beyond being closely related to each other. The original fossils of Rhodopagus and Pataecops were found in Mongolia and Inner Mongolia (China). Over the course of the later 1960s, 70s, and 80s, additional rhodopagid fossils were found in China, Mongolia, and Central Asia.

In 1997, Jerry J. Hooker and Demberelyin Dashzeveg defined Rhodopagidae by the loss of the first pair of premolars, and by the presence of high and straight, continuous buccal (towards the interior of the mouth) crests on the upper and lower third pairs of premolars. The genus Veragromovia, named in 1961 based on a single tooth from Kazakhstan, had been designated as a probable synonym of the helaletid Helaletes in 1965. Hooker and Dashzeveg restored Veragromovia as a distinct genus, which they classified as a third genus in Rhodopagidae. Most rhodopagids are known from fragmentary jaw and dental material. The sole exception is "Rhodopagus" radinskyi, known from a nearly complete skull. "R." radinskyi probably belongs to a yet to be named, distinct rhodopagid genus.

The genus Yimengia, described in 1988, was originally considered to be close to Rhodopagus based on features such as a short premolar row, and the loss of the first pair of premolars. In 1989, Hooker and Dashzeveg noted that its relations to Rhodopagidae were uncertain, since Yimengia lacks buccal crests on its premolars, and several other features seen in most of the rhodopagid fossils. Yimengia has since been treated as Rhinocerotoidea incertae sedis, rather than as a rhodopagid.

== Classification ==
Illustration of the molar of Veragromovia

Rhodopagids were primitive ceratomorphs, the perissodactyl lineage that includes rhinocerotoids and tapiroids. Historically, Rhinocerotoidea and Tapiroidea have been conceptualized differently by different authors, which has led different paleontologists to classify certain ceratomorph families in wildly different positions.

In 1965, Radinsky classified Rhodopagus and Pataecops as tapiroids, and noted that they had a lower dentition similar to that of Dilophodon (Helaletidae), but a highly unique upper dentition. Radinsky provisionally placed Rhodopagus and Pataecops in the family Lophialetidae, noting that their dentition could conceivably have evolved from primitive lophialetids. In 1975, Valeriy Yurievich Reshetov distinguished Rhodopagus and Pataecops within Lophialetidae as the subfamily Rhodopaginae. In 1981, Spencer G. Lucas and Robert M. Schoch reclassified Rhodopagus and Pataecops as rhinocerotoids, in the family Hyracodontidae, but based this largely on characteristics later shown to be present in other rhinocerotoid families, and in some cases also tapiroids. In 1986, Donald Prothero and colleagues also placed Rhodopagidae in Rhinocerotoidea, but in a trichotomy with Hyracodontidae and Rhinocerotidae. In 1989, Hooker raised Rhodopaginae to the status of a distinct family (Rhodopagidae), which he placed as a sister group of Deperetellidae. Hooker classified Rhodopagidae and Deperetellidae as stem-ceratomorphs, outside Tapiroidea and Rhinocerotoidea. In the 1991 description of "Rhodopagus" radinskyi, Leo Gabunia and R. E. Kukhaleishvili argued that dental features such as relatively low tooth crowns and a buccally flat metacone bordered by a cingulum placed the rhodopagids in Lophialetidae.

Hooker and Dashzeveg demonstrated in 1997 that the features mentioned by Gabunia and Kukhaleishvili are not exclusive to lophialetids, as they are also seen in non-lophialetids such as Colodon and Heptodon. Hooker and Dashzeveg concluded, contrary to Hooker's previous assessment, that rhodopagids were rhinocerotoids. Among the features used to demonstrate this, the most important were a distinct break between the metaconule and protoconule, seen in rhinocerotoids but not tapiroids, and that "Rhodopagus" radinskyi does not show any sign of a major narial incision, which typifies nearly all tapiroids (other than Heptodon). Hooker and Dashzeveg's cladogram of internal rhodopagid relationships, and distinguishing characters, is shown below:

- Rhodopagidae (Note: Loss of the first premolar + high and straight continuous buccal crests on the upper and lower third premolars)
  - "Rhodopagus" radinskyi (Note: Very small size)
  - (Note: Complete upper molar lingual cingulum + increased tooth crown height)
    - Veragromovia
    - (Note: Markedly lingually tilted metacone on the upper molars + upper molar metaloph and lower molar hypolophid slightly taller than the protoloph and protolophid, respectively)
      - Rhodopagus (Note: Premolar row shortened relative to the molar row)
      - Pataecops (Note: Upper molar metaloph and lower molar hypolophid much taller than the protoloph and protolophid, respectively + long upper molar postmetacrista)

In 2005, Alexander Averianov and Marc Godinot agreed with Hooker and Dashzeveg's conclusions, noting that a break between the metaloph and the protocone, and the lack of a major narial incision, indicate that rhodopagids should be included in Rhinocerotoidea. Averianov and Godinot noted that rhodopagid teeth do not indicate any obvious special relation to any other rhinocerotoid family, and thus classified Rhodopagidae as Rhinocerotoidea incertae sedis. In 2011, Bolat A. Bayshashov and Emmanuel M. E. Billia also classified rhodopagids as rhinocerotoids.

In 2020, Bin Bai and colleagues classified rhodopagids as early ceratomorphs, though noted that they have been "argued to be rhinocerotoids". In phylogenetic analyses, Bai et al. recovered Rhodopagus (the only rhodopagid genus included in the analyses) as a sister taxon of Dilophodon, closely related to Deperetellidae. Different analyses placed Rhodopagus, Dilophodon, and Deperetellidae in different positions; the most parsimonious tree (MPT) placed them inside Tapiroidea, whereas the Bayesian inference tree (BIT) placed them as close relatives of Rhinocerotoidea.
