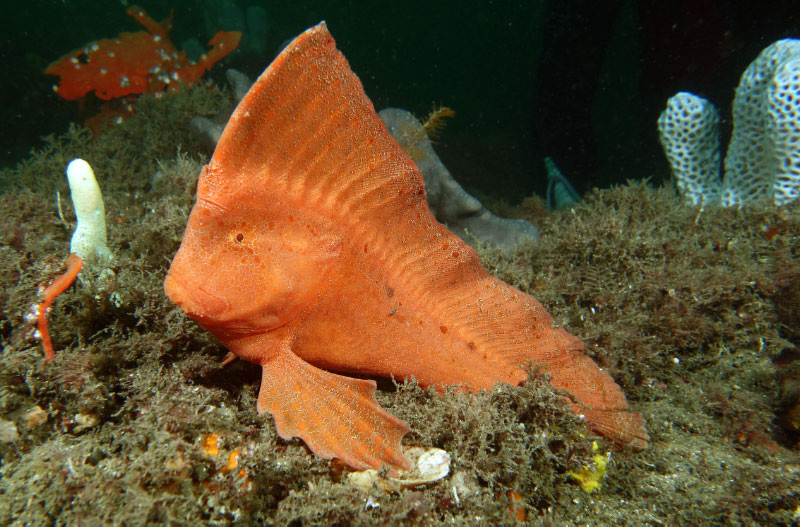
- Red indian fish (Pataecus fronto)

Scientific classification
- Kingdom: Animalia
- Phylum: Chordata
- Class: Actinopterygii
- Order: Perciformes
- Suborder: Scorpaenoidei
- Family: Synanceiidae
- Subfamily: Pataecinae; T. N. Gill, 1872

Genera
- see text

= Australian prowfish =

Family of fishes

The Australian prowfishes, comprising the small subfamily Pataecinae, are ray-finned fishes classified within the family Synanceiidae of the suborder Scorpaenoidei. They are distinguished by a long dorsal fin that begins far forward on the head — forming a "prow"-like shape — and extends all the way to the caudal fin. They lack scales and pelvic fins.

== Taxonomy ==
The Australian prowfishes were first recognised as a family in 1872 by the American biologist Theodore Gill, with the type species of the family being Pataecus fronto, which had been described by John Richardson in 1844. The 5th edition of Fishes of the World classifies the family within the suborder Scorpaenoidei, which in turn is classified within the order Scorpaeniformes. Other authorities place Scorpaenoidei within the order Perciformes. A recent study placed this family into an expanded stonefish clade, Synanceiidae, due to the presence of a lachrymal sabre — a switch-blade-like mechanism that can be projected from underneath their eye — in all these fishes. This classification is followed by Eschmeyer's Catalog of Fishes.

The name of the family comes from the genus Pataecus, which is derived from Pataikos, a strangely shaped dwarf-like Phoenician deity which was used as a figurehead on the prows of ships.

== Genera ==
The Australian prowfishes are classified into three monotypic genera:

- Aetapcus E.O.G. Scott, 1936
- Neopataecus Steindachner, 1884
- Pataecus Richardson, 1844

== Characteristics ==
The Australian prowfishes are unusual scorpeanoids characterized by a compressed triangular body and a long, undivided dorsal fin that originates on the head, in front of the eyes. They lack pelvic fins and scales on their body, although in one species the body is covered in papillae. There are 19–25 spines and 7–17 soft rays in the dorsal fin and 5–11 spines and 3–7 soft rays in the anal fin. The pectoral fin has 8 rays, all of which are unbranched. There is a fleshy extension on the front of the isthmus.

== Distribution and habitat ==
Australian prowfishes are endemic to the coastal waters of southern Australia. Here they are associated with sponge and algal beds on rocky habitats.
