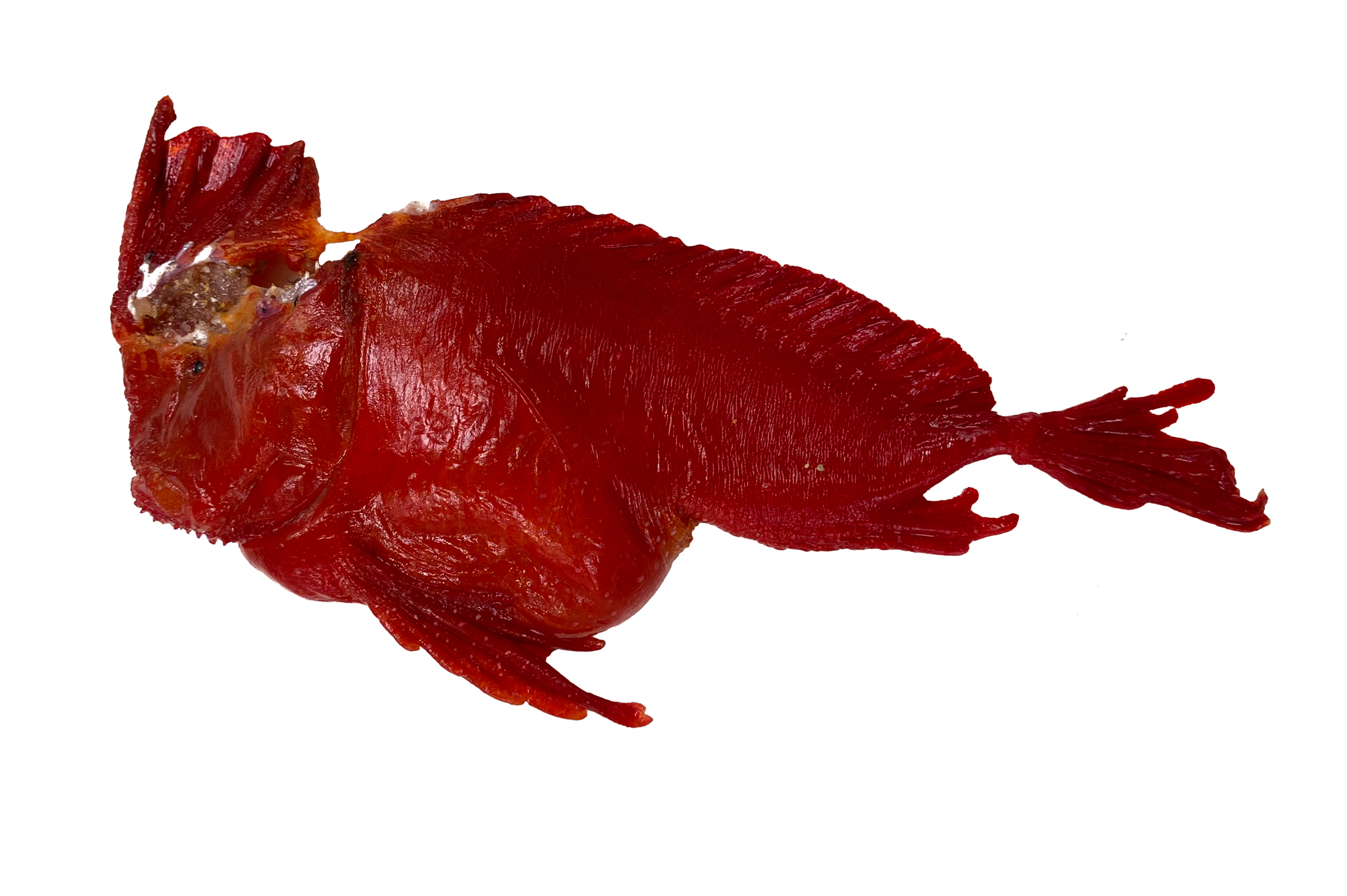
- A whiskered prowfish found washed ashore at Harmers Haven, Victoria, January 2020

Scientific classification
- Kingdom: Animalia
- Phylum: Chordata
- Class: Actinopterygii
- Order: Perciformes
- Family: Synanceiidae
- Subfamily: Pataecinae
- Genus: Neopataecus; Steindachner, 1884
- Species: N. waterhousii

Binomial name
- Neopataecus waterhousii (Castelnau, 1872)

Synonyms
- Pataecus waterhousii Castelnau, 1872

= Whiskered prowfish =

Species of fish

The whiskered prowfish (Neopataecus waterhousii) is a species of marine ray-finned fish, an Australian prowfish belonging to the subfamily Pataecinae. It is endemic to the coastal waters of southern Australia. This species is the only member of the monotypic genus Neopataecus.

== Taxonomy ==
The whiskered prowfish was first formally described in 1872 asPataecus waterhousii by the French naturalist Francis de Laporte de Castelnau with the type locality given as the St Vincent Gulf in South Australia. In 1884 Franz Steindachner described a new subgenus of Aetapcus, Neopataecus, for this species and this is now considered to be a valid genus. The 5th edition of Fishes of the World classifies the family Pataecidae, in which this genus is classified, within the suborder Scorpaenoidei which in turn is classified within the order Scorpaeniformes. Other authorities place the Scorpaenoidei within the Perciformes. A recent study placed the Australian prowfishes into an expanded stonefish clade, Synanceiidae, because all of these fish have a lachrymal sabre that can project a switch-blade-like mechanism out from underneath their eye. The name of the genus prefixes Pataecus with neo, meaning "new". The specific name honours Frederick George Waterhouse, curator at the South Australia Museum, the collector of the holotype.

== Description ==
The whiskered prowfish has an elongated, highly compressed body which tapers towards the tail and ends in a slender, elongated caudal peduncle. The head is large and the dorsal profile slopes at a slightly obtuse angle and the smallish eyes are set high on the head. The mouth is oblique with a band of tiny teeth on each jaw. There are no scales but there are a few warty projections on the body. There are small, thin fringe like growths on the underside of the head. There are 19-23 spines and 7-10 soft rays in the dorsal fin, which is continuous and tall with its origin in front of the eyes, joined by a membrane to the caudal peduncle but not the caudal fin. The anal fin is also long with its rays becoming longer towards the rear has 5-7 spines and 3-5 soft rays. The caudal fin has 9 rays and the pectoral fin has 8 rays, all of the rays in the fins are unbranched. The caudal fin is elongate in shape with the upper rays being shorter than the lower. The large pectoral fins are situated low on the body and extend past the anus and have clear incisions on their rear edges. The maximum total length of this species is 22 cm (8.7 in). The colour of this fash may be orange or brown marked with pink or white blotches or red lines.

== Distribution and habitat ==
The whiskered prowfish is endemic to southern Australia where it is found from the Houtman Abrolhos in Western Australia east to Inverloch, Victoria and King Island, Tasmania. It occurs as deep as 40 m (130 ft), living in sheltered reefs among sponges, seaweeds and seagrasses, it has infrequently been observed in floating algae.

== Biology ==
The whiskered prowfish's biology is little known, they are slow moving and shed their skin at regular intervals, probably to remove encrusting organisms.
