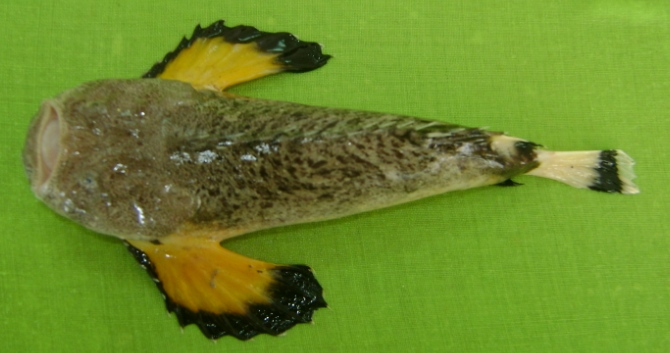

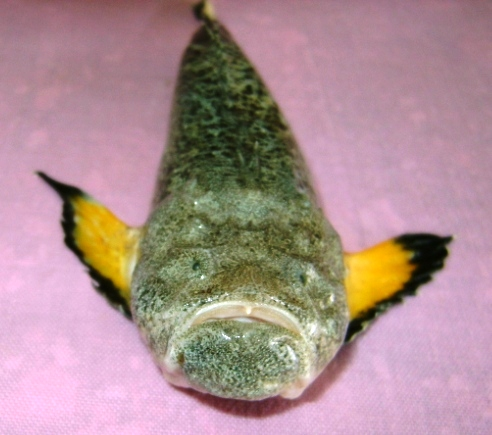

Conservation status
- Least Concern (IUCN 3.1)

Scientific classification
- Kingdom: Animalia
- Phylum: Chordata
- Class: Actinopterygii
- Order: Perciformes
- Family: Synanceiidae
- Subfamily: Synanceiinae
- Genus: Pseudosynanceia; F. Day, 1875
- Species: P. melanostigma

Binomial name
- Pseudosynanceia melanostigma F. Day, 1875

= Blackfin stonefish =

Genus of fishes

The blackfin stonefish (Pseudosynanceia melanostigma) is a species of venomous ray-finned fish, a stonefish be longing to the subfamily Synanceiinae of the family Scorpaenidae, the scorpionfishes and their relatives. It is the only species in the monotypic genus. It is native to the western Indian Ocean where it occurs in areas with muddy bottoms. This species grows to a total length of 13 centimetres (5.1 in).

== Taxonomy ==
The blackfin stonefish was first formally described in 1875 by the British zoologist Francis Day with the type locality given as Kurachi in Sind, modern Karachi in Pakistan. At the same time Day described a new monotypic genus, Pseudosynanceia, for this new species. The genus Pseudosynanceia is classified within the tribe Synanceiini which is one of three tribes in the subfamily Synanceeinae within the family Scorpaenidae. However, other authorities regard Synanceiidae as a valid family and the Synanceiini as the subfamily Synanceiinae. The genus name combines pseudo meaning "false" with Synanceia, this species being considered by Day to be similar to Leptosynanceia, except for its vomerine teeth. The specific name melanostigma means "black-spotted", presumed to be an allusion to the black spots on the body and fins.

== Description ==
The blackfin stonefish has 15 to 17 spines and 4 to 6 soft rays in its dorsal fin, typical counts being 16 spines and 4 soft rays. There are 3 spines and 7 or 8 soft spines in the anal fin, 14-15 fin rays in the pectoral fin and a single spine and 5 soft rays in the pelvic fins. All the fin rays are simple and are not branched. The head is depressed with an upwards pointing mouth and upward pointing eyes on the head's dorsal surface. There are no deep pis on the head. The body is greyish brown mottled with pale. The dorsal fin is dark while the caudal fin is pale with a black submarginal band. The anal, pelvic and pectoral fins have yellow bases and wide black distal bands. This species reaches a maximum total length of 13 cm (5.1 in).

== Distribution and habitat ==
The blackfin stonefish is found in the northwestern Indian Ocean but its actual distribution is not well known. It is found in the Persian Gulf, Pakistan and western India. It is a benthic fish found on muddy beds in marine and estuarine environments.

== Venom ==
The blackfin stonefish has venom glands in its fin spines and the venom can cause severe pain and even be fatal to envenomated people.
