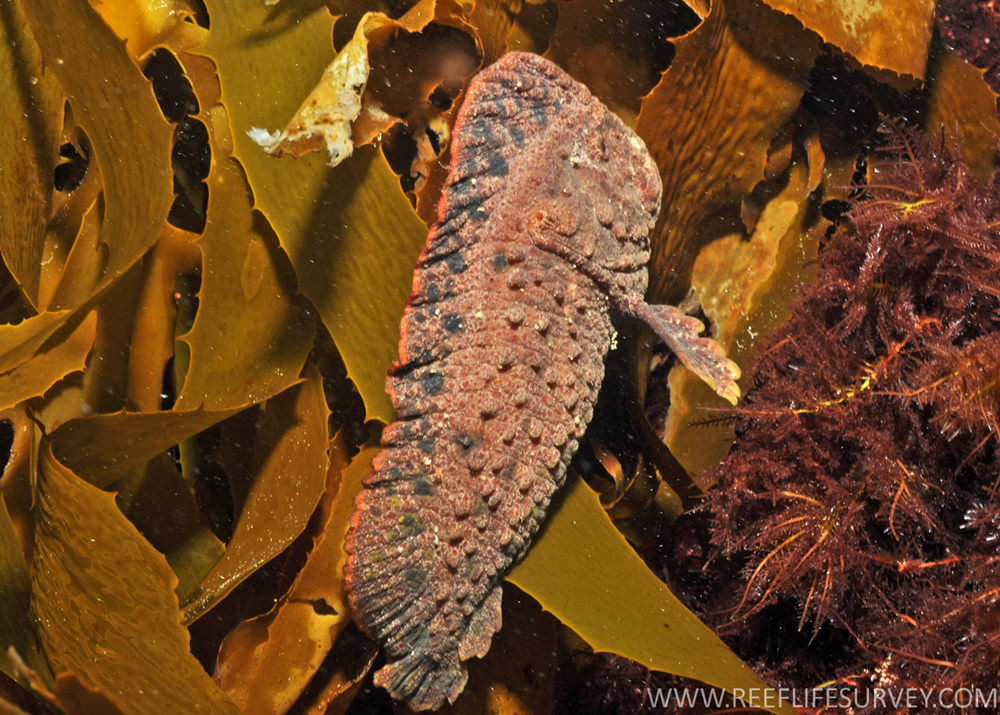

Scientific classification
- Kingdom: Animalia
- Phylum: Chordata
- Class: Actinopterygii
- Division: Teleostei
- Order: Perciformes
- Family: Synanceiidae
- Subfamily: Pataecinae
- Genus: Aetapcus; E. O. G. Scott, 1936
- Species: A. maculatus

Binomial name
- Aetapcus maculatus (Günther, 1861)

Synonyms
- Pataecus maculatus Günther, 1861; Pataecus vincentii Steindachner, 1861

= Warty prowfish =

Species of fish

The warty prowfish (Aetapcus maculatus), also known as the smooth prowfish or Tasmanian prowfish, is a species of marine ray-finned fish, an Australian prowfish belonging to the subfamily Pataecinae, It is endemic to the coastal waters of southern Australia where it inhabits mostly rocky reefs. This species is the only member of the monotypic genus Aetapcus.

== Taxonomy ==
The warty prowfish was first formally described in 1861 as Pataecus maculatus by the German-born British ichthyologist Albert Günther with the type locality given as Fremantle in Western Australia. In 1936 the Australian teacher and ichthyologist Eric Oswald Gale Scott classified this species within the monotypic genus Aetapcus. The 5th edition of Fishes of the World classifies the family Pataecidae within the suborder Scorpaenoidei which in turn is classified within the order Scorpaeniformes. Other authorities place the Scorpaenoidei within the Perciformes. A recent study placed the Australian prowfishes into an expanded stonefish clade, Synanceiidae, because all of these fish have a lachrymal sabre that can project a switch-blade-like mechanism out from underneath their eye. The name of the genus is an anagram of Pataecus, Scott originally considered this genus to be a subgenus of Pataecus.

== Description ==
The warty prowfish has a compressed, unusually wedge-shaped, elongate body with the skin of adults covered in bumps resembling warts, juveniles have smooth skins. The dorsal fin has its origin in front of the eyes, has between 18 and 22 spines and 12 to 13 soft rays, which are even in height, and is connected to the caudal fin by a membrane and they do not have pelvic fins. The anal fin has between 4 and 9 spines and 3 to 5 soft rays. There are 8 rays in the pectoral fin and 9 in the caudal fin. They have a large head with a near vertical dorsal profile of the snout. The colour is very variable, they are frequently dusky yellow, or greyish to olive-brown, or even orange to red, marked with darker blotches and spots. The spots on the head and body are small while the spots on the dorsal and caudal fins are frequently large, the largest spots are close to the bases of the fins. The maximum published total length of this species is 22 cm (8.7 in).

== Distribution and habitat ==
The warty prowfish is endemic to the waters of southern Australia where it is found from Shark Bay, Western Australia, to Wilsons Promontory, Victoria, and south to Maria Island, Tasmania. This species is found in sheltered coastal waters on reefs, in bays and harbours at depths between 1 and 45 m (3 ft 3 in and 147 ft 8 in). They are frequently found in association with sponges, although they will also use seagrass and seaweed beds to shelter in.

== Biology ==
The warty prowfish is an ambush predator, sitting camouflaged in its habitat and ambushing prey, mainly crustaceans. This species sheds its skin on a regular basis, this was first observed in specimens kept in an aquarium. Shedding occurs every three week or so and it is thought that in these highly sedentary fish a film of organisms colonises the skin and the fish sheds the skin to rid itself of this film. When disturbed these fishes may emit a cloud of distasteful liquid as a protective measure.
