= Herbert Hedley Scott =

Australian museum curator

Herbert Hedley Scott (1866–1938) was curator and director of the Queen Victoria Museum and Art Gallery in Tasmania. Born in England, Scott became interested in natural history while living with his family in New York and Pennsylvania. He moved to New Zealand for a brief period in 1887 before arriving in Launceston in Tasmania, where he resided until his death. It was there he met and married Francis Fannie née Stearnes. The museum that Scott began sole administration was only curated on a part-time basis by his predecessor, Alexander Morton, and he went on to introduce improvements such as new galleries and activities. The microscopical club he previously began eventually became directed toward research on natural history, a department he separated from the geological displays of his museum. He also created a display of vertebrates in 1909. Scott's publications included brochures on paleontology and in the proceedings of the Royal Society of Tasmania. He is noted for research on fossil species of Nototherium, along with other extinct mammals and birds. In 1934 he was awarded the Royal Society of Tasmania Medal. He died on 1 March 1938 at Launceston, being survived by Frances Fannie née Stearnes, who had married in 1893, and their daughter and son, Eric Oswald Gale Scott, who succeeded him as director of the QVMAG.
