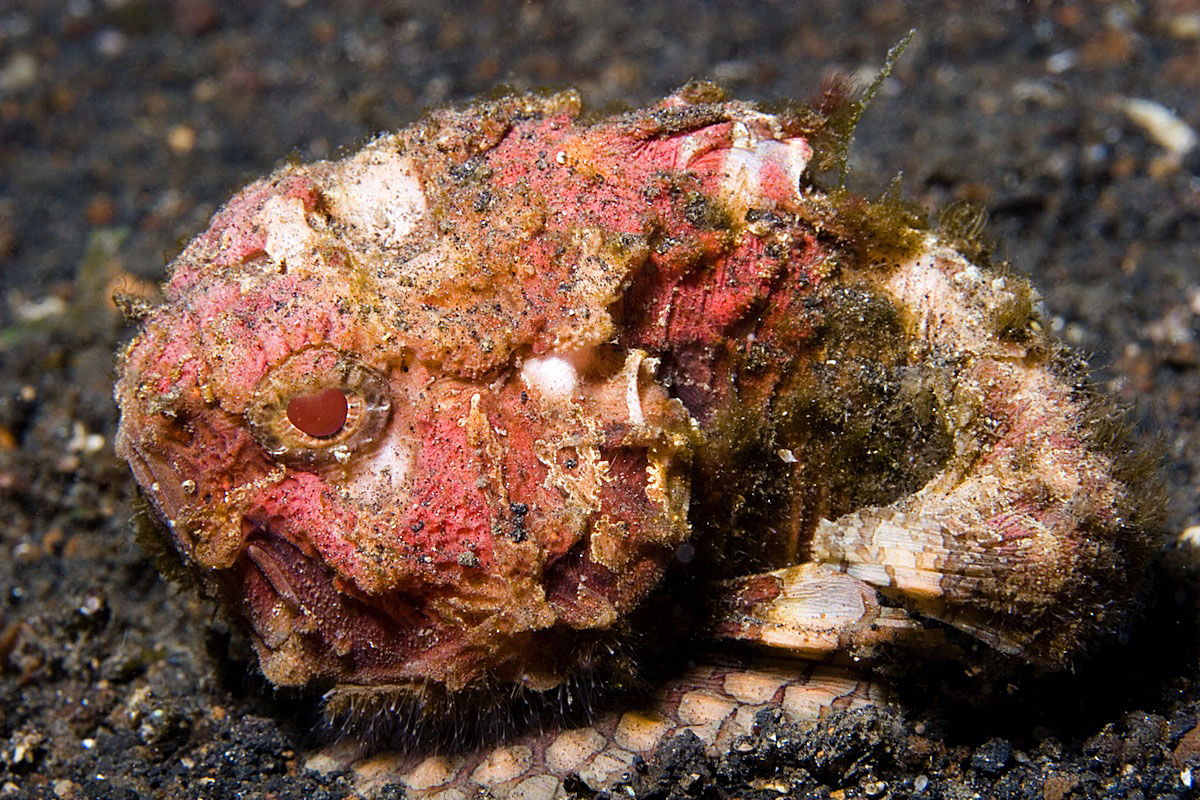
- Pitted stonefish (Erosa erosa), at Lembeh Strait, Manado, Indonesia

Conservation status
- Least Concern (IUCN 3.1)

Scientific classification
- Kingdom: Animalia
- Phylum: Chordata
- Class: Actinopterygii
- Order: Perciformes
- Family: Synanceiidae
- Subfamily: Synanceiinae
- Genus: Erosa; Swainson, 1839
- Species: E. erosa

Binomial name
- Erosa erosa (Cuvier, 1829)

Synonyms
- Synanceia erosa Cuvier, 1829

= Pitted stonefish =

Species of fishes

The pitted stonefish (Erosa erosa), also known as the Pacific monkey-fish, is a species of venomous ray-finned fish, a stonefish be longing to the subfamily Synanceiinae of the family Scorpaenidae, the scorpionfishes and their relatives. It is the only species in the monotypic genus Erosa and is found in the eastern Indian Ocean and the western Pacific Ocean.

== Taxonomy ==
The pitted stonefish was first formally described as Synanceia erosa in 1829 by the French zoologist Georges Cuvier with the type locality given as "Seas of Japan". In 1839 William Swainson placed it in the monotypic genus Erosa. The genus is considered, by some, to include the daruma stinger (Dampierosa daruma). The genus Erosa is classified within the tribe Synanceiini which is one of three tribes in the subfamily Synanceeinae within the family Scorpaenidae. However, other authorities regard Synanceiidae as a valid family and the Synanceiini as the subfamily Synanceiinae. Erosa means "gnawed" or "eaten away", an allusion to the dimpled surfaces of the bones.

== Description ==
The pitted stonefish has a large head which has a rounded profile, there is a bony hump above the eyes with a deep pit on the nape. The snout is very short giving the head a nearly vertical anterior profile. This species has 14 spines and 9 soft rays in the dorsal fin and 2 spines and 5 or 6 soft rays in the anal fin. The overall colour is varies from reddish to orange or brown mottled with white. There mat be dark crossbands and lines of irregular shaped white spots on the pectoral, pelvic, anal and caudal fins. This species reaches a maximum total length of 15 cm (5.9 in).

== Distribution and habitat ==
The pitted stonefish is found in the Indo-Pacific from southern Japan south to Australia and has been recorded from Korea, China, Taiwan, the Philippines, Indonesia, New Caledonia and Tonga. In Australia it is found from Exmouth Gulf in Western Australia to Moreton Bay in Queensland. This benthic species is found down to 90 m (300 ft) in depth, although it is commoner at deeper depths, on sand and mud substrates.

== Biology ==
The pitted stonefish has venomous spines in its fins.
