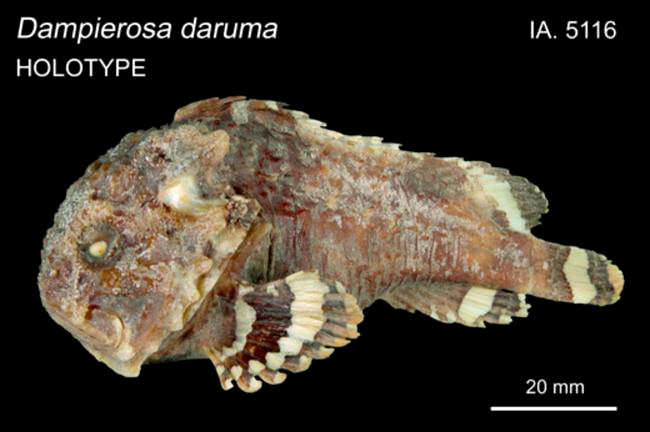
- Holotype of Dampierosa daruma

Conservation status
- Least Concern (IUCN 3.1)

Scientific classification
- Kingdom: Animalia
- Phylum: Chordata
- Class: Actinopterygii
- Order: Perciformes
- Family: Synanceiidae
- Subfamily: Synanceiinae
- Genus: Dampierosa; Whitley, 1932
- Species: D. daruma

Binomial name
- Dampierosa daruma Whitley, 1932

Synonyms
- Erosa daruma (Whitley, 1932)

= Daruma stinger =

Species of venomous ray-finned fish

The daruma stinger (Dampierosa daruma), also known as the North-western stonefish, is a species of venomous ray-finned fish, a stonefish belonging to the subfamily Synanceiinae of the family Scorpaenidae, the scorpionfishes and their relatives. It is the only species in the monotypic genus Dampierosa and is endemic to Australia.

== Taxonomy ==
The daruma stinger was first formally described in 1932 by the Australian ichthyologist Gilbert Percy Whitley with the type locality given as off Broome in Western Australia. Whitley described it as the only species in the monotypic genus Dampierosa but it has also been considered to be a member of the genus Erosa together with the pitted stonefish (E. erosa). The genus Dampierosa is classified within the tribe Synanceiini which is one of three tribes in the subfamily Synanceeinae within the family Scorpaenidae. However, other authorities regard Synanceiidae as a valid family and the Synanceiini as the subfamily Synanceiinae. The genus name is presumed to be a combination of Dampier, the Dampier Peninsula which lies north of Broome and Erosa, the genus it is closely related to. The specific name daruma was not explains but it is likely to be Japanese and to be an allusion to the bulbous head of this species, daruma being applied to squat Buddha figures and to some large-headed fishes.

== Description ==
The daruma stinger has a large smoothly rounded head, with no hump over the eyes and no occipital pit. The pectoral and caudal fins are banded with dark bases, wide white bands in the middle, a dark sub-marginal band and a pale margin. This species has a maximum total length of 13 cm (5.1 in). They have venomous spines in the fins.

== Distribution and habitat ==
The daruma stinger is found off northwestern Australia, it is a benthic species found on inshore reefs in shallow waters down to 2 m (6 ft 7 in) depth.
