= Rhodopagus =

Rhodopagus Temporal range: Early–Late Eocene (Arshantan–Sharamurunian), 52.1–39.9 Ma
- Illustration of the type jaw fragment (AMNH 20310) of R. minimus

Scientific classification
- Kingdom: Animalia
- Phylum: Chordata
- Class: Mammalia
- Order: Perissodactyla
- Family: †Rhodopagidae
- Genus: †Rhodopagus; Radinsky, 1965

Type species
- †Rhodopagus pygmaeus Radinsky, 1965

Other species
- †R. guoi Paepen et al., 2021; †R. minimus (Matthew & Granger, 1925); Species pending reassessment: †R. radinskyi Gabunia & Kukhaleishvili, 1991

Synonyms
- Synonyms of R. minimus: Caenolophus minimus Granger & Gregory, 1925

Extinct genus of mammals

Rhodopagus is an extinct genus of rhodopagid that lived in East Asia during the Early to Late Eocene, in the Arshantan, Irdinmanhan, and Sharamurunian land mammal ages. Rhodopagus was a small and primitive ceratomorph. Numerous species of Rhodopagus have been described historically, though only three are currently recognized, R. pygmaeus, R. minimus, and R. guoi, all three known from China. The name Rhodopagus means "red hill", a translation of the Mongolian "Ulan Shireh", after the Ulan Shireh Formation.

== Research history ==
Fossils of Rhodopagus show that it was a very small perissodactyl. Rhodopagus minimus was the first species now considered to belong to Rhodopagus to be described. R. minimus was originally described as a species provisionally referred to the genus Caenolophus (as C. minimus) by William Diller Matthew and Walter W. Granger in 1925. The new species was based on a jaw fragment (AMNH 20310), which preserves the first and second molars, found in the Shara Murun Formation of Inner Mongolia, China. Matthew and Granger offered only a brief description of the species, noting that the molars had the "same characters" as other species referred to Caenolophus, but were decidedly smaller in size.

In 1965, Leonard Radinsky described the new genus and species Rhodopagus pygmaeus, based on a partial maxilla (AMNH 21554), preserving the third premolar to third molar, found in the Ulan Shireh Formation in Inner Mongolia. Radinsky also referred additional fossils to R. pygmaeus, all from the Ulan Shireh Formation, including several sets of lower dentitions (AMNH 20330–20350, 20390–20394, 26112, 26114), an isolated second molar (AMNH 81859), and an isolated third molar (AMNH 81860). Radinsky identified Rhodopagus as a tapiroid, and noted that it had a highly unique cusp pattern in its upper dentition, with oblique and inverted U- to V-shaped shearing lophs, and metacones parellal to, or confluent with, the metalophs. Per Radinsky, the cusp pattern set Rhodopagus apart from all other known tapiroids. The generic name Rhodopagus was derived from the Greek rhodon ("red") and pagos ("hill"), a translation of the Mongolian "Ulan Shireh". The species name pygmaeus was derived from the Greek pygmaios ("dwarf"), referencing its small size.

Radinsky referred Matthew and Granger's C. minimus to Rhodopagus (as R. minimus), noting that it closely resembled R. pygmaeus in both size and dental morphology, and differed only in having relatively wider molars. Radinsky also tentatively assigned some fragmentary fossils described by Otto Zdansky in 1930 to Rhodopagus sp., including a small lower jaw from near Xintai, Shandong, and an isolated lower molar from near Mianchi, Henan. Radinsky further referred AMNH 81842, an isolated premolar and unassociated isolated lower molar found in the Irdin Manha Formation, Inner Mongolia, to Rhodopagus, possibly R. pygmaeus, on account of a similar cusp pattern.

In 1978, Zheng Jia-Jian and colleagues reported fossils of Rhodopagus sp. in the Lunan Basin of Yunnan in southern China, but did not describe or illustrate any of these fossils. Fossils of both R. pygmaeus and R. minimus have also since been reported from the Lumeiyi Formation in Yunnan.

Spencer G. Lucas and Robert M. Schoch reassessed Rhodopagus in 1981, and designated R. pygmaeus as a synonym of R. minimus (and R. minimus as the new type species), noting that the wide molars of R. minimus appeared to fall within the range of the fossils referred to R. pygmaeus by Radinsky. In 2020, Bin Bai and colleagues recognized R. minimus and R. pygmaeus as separate species, pending the discovery of more complete fossil material.

In 2021, Marieke Paepen, Hong Li, Yan Sun, and Thierry Smith described the new species R. guoi, based on a large number of jaw and tooth fossils found at Bayan Ulan in the Arshanto Formation in Inner Mongolia. The right dentary IMM-1995-BAYU-016 was selected as the type specimen of the new species, which was named in memory of Dian-Yong Guo, a paleontologist part of the expedition team which found the fossils. Paepen et al. distinguished R. guoi from the other species by that the distinct cristid obliqua of lower premolars and molars contact the protolophid lingual to the protoconid, and that R. guoi does not have swollen root tips, seen in the teeth of R. minimus.

=== Other proposed and reassigned species ===
- R. minutissimus was described by Valeriy Yurievich Reshetov in 1979, based on fossils from Kyrgyzstan. R. minutissimus was reclassified as a species of Pataecops by Alexander Averianov and Marc Godinot in 2005.
- R. zdanskyi was described by Lucas and Schoch in 1981, based on one of Zdansky's fossils assigned to Rhodopagus sp. by Radinsky, the lower jaw from Xintai (PMU. M. 3004). Lucas and Schoch differentiated R. zdanskyi from R. minimus by its smaller size, and by various dental features. Transferred to the genus Yimengia (as Y. zdanskyi) by Wang Jingwen in 1988.
- R. laiwuensis was described by Qi Tao och Meng Zhenya in 1983, based on fossils from Shandong. Transferred to the genus Yimengia (as Y. laiwuensis) by Wang Jingwen in 1988.
- R. radinskyi was described by Leo Gabunia and R. E. Kukhaleishvili in 1991, based on fossils which include a nearly complete skull. In 1997, Jerry J. Hooker and Demberelyin Dashzeveg showed that R. radinskyi lacks several dental features seen in Rhodopagus and the closely related Pataecops, and concluded that R. radinskyi should most appropriately be assigned to a new genus of rhodopagid.
- R. yunnanensis was described by Zong Guanfu and colleagues in 1996, based on two partial left maxillae and some isolated teeth found in the Lijiang Formation in Yunnan. In 2023, Bin Bai reassessed the R. yunnanensis fossils, and designated it as a synonym of the palaeothere Lijiangia zhangae, also known from the Lijiang Formation.

== Classification ==
In 1965, Radinsky provisionally classified Rhodopagus in the tapiroid family Lophialetidae. Radinsky noted that the lower dentition of R. pygmaeus was very similar to that of the North American helaletid Dilophodon leotanus, so much so that R. pygmaeus could have been referred to Dilophodon if only the lower teeth had been known. Because of the striking differences between the upper dentition of R. pygmaeus and D. leotanus, and any other helaletid, Radinsky concluded that the similarities in the lower teeth were due to convergent evolution. Radinsky considered it possible that Rhodopagus had evolved from a primitive lophialetid, a family with which it shares long ectolophs, but noted that no intermediate forms are known, and that the small size and functionally bilophodont dentition of Rhodopagus does not fit with the evolutionary trends otherwise seen in Lophialetidae. In 1975, Reshetov distinguished Rhodopagus and Pataecops within Lophialetidae as the subfamily Rhodopaginae.

In 1981, Lucas and Schoch argued through cladistic analysis that Rhodopagus was not a tapiroid, but actually belonged to the rhinocerotoid family Hyracodontidae. Lucas and Schoch's conception of Hyracodontidae included genera such as Triplopus and Forstercooperia, and thus reflects a now outdated definition of the family since such genera are generally recovered outside of the family in modern phylogenetic analyses. Lucas and Schoch noted particularly strong dental similarities to Triplopus, and argued that the upper dentition of Rhodopagus placed it as a hyracodont, though it had a lower dentition that had convergently evolved to resemble that of the helaletids.

Rhodopaginae was raised to the status of a distinct family (Rhodopagidae) by Hooker in 1989, who placed it as a sister group of Deperetellidae, both classified as primitive ceratomorph groups not part of either Tapiroidea or Rhinocerotoidea. In the 1991 description of "R." radinskyi, Gabunia and Kukhaleishvili argued that dental features such as relatively low tooth crowns and a buccally flat metacone bordered by a cingulum placed the rhodopagids in Lophialetidae. Hooker and Dashzeveg demonstrated in 1997 that these features are not exclusive to lophialetids, as they are also seen in non-lophialetids such as Colodon and Heptodon. Hooker and Dashzeveg concluded, contrary to Hooker's previous assessment, that rhodopagids were rhinocerotoids. Among the features used to demonstrate this, the most important were a distinct break between the metaconule and protoconule, seen in rhinocerotoids but not tapiroids, and that "Rhodopagus" radinskyi does not show any sign of a major narial incision which typifies nearly all tapiroids (other than Heptodon). In 2005, Averianov and Godinot agreed with Hooker and Dashzeveg's conclusions, and classified Rhodopagidae in Rhinocerotoidea. Phylogenetic analyses by Bin Bai and colleagues in 2020 recovered rhodopagids as relatively basal ceratomorphs, either inside Tapiroidea or as close relatives of Rhinocerotoidea, depending on the method used.
