= Queen Victoria Museum & Art Gallery =

Museum and art gallery in Launceston, Tasmania

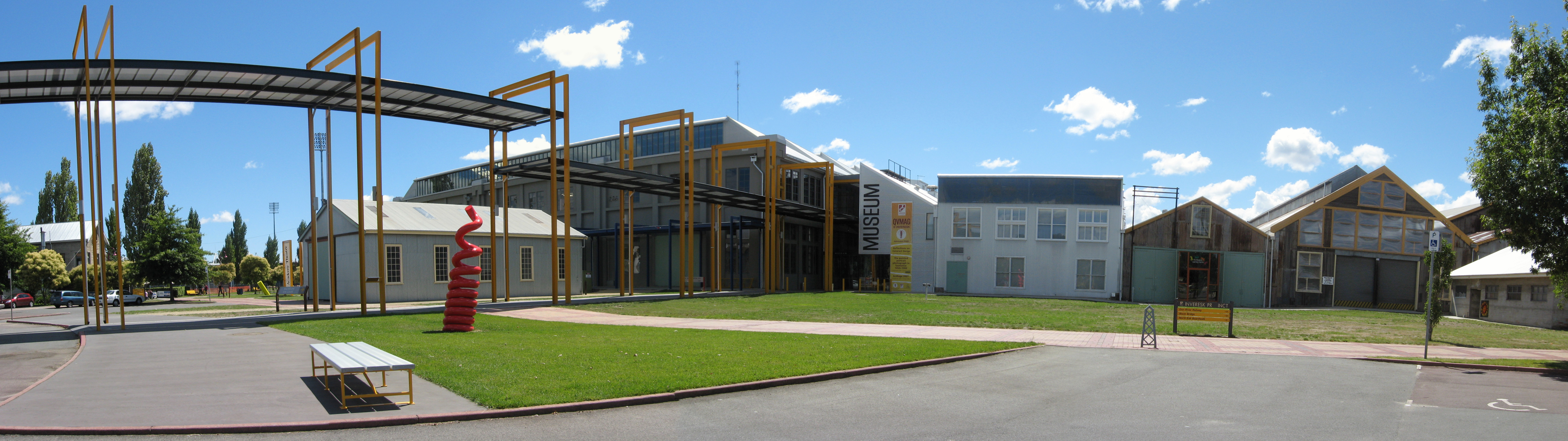
- Inveresk site of the QVMAG

- Location of the QVMAG in Tasmania
- Established: 1891
- Location: Launceston, Tasmania, Australia
- Coordinates: 41°26′16″S 147°08′02″E
- Key holdings: Victoria Cross awarded to Lewis McGee
- Website: Museum website

The Queen Victoria Museum & Art Gallery (QVMAG) is a museum located in Launceston, Tasmania, Australia. It is the largest museum in Australia not located in a capital city.

== History ==
The foundation stone for the original building to house the Queen Victoria Museum & Art Gallery was laid by the Mayor of Launceston, Robert Carter, on 21 June 1887. Alexander Morton, of the museum in Hobart, acted as honorary curator from its opening in 1891 until 1896, with Herbert Hedley Scott assuming the role of curator in May 1897. In 1926 the Launceston City Council amended the name to Queen Victoria Museum and Art Gallery to avoid confusion with the state of Victoria. Scott died in 1938 and was succeeded as director by his son, Eric Oswald Gale Scott later that year.

== Collection and locations ==
Established in 1891, the Queen Victoria Museum & Art Gallery has a strong reputation for its collection which includes fine exhibitions of colonial art, contemporary craft and design, Tasmanian history and natural sciences, specifically a zoology collection. There is also a special exhibition of a full Chinese temple that was used by 19th-century Chinese tin miners, a working planetarium, and displays related to Launceston's industrial environment and railway workshops.

The museum also houses the Victoria Cross awarded to Lewis McGee.

The Queen Victoria Museum & Art Gallery is located on two sites, at Royal Park and at Inveresk, the site of the old Launceston Railway Workshops (41.4280°S 147.1407°E).

== Publications ==
As part of its work, the QVMAG has published several journals relating to Tasmanian ecology and history. These include Records of the Queen Victoria Museum and Art Gallery, Occasional Papers of the Queen Victoria Museum and Art Gallery, Technical Reports of the Queen Victoria Museum and Art Gallery.

== Gallery ==
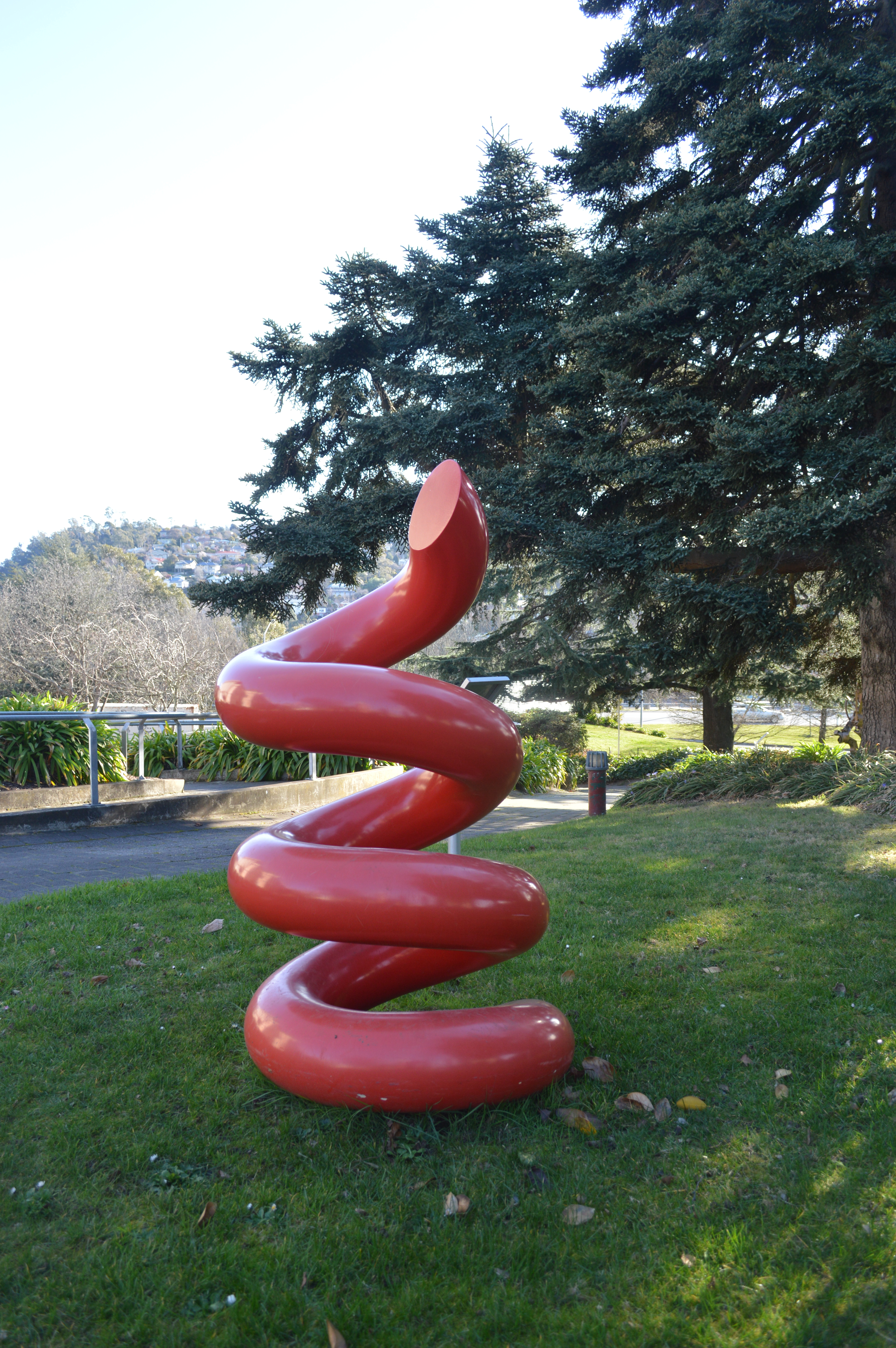
Earth Drill

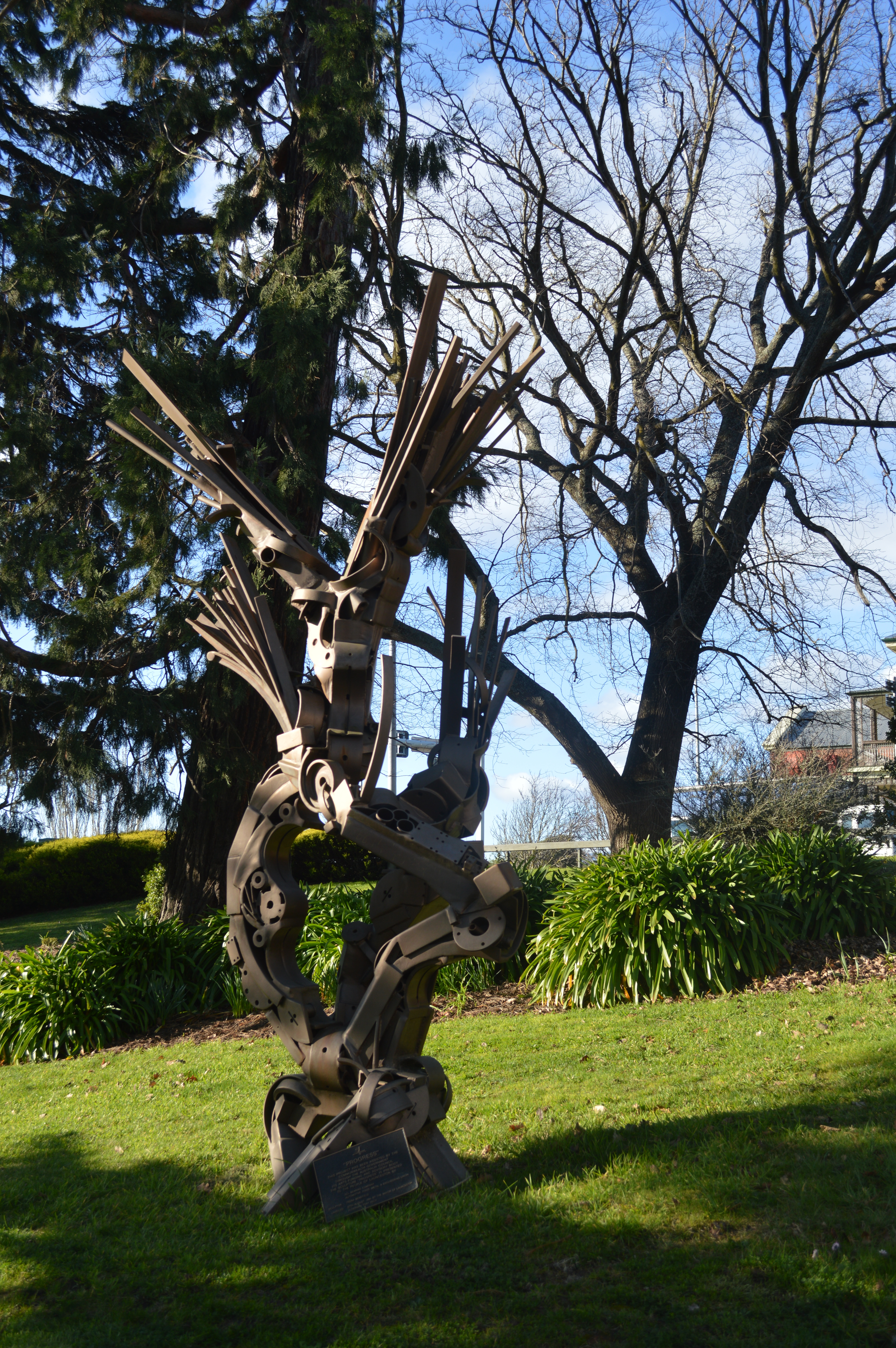
Progress

== See also ==
- List of art museums and galleries in Australia
