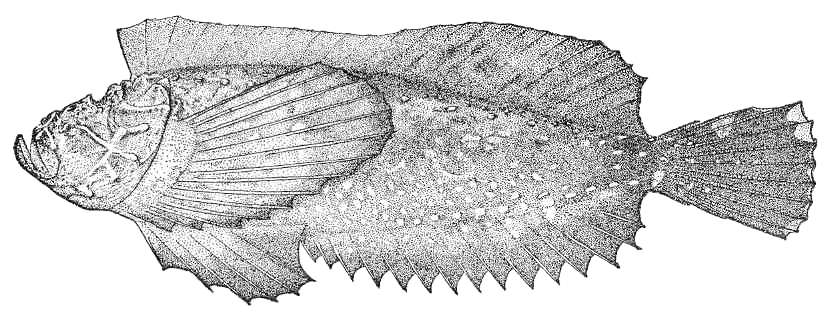

Conservation status
- Least Concern (IUCN 3.1)

Scientific classification
- Kingdom: Animalia
- Phylum: Chordata
- Class: Actinopterygii
- Order: Perciformes
- Family: Synanceiidae
- Subfamily: Synanceiinae
- Genus: Trachicephalus; Swainson, 1839
- Species: T. uranoscopus

Binomial name
- Trachicephalus uranoscopus (Bloch & J. G. Schneider, 1801)

Synonyms
- Synanceia uranoscopa Bloch & Schneider, 1801; Polycaulus uranoscopus (Bloch & Schneider, 1801)

= Stargazing stonefish =

Genus of fishes

The stargazing stonefish (Trachicephalus uranoscopus) is a species of stonefish native to the Indian Ocean and the western Pacific Ocean where it is found on muddy bottoms in estuaries. This venomous species is also a minor component of local commercial fisheries. This species grows to a length of 8 centimetres (3.1 in) SL. This species is the only known member of the genus Trachicephalus.

== Taxonomy ==
The stargazing stonefish was first formally described in 1801 as Synanceia uranoscopa by the German naturalists Marcus Elieser Bloch and Johann Gottlob Theaenus Schneider with the type locality given as Tranquebar in India. In 1839 William Swainson placed S. uranscopa in the new monotypic genus Trachicephalus. The genus Trachicephalus is classified within the tribe Synanceiini which is one of three tribes in the subfamily Synanceeinae within the family Scorpaenidae. However, other authorities regard Synanceiidae as a valid family and the Synanceiini as the subfamily Synanceiinae. The genus name combines Trachinus, the weeverfish genus with cephalus, which means "head", a reference to the species similarity to those fishes. The specific name uranscopus means "skywatcher", a reference to the upward directed eyes of this fish.

== Description ==
The stargazing stonefish has an elongate body with an upturned, almost vertical mouth. The upwards directed eyes are on the dorsal surface of the depressed head which has no deep pits. There are weakly developed spines on the head with 2 or 3 short spines on the lacrimal boneand there are 4 blunt spines on the preoperculum. The dorsal fin has 11-13 spines and 12-14 soft rays while the anal fin has 2 spines and 12-15 soft rays. The pectoral fin has 14-15 fin rays with the lower rays not being separated from the upper rays. All of the soft fin rays are simple, i.e. not branched.There are teeth on the jaws and the vomer, but no teeth on the palatines. There is and indistinct lateral line, which sits high on the body. The head, body and fins are greyish to blackish in colour, marked with ill-defined whitish spots or blotches scattered on the sides and the pectoral and caudal fins, as well as on the base of the anal fin. The outer margins of the soft-rayed parts of the dorsal and anal fins are yellowish white and the rear margin of the caudal fin is white. The maximum recorded total length of this species is 10 cm (3.9 in).

== Distribution and habitat ==
The stargazing stonefish has a distribution which extends from India eastward through the Strait of Malacca, then northward along the eastern coasts of Malaysia and Thailand to Hong Kong and southern China. It has also been reported to extend east into Indonesia and eastern Australia. This demersal species is found in shallow waters at depths between 2 and 25 m (6 ft 7 in and 82 ft 0 in) on muddy and sandy substrates in estuarine and coastal waters.

== Utilisation ==
The stargazing stonefish is sold locally in fish markets, despite its venomous spines.
