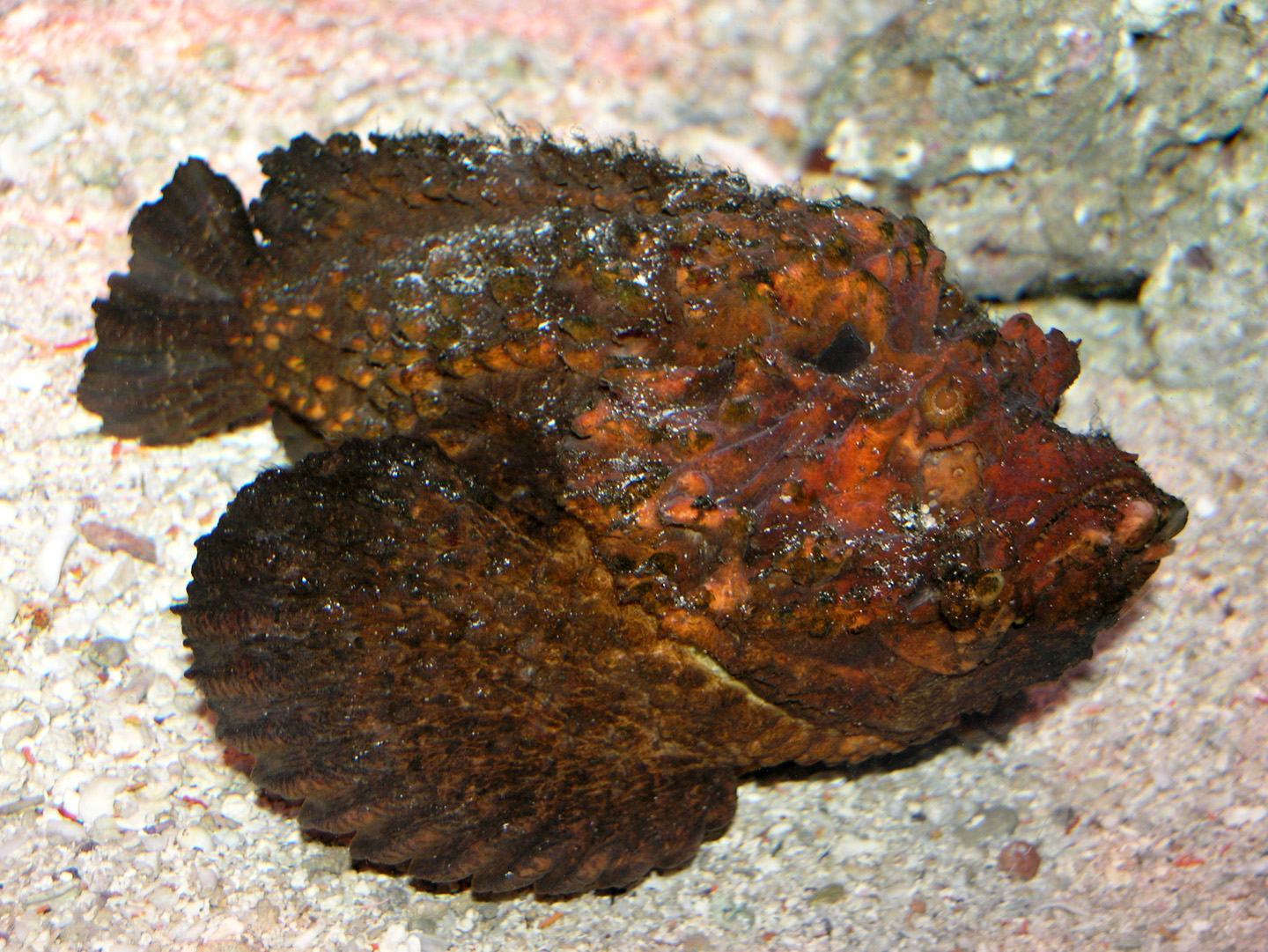
- Stonefish, Synanceia verrucosa

Scientific classification
- Kingdom: Animalia
- Phylum: Chordata
- Class: Actinopterygii
- Division: Teleostei
- Order: Perciformes
- Family: Synanceiidae
- Subfamily: Synanceiinae; Swainson, 1839

Type species
- Scorpaena brachion Linnaeus, 1758

Tribes
- See text

= Synanceiinae =

Family of fishes

Synanceiinae is a subfamily of venomous ray-finned fishes, the stonefishes, which are classified as part of the family Synanceiidae within the suborder Scorpaenoidei. These fishes are found in the Indo-Pacific oceans. They are primarily marine, though some species are known to live in fresh or brackish waters. The various species of this family are known informally as stonefish, stinger, stingfish and ghouls. Its species are known to have the most potent neurotoxins of all the fish venoms, secreted from glands at the base of their needle-like dorsal fin spines. The vernacular name, stonefish, for some of these fishes derives from their behaviour of camouflaging as rocks. The type species of the family is the reef stonefish (Synanceia verrucosa).

== Taxonomy ==
Synanceiinae was first named and recognised as a grouping of related taxa by the English naturalist William Swainson in 1839. The 5th edition of Fishes of the World treats this grouping as a subfamily within the family Scorpaenidae, dividing the subfamily into the three tribes: Minoini, Choridactylini and Synanceiini. Other authorities differ in their treatment of this grouping, regarding Synanceiidae as a valid family within the suborder Scorpaenoidei which they include in the order Perciformes, treating the tribes as subfamilies.

Presently, the most up-to-date authorities, e.g Catalog of Fishes, define the Synanceiidae to include other related taxa not included by Fishes of the World, the Apistinae and Tetraroginae, which Fishes of the World places in the Scorpaenidae; as well as the subfamilies Aploactininae, Eschmeyerinae, Gnathanacanthinae, Pataecinae and Perryeninae which are also included, whereas Fishes of the World treats these as families. The "stonefish"-type synanceiids continue to be placed in the subfamily Synanceiinae.

The taxon name is based on that of the genus Synanceia, which was described by Bloch & Schneider in 1801, combining syn, meaning "with", and angeíon, which means "cavity", an allusion to the large, cavernous heads of species placed in the genus.

== Genera ==
The following genera are placed in this family:

- Dampierosa Whitley, 1932
- Erosa Swainson, 1839
- Leptosynanceia Bleeker, 1874
- Pseudosynanceia Day, 1875
- Synanceia Bloch & Schneider, 1801
- Trachicephalus Swainson, 1839

== Characteristics ==
Synanceiinae species are characterised by having bodies which are not covered in scales, with the exception of the embedded scales along their lateral lines and on some other areas of the body. The body is covered with glands in the skin. They have large heads. They typically do not have a swim bladder. There are venom glands at the base of the spines in the dorsal fin, the spines acting like hypodermic syringes to inject the venom. The venom is neurotoxic and is among the most toxic of venoms produced by fishes. It has been known to be fatal to humans.

== Distribution and habitat ==
Synanceiinae species are found in the Indian and Western Pacific Oceans, including the Red Sea. They are found in marine, brackish and freshwater habitats.
