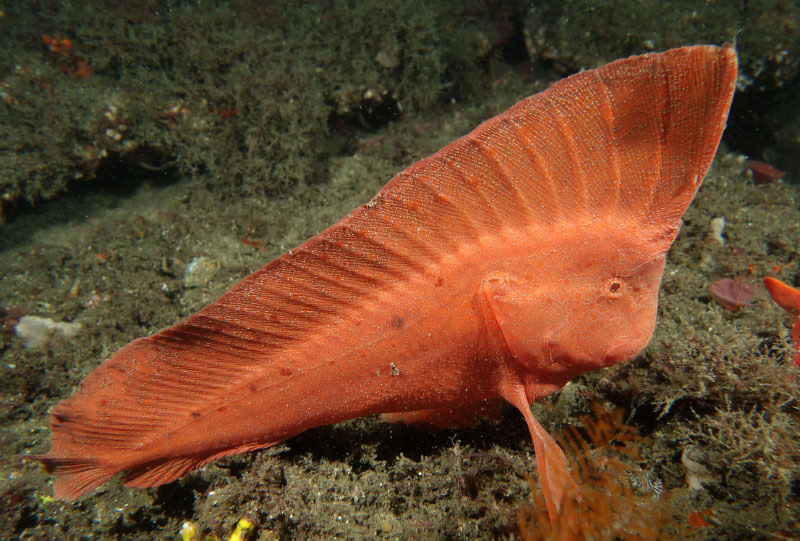

Conservation status
- Least Concern (IUCN 3.1)

Scientific classification
- Kingdom: Animalia
- Phylum: Chordata
- Class: Actinopterygii
- Order: Perciformes
- Family: Synanceiidae
- Subfamily: Pataecinae
- Genus: Pataecus; J. Richardson
- Species: P. fronto

Binomial name
- Pataecus fronto J. Richardson, 1844

= Red Indian fish =

Species of fish

The Red Indian fish (Pataecus fronto), also known as the red forehead fish, is a species of marine ray-finned fish, an Australian prowfish belonging to the subfamily Pataecinae. It is endemic to the coastal waters of western and southern Australia where it occurs at depths of from 5 to 80 metres (16 to 262 ft). This species is the only known member of its genus.

== Taxonomy ==
The Red Indian fish was first formally described in 1844 by the Scottish naval surgeon, Arctic explorer and naturalist John Richardson with the type locality given as Southern Australia. Richardson placed his new species in a new monotypic genus, Pataecus. The 5th edition of Fishes of the World classifies the family Pataecidae, in which this genus is classified, within the suborder Scorpaenoidei which in turn is classified within the order Scorpaeniformes. Other authorities place the Scorpaenoidei within the Perciformes. A recent study placed the Australian prowfishes into an expanded stonefish clade, Synanceiidae, because all of these fish have a lachrymal sabre that can project a switch-blade-like mechanism out from underneath their eye. The name of the genus Pataecus is derived from Pataikos, a strangely shaped dwarf-like Phoenician deity which was used as a figurehead on the prows of ships,. The specific name fronto is derived from the Latin front, meaning "forehead", and is probably an allusion to the dorsal fin originating in front of the eyes.

== Description ==
The Red Indian fish has an elongated, highly compressed body which is deepest towards the head, wedge-shaped with the thinnest part being the caudal peduncle. The relatively small eyes are placed high on the head and the mouth is oblique with tiny teeth on the jaws. The upper part of the operculum has two diagonal low ridges and the head is not spined. The skin is smooth and lacks scales. The long dorsal fin starts on the head in front of the eyes with a short spine but the longest spines are towards the front and they reduce in size towards the tail. The dorsal fin contains between 22 and 25 spines and 14 to 17 soft rays, the anal fin has between 9 and 11 spines and 4 to 7 soft rays. The dorsal fin is joined to the rounded caudal fin. The large pectoral fins are located low on the body and there are no pelvic fins. This species reaches a maximum total length of 35 cm (14 in). The colours may be scarlet, brick red or orange. They are infrequently pale or show black or white spots, sometimes both, mostly on the dorsal part of the body.

== Distribution and habitat ==
The Red Indian fish is endemic to the waters off southern Australia where it is found from Maroochydore in southern Queensland to Barragga Bay in southern New South Wales on the east coast and then from, Gulf St Vincent in South Australia to Shark Bay in Western Australia on the southern and western coasts. This demersal fish is only infrequently recorded in South Australia, suggesting that it may prefer deeper reefs there. It lives within communities of sponges on coastal reefs and estuaries as deep as 80 m (260 ft).

In NSW it is often seen at shallow depths by scuba divers. It is mostly seen inside bays or harbours and almost always only on the northern side of the inlet. Even more interestingly, when seen, it is normally on the northern side of rocks or sponges. It is rare to see on the southern side of inlets or even rocks.

Very little is known about red indianfish from their birth till they reach almost adult size. Few, if any, photos exist of very small specimens.

== Biology ==
The Red Indian fish is more active at night. Their colour and shape provides them with camouflage among their sponge dominated habitat. They are ambush predators and have highly sedentary lives which allows encrusting organisms to colonise their skin, to prevent this they regularly shed their skin. Otherwise little is known of their biology.

== Etymology of common name ==
The Red Indian fish's common name derives from the long, high dorsal fin beginning on the head which resembles the headdress of a Native American chief as seen in popular Western films.
