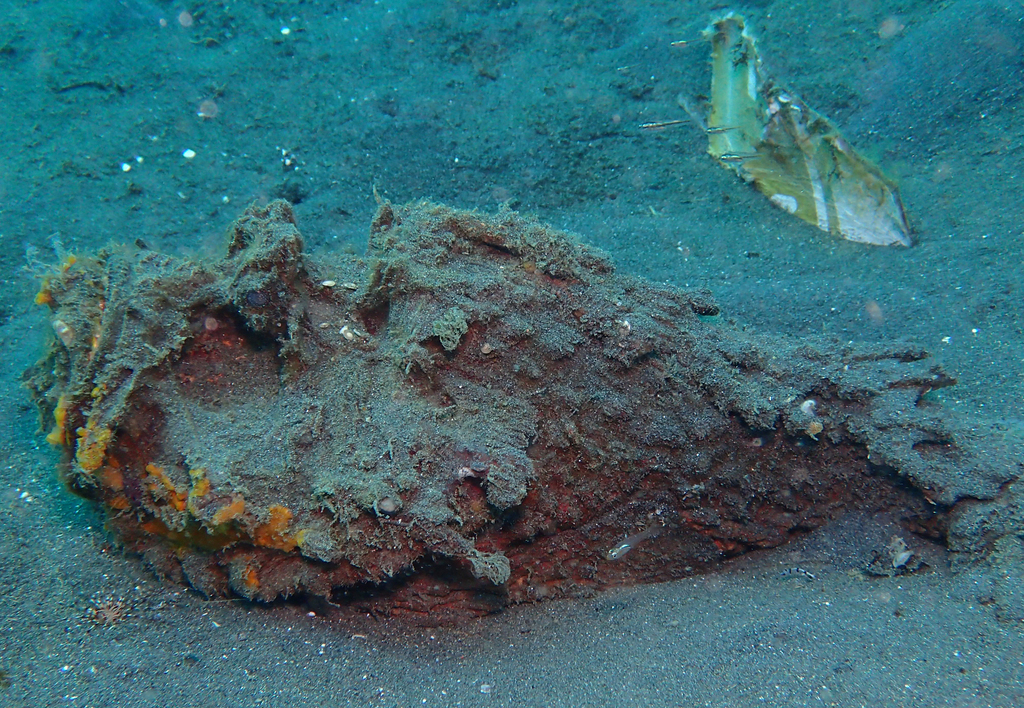
- Stonefish in Lembeh Strait: The fish is facing left, with its left eye visible on the large protrusion.

Conservation status
- Least Concern (IUCN 3.1)

Scientific classification
- Kingdom: Animalia
- Phylum: Chordata
- Class: Actinopterygii
- Division: Teleostei
- Order: Perciformes
- Family: Synanceiidae
- Genus: Synanceia
- Species: S. horrida

Binomial name
- Synanceia horrida (Linnaeus, 1766)

Synonyms
- Scorpaena horrida Linnaeus, 1766; Synanceia trachynis Richardson, 1842

= Synanceia horrida =

Species of fish

Synanceia horrida, the estuarine stonefish, hollow-cheek stonefish, horrid stonefish, rough stonefish, or true stonefish, is a species of venomous, marine, ray-finned fish, a stonefish belonging to the subfamily Synanceiinae, which is classified as being within the family Scorpaenidae, the scorpionfishes and their relatives. It is a benthic fish found in the Indo-Pacific region. This species is considered to be one of the most dangerous venomous fish in the world. It is a popular exhibit in public aquaria and is found in the private aquarium trade.

== Taxonomy ==
Synanceia horrida was first formally described in 1766 as Scorpaena horrida by Carl Linnaeus in volume 1 of his 1766 Systema naturae sive regna tria naturae, with its type locality given as Ambon Island in Indonesia. In 1856, Eugène Anselme Sébastien Léon Desmarest designated this species as the type species of the genus Synanceia, which had been described in 1801 by Marcus Elieser Bloch and Johann Gottlob Theaenus Schneider. The specific name horrida means "dreadful" or "frightful" and is an allusion to its appearance rather than its dangerously venomous spines.

== Description ==
Synanceia horrida is a drab-coloured benthic fish, which can be brownish-grey to reddish or greenish-brown. The skin has no scales, but is covered in warts and often has growths of filamentous algae on it. The head is depressed with small, widely spaced eyes that sit high on the head and are upwards directed. A deep pit is behind and under each eye. The large mouth is almost vertical and has a wide gape and fringing cirrhi on the lips. The pectoral fins are large and fleshy. It has 13 or 14 spines and six soft rays in the dorsal fin, the second to fourth spines being longer than the others. The anal fin has three spines and five soft rays. This species reaches a maximum total length of 60 cm (24 in).

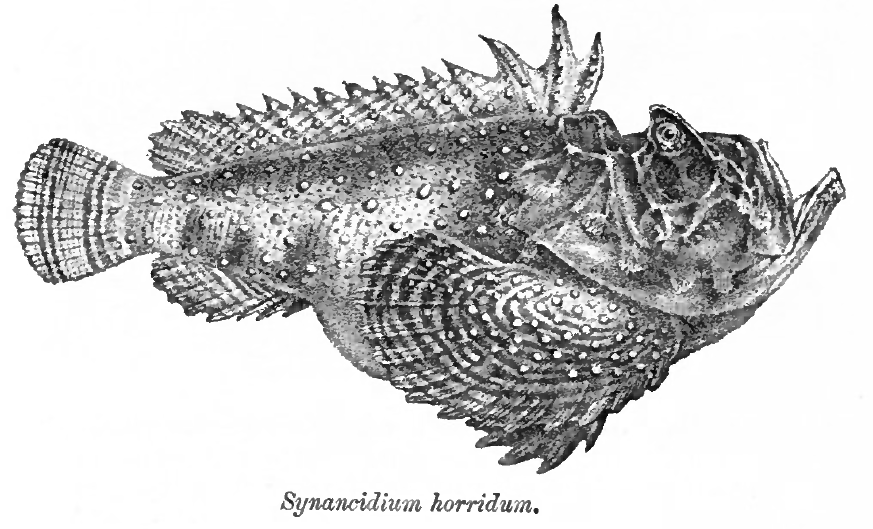
Synanceia horrida Day

== Distribution and habitat ==
Synanceia horrida is found in the Indo-Pacific region, where its range extends from the eastern coast of India to Papua New Guinea, north to southern Japan, and south to Australia. In Australia, it is found from Shark Bay in Western Australia around the tropical northern coast to Coffs Harbour in New South Wales. The estuarine stonefish is found on sheltered inshore reefs and in estuaries, frequently in the shallowest water in coral rubble and rocks on reef flats, as well as in seagrass beds.

== Biology ==
Synanceia horrida is camouflaged, unlike many venomous species, which use bright aposematic colouration to warn off potential predators, and resembles a stone resting on the bottom. It scoops out a depression in the substrate with its large pectoral fins and curls its tail around its body to enhance this camouflage. It is a nocturnal ambush predator, preying on smaller fishes, crustaceans, and cephalopods. The large mouth is used to suck in prey that swims close enough to be engulfed. This species can tolerate being out of the water for up to 24 hours. Little is known about its reproductive biology, other than it is sexual. The females are larger than the males, and it has been observed spawning in aggregations in shallow water over a silt substrate in Queensland.

== Venom ==
Like other stonefishes, S. horrida is regarded as one of the most dangerous venomous fishes. Each fin spine has a fleshy cover at its base that has two venom-producing glands. When the fish is disturbed, it erects its spines; if stepped on, the spines act like hypodermic syringes, injecting venom into the wounds. The venom has effects on the cardiovascular and neuromuscular systems. The sting is extremely painful and has been known to be lethal. Antivenom can be administered following envenomation. Since European settlement, no deaths have been recorded in Australia as a result of stonefish venom, but such deaths have been recorded elsewhere in its range. Immersion of the sting wound in hot water can also be used to denature the venom.

== Uses ==
This species is popular as a new exhibit in public aquaria and is sometimes found in the home aquarium trade. It is occasionally taken by subsistence fisheries, and it appears in some Asia live fish markets. It has been considered as a potential species for aquaculture.
