= Leptosynanceia =

Scientific classification
- Kingdom: Animalia
- Phylum: Chordata
- Class: Actinopterygii
- Order: Perciformes
- Family: Synanceiidae
- Subfamily: Synanceiinae
- Genus: Leptosynanceia; Bleeker, 1874
- Species: L. asteroblepa

Binomial name
- Leptosynanceia asteroblepa (J. Richardson, 1844)

Synonyms
- Synanceia asteroblepa Richardson, 1844

Genus of fishes

Leptosynanceia is a monotypic genus of ray-finned fish belonging to the subfamily Synanceiinae, the stonefishes, which is classified within the family Scorpaenidae, the scorpionfishes and relatives; its only species, Leptosynanceia asteroblepa, is called the mangrove stonefish in Malaysia. This species native to the brackish and fresh waters of Southeast Asia. This species grows to a total length of 23 centimetres (9.1 in). This species is an extremely dangerous fish whose venom can cause a human to die within 1 to 2 hours after contact. The pain caused by the venom is described as "agonizing".

== Taxonomy ==
Leptosynanceia was first formally described as a genus by the Dutch physician and zoologist Pieter Bleeker as a monotypic genus, with Synanceia asteroblepa, described by John Richardson from the coast of New Guinea, as its only species. The genus Leptosynanceia is classified within the tribe Synanceiini which is one of three tribes in the subfamily Synanceiinae within the family Scorpaenidae. Alternatively Synanceiidae may be considered a valid family, and in this case Synanceiini is considered as the subfamily Synanceiinae. The genus name is a combination of lepto meaning "thin" and Synanceia, the "typical" stonefish genus to which Richardson originally assigned this species, alluding to its more slender body than those stonefishes. The specific name is a compound of asteros, meaning "star", and blepos, meaning "see", to mean "stargazer", an allusion to the upturned eyes on the top of the head, similar to the unrelated stargazers of Uranoscopidae.

== Description ==
Leptosynanceia possesses almost vertical mouths along with eyes on the dorsal surface of their head, which are directed outwards and upwards. The dorsal fin has 16 spines and 5 soft rays. The anal fin has 3-4 spines and 5 or 6 soft rays and there is a single spine and 4 soft rays in the pelvic fin. This fish attains a maximum total length of 23 cm (9.1 in). The colour is pale brown, slightly paler ventrally with a mottled head and darker blotches on the body.

== Distribution and habitat ==
Leptosynanceia is found in the eastern Indian Ocean and the western Pacific Ocean. It has been recorded from Singapore, Sumatra, Borneo and New Guinea, It is found in fresh water rivers and brackish water estuarine environments.
