= Eric Oswald Gale Scott =

Australian teacher, museum director, ichthyologist and pacifist (1899–1986)

Eric Oswald Gale Scott (18 October 1899 – 24 June 1986) was an Australian teacher, museum director, ichthyologist and pacifist. He was the director of the Queen Victoria Museum and Art Gallery in Launceston, Tasmania.

== Early life and education ==
Eric Oswald Gale Scott was born on 18 October 1899 in Launceston, son of Herbert Hedley Scott, a curator at the Queen Victoria Museum and Art Gallery, and Frances Fanny, (née Stearnes).

Scott attended Launceston State High School, where he was awarded a university prize for English language and literature and the James Scott Memorial Prize in 1917.

He then attended the Philip Smith Training College. He started studying for a bachelor's degree in science at the University of Tasmania, while working first as a teacher, and after an interruption, continued during his employment at the museum, eventually completing his degree in 1933.

== Career ==
Scott was a science teacher at both Launceston State High School and Devonport State High School between 1918 and 1923. He was also acting head teacher at Epping State School.

Two years into his degree, Scott's health broke down, and in 1924 he went to Europe. There he visited a number of leading museums, returning to Launceston in 1925 to take up a position as a science and maths master, as well as a sports master role, at Scotch College. He remained at Scotch College until 1929, when he resigned to finish his degree.

In 1930, he was appointed as an assistant curator at the Queen Victoria Museum and Art Gallery. He completed his degree in 1933, specialising in biology. Between 1930 and 1938 Scott worked with his father, assisting him with some of the routine curatorial work, as well as co-writing weekly newspaper articles. Eric Scott taught courses on biology and English poetry for the Workers’ Educational Association. In 1934, Scott's first research paper. "Observations on some Tasmanian fishes" was published in the Royal Society of Tasmania Papers and Proceedings.

On receipt of a grant from the Carnegie Corporation of New York, Scott travelled to New York in 1938 to study methods used in museums and art galleries in North America and Europe, but he had been away for only a week when he was informed of the death of his father. Nevertheless, he remain abroad and travelled for seven months, during which he visited 200 institutions in 20 countries.

Following his return to Launceston he was appointed as director of the Queen Victoria Museum and Art Gallery in November 1938. He resigned from this post in 1942, when he served a sentence of a month in prison for his refusal to undergo a medical examination after the authorities refused to give him conscientious objector status. He was jailed for the same reason in 1943, this time for three months. He was imprisoned again in May 1945 for refusing to obey manpower directives, stating that this was because of his Christian beliefs. He ceased to be active in herpetology in 1942.

He returned to teaching from 1949, teaching language and science for private schools in Launceston until he retired in 1964.

He focused his attention to ichthyology for over 50 years, being the author of in excess of 50 published research papers and other works. With Peter Last and Frank Talbot, Scott co-authored Fishes of Tasmania, which was published in 1983.

== Other activities ==
Scott was the honorary secretary of the Royal Society of Tasmania from 1931 to 1937 and 1939 to 1943.

== Recognition ==
In 1965 he was appointed as an honorary associate in ichthyology at the Queen Victoria Museum and Art Gallery, re-formalising the links he had kept with that institution.

In 1987 the Royal Society of Tasmania gave him the posthumous award of its medal for his work in zoology. It was the first ever posthumous award of the RST Medal and his son, Dr D. Scott, accepted the medal on his father's behalf.

== Later life, death, and legacy ==
Scott had another brush with the law in 1971 when, with his wife Freda, refused to take a compulsory chest X-ray mandated by the Tuberculosis Act.

He died on 24 June 1986 after being hit by a car in Launceston. Freda (née Freda Hazel Lloyd), who he had married in 1927, and a son and two daughters survived him.

Scott is honoured in the specific name of a species of clingfish, Alabes scotti. He had brought this species to the attention of Barry Hutchins of the Western Australian Museum in 1982, saying it was an undescribed species, showing him a sketch. Scott did not describe it and Hutchins and Sue Morrison published a description in 2004, naming it after Scott.
