= Stonustoxin =

Poison of the stonefish

Stonustoxin (SNTX) is an extremely potent cytolytic toxin of the perforin-like superfamily. It is mainly found in stonefish (Synanceia). The name Stonustoxin is an abbreviation of STOnefish National University of Singapore + toxin.

== History ==
Little is known about the biological activity and composition of marine fish venoms, due to the difficulties in obtaining, storing and extracting venom samples. The National University of Singapore performed the first purification of the stonefish venom, because stonefish stings have been responsible for a number of deaths and severe poisoning cases in the local area. The molecular weight was determined by high performance liquid chromatography at pH 7.0 using 10 mM sodium phosphate buffer with 0.2M sodium sulfate in a gel permeation column at a flow rate of 1.0 ml/min.

== Structure ==
The exact conformation of stonustoxin has been described. Stonustoxin is a heterodimer composed of stonustoxin-a and stonustoxin-ß. The tertiary structure of each subunit possesses a domain capable of binding to cellular membranes, and a domain securing the structure of the protein itself. The quaternary structure of stonustoxin can be described as a large pore. The subunits forming said pore are held together by weak intermolecular forces such as hydrogen bonds.

== Mechanism of action ==
Stonustoxin contains an N-terminal domain homologous to the MACPF. When this domain comes into contact with tissues of a victim, the MACPF domain enables stonustoxin to adhere to a cellular membrane and form a pore, generally leading to cellular death. This particular pore forming ability can be used on a large variety of tissues, explaining the many different physiological responses. The formation of pores in capillaries, for example, is the cause of hypotension caused by stonefish envenomation.

== Adverse effects ==
The venom of the stonefish consists of different toxins, which enhance each other's destructive ability. Besides stonustoxin, it also contains hyaluronidase and cardioleputin. Hyaluronidase damages the tissue surrounding the sting, causing a burning, stinging sensation. Stonustoxine increases the blood vessel's permeability and dilates capillaries, enabling a faster distribution of the venom. Finally, cardioleputin increases heart rate which further speeds up the distribution of the venom throughout the entire bloodstream. The dilation of capillaries is the cause of the hypotension. At first, it was thought that the impairment of the respiratory system due to paralysis of the skeletal muscles was the main cause of death in stonefish venom envenomation cases, however, it was found that hypotension was the main cause of the venom's lethality (Low, 1993). Envenomation by the stonefish will result in extreme pain, edema, hypotension, respiratory distress, internal bleeding, and in some occasions, death.

== Treatment and metabolism ==
There is an antivenom for stonefish envenomation, but since it has to be kept away from light at temperatures between 0 °C and 5 °C, delivery of the antivenom to the tropical regions where stonefish stings occur is often very problematic. However, immersion in hot water has been tested as a way of rendering stonustoxin inactive. Since stonustoxin is composed of various subunits, it is susceptible to structural changes caused by heat. The weak intermolecular forces connecting the tertiary and quaternary structures are weakened by extreme heat. If the temperature limits are exceeded, stonustoxin could lose its function. An attempt at protein denaturation to treat stonefish stings made by Darlene and Phee-Keng. When a 47-year-old woman stung by a stonefish while diving was brought to the hospital, various anesthetics were administered but her pain remained severe. Her foot was later immersed in a tub of hot water. Temperatures were kept as high as possible without scalding the patient. After an hour of immersion, her pain was substantially relieved and swelling decreased.
