= Ptah-Patek =

Egyptian deity

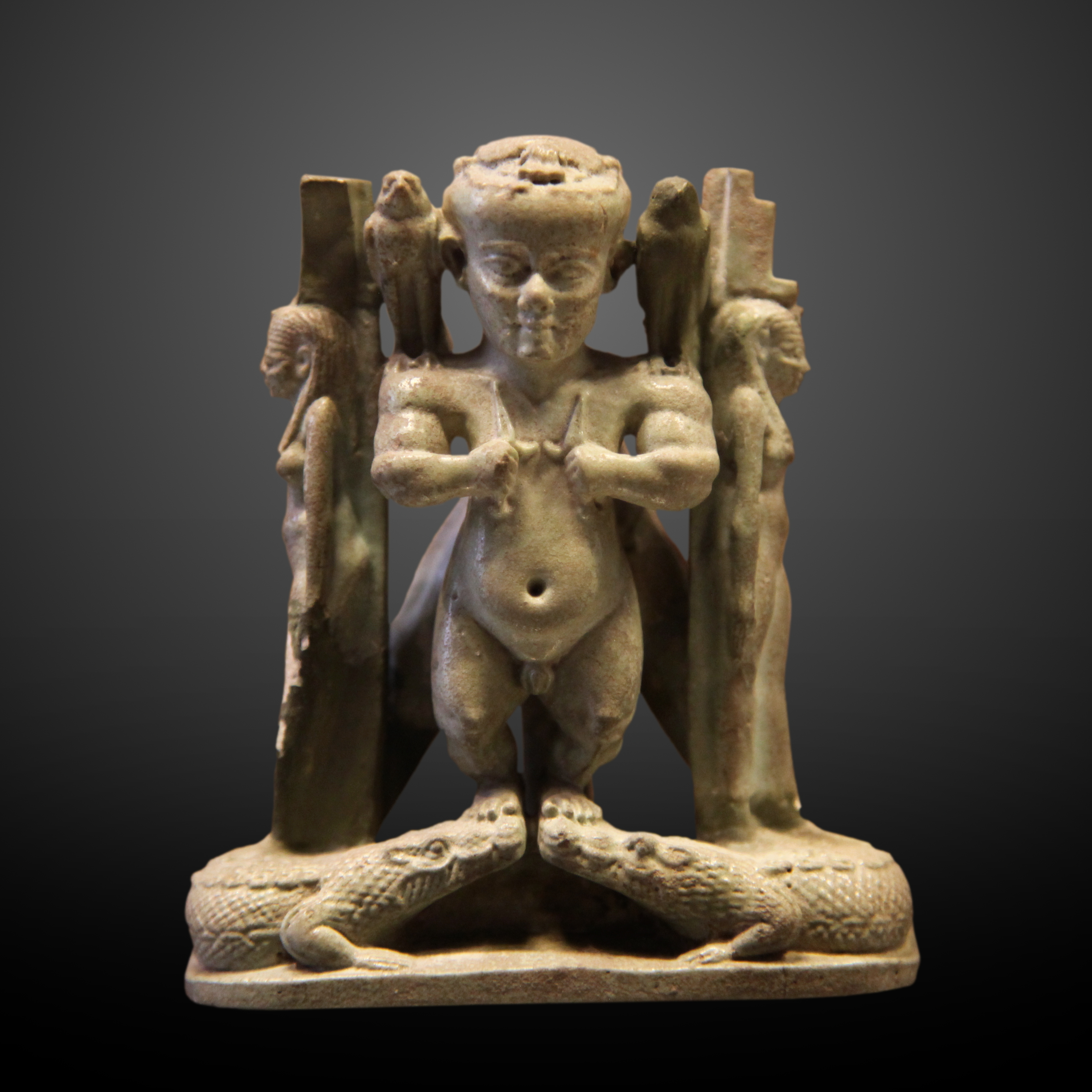
- Ptah-Patek figurine, Louvre, 4th–3rd century BC
- Other names: Pateco, Pataikos
- Major cult center: Memphis

Ptah-Patek, or Pataikos, is protective dwarf deity in ancient Egyptian religion that appears primarily on amulets. Many of these have been found in Phoenician and Punic centers throughout the Mediterranean, but also in Etruria and to a lesser extent in Greece.

== Origins ==
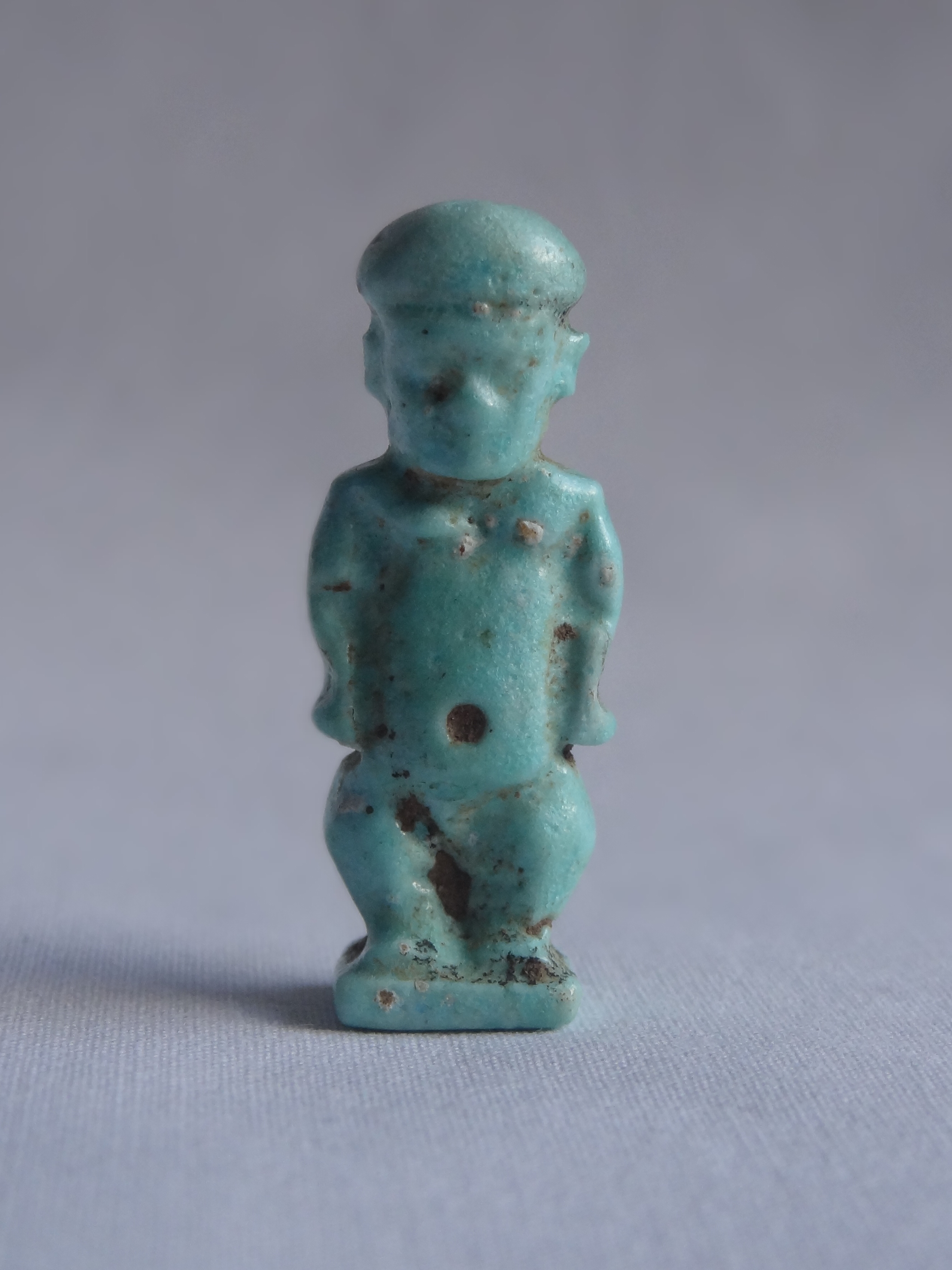
Ptah-Patek amulet, faience, private collection, France, from Egypt, 26th dynasty—30th dynasty

The name "Pataikos" comes from Herodotus who, in his Histories, refers by this name to the figureheads of Phoenician ships in the form of a protective dwarf. Herodotus described Ptah-Patek as a son of or a manifestation of Ptah, and thus calls him "Pataikos", which means "little Ptah".

The deity's connection with Ptah comes from the dwarves who, in Egyptian Antiquity, were generally associated with experts in metallurgy.

== Attributes and representation ==
Ptah-Patek is generally represented as a deformed, naked, green dwarf with a potbelly and a head disproportionate to his body. However, there are rare cases where he is adorned with a necklace and a crown that surmounts his skullcap. Unlike Ptah, he possesses neither the Djed pillar, nor the Was scepter, nor the ankh, nor the false beard symbolic of royalty. Their only similarity lies in the wearing of the skullcap atop their heads. He frequently wore a scarab on his head, which was a symbol of solar creation and regeneration.

During the Late Period of Egypt, Ptah-Patek was often shown with characteristics of Harpocrates, Bes, and Horus, including holding either serpents or knives in his hands, falcons sitting on his shoulders, and standing on top of crocodiles.

== As a protector ==
Ptah-Patek was frequently represented in faience amulets that were believed to protect its wearer from evil forces, dangerous animals, and chaos.

Along with Bes, Ptah-Patek was an assistant of Taweret during childbirth, and was associated with women and children. In spells to speed up childbirth, a figurine of Bes or Pataikos would be placed on the forehead of the pregnant woman.

== Cult ==
Ptah-Patek's popularity grew in Late Period Egypt when Egyptian people, who associated the deity with the god Bes from the Twenty-second Dynasty of Egypt onwards, exported the cult throughout the Eastern Mediterranean into the Hellenistic period.

== See also ==
- Ptah
- Bes

== Bibliography ==
- Philippe Germond, "The Symbolic World of Egyptian Amulets: From the Jacques-Édouard Berger Collection," Éditions 5 Continents, 2005;
- Alain-Pierre Zivie, Memphis and its Necropolises in the New Kingdom, Éditions du CNRS, 1988.
