= Leonard Radinsky =

American paleontologist

Leonard Burton Radinsky (1937–1985) was an American paleontologist and expert in fossil odd-toed ungulates and their relatives. He was professor at the University of Chicago from 1967 until his death, serving as chairman of the Department of Anatomy from 1978 to 1983. Born in Staten Island, New York, he earned a bachelor's degree from Cornell University (1958) and his master's and doctorate degrees from Yale University. His works include "Origin and early evolution of North American Tapiroidea", "The fossil record of primate brain evolution", and the textbook The Evolution of Vertebrate Design.
