= Eurycephalus (genus) =

Eurycephalus is an invalid longhorn beetle generic name first published by the British zoologist John Edward Gray in 1831. It is now considered to be a junior objective synonym of the genus Tapeina established by the French entomologists Amédée Lepeletier and Jean Guillaume Audinet-Serville in 1828. Several other organisms were also named Eurycephalus by other zoologists that have since been invalidated. They are listed below with their current accepted name:

- Eurycephalus Dejean, 1835 (junior homonym) = Euryphagus J. Thomson, 1864

- A cerambycid beetle genus belonging to the tribe Trachyderini

- Eurycephalus Imamura, 1996 (junior homonym) = Sunagocia Imamura, 2003

- A genus of flathead fish

- Eurycephalus Agassiz, 1846 (misspelling) = Eurocephalus A. Smith, 1836

- A genus of passerine birds in the shrike family
