= Semi-armed flathead =

Scientific classification
- Kingdom: Animalia
- Phylum: Chordata
- Class: Actinopterygii
- Order: Perciformes
- Family: Platycephalidae
- Genus: Leviprora
- Species: L. semermis

Binomial name
- Leviprora semermis (De Vis, 1883)

Synonyms
- Platycephalus semermis De Vis, 1883

Species of fish

The semi-armed flathead (Leviprora semermis) is a species of marine ray-finned fish belonging to the family Platycephalidae, the flatheads. This species is endemic to the coastal waters of southern Australia. It was confirmed as a valid species in 2020.

== Taxonomy ==
The semi-armed flathead was first formally described in 1883 as Platycephalus semermis by the English zoologist and botanist Charles Walter De Vis with the type locality given as the north end of Long Island, Houtman Abrolhos in Western Australia. This species was regarded as being a synonym of the longhead flathead (L. inops) until 2020 when it was recognised as a valid species. De Vis did not explain the specific name semermis but it may mean semi-armed because although it has a snooth head there are spines on the operculum and preoperculum.

== Description ==
The semi-armed flathead is largely pale brown in colour marked with a number of dark brown bands across the back and vague small spots along the flanks. There is a thick diagonal brown band on the spiny dorsal fin and brown spots and short lines on the soft-rayed dorsal fin with bands of small dark spots on the pectoral fins. The nanal fin is pale with vaguely defined larger spots at its base while the caudal fin is marked with small dark spots and short lines which form irregular bands. There is no obvious brown band running through the eyes over the crown. The semi-armed flathead differs from the longhead flathead in having 18 or 19 rays in the pectoral fins compared to 20 or 21 in the longhead flathead, the possession of a preocular spine. The do not have the fleshy sensory tubes on the cheek region while L. inops does. There is a single ducts in each pored scale in the lateral line while L. inops has two and having larger eyes set closer together, although this varies with growth.

== Distribution and habitat ==
The semi-armed flathead is endemic to Western Australia where it is found from south of Point Dover near Caiguna in the Great Australian Bight to west of Cape Lesueur near Shark Bay. This species occurs at depths between 16 and 50 m (52 and 164 ft).
