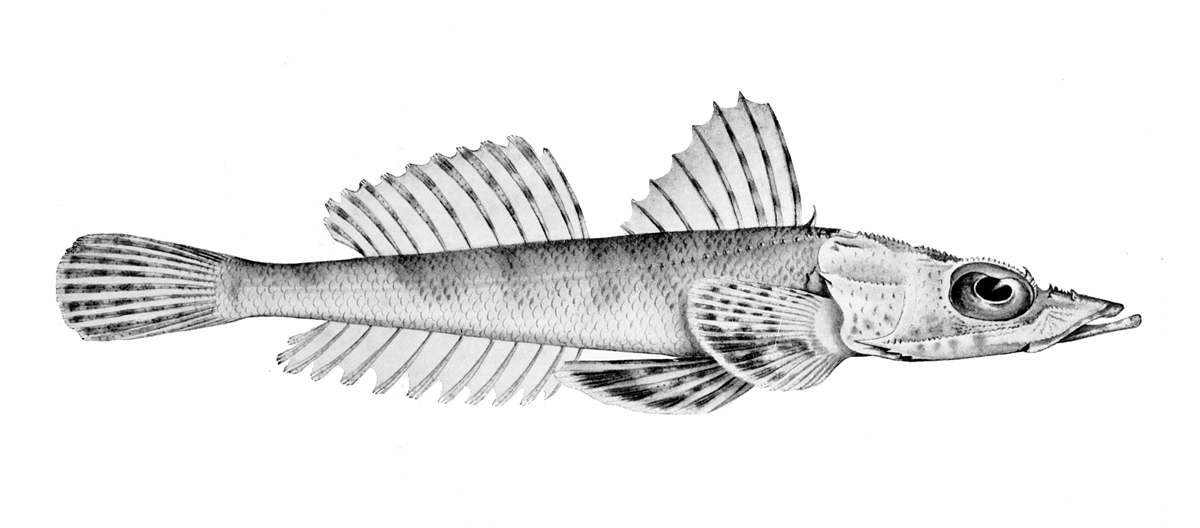
- Tuberculated flathead (S. tuberculata)

Scientific classification
- Kingdom: Animalia
- Phylum: Chordata
- Class: Actinopterygii
- Order: Perciformes
- Family: Platycephalidae
- Genus: Sorsogona; Herre, 1934

Type species
- Sorsogona serrulata Herre, 1934

= Sorsogona =

Genus of fishes

Sorsogona is a genus of flatheads native to the Indian Ocean and the western Pacific Ocean.

== Species ==
There are currently six recognized species in this genus:

- Sorsogona humerosa L. W. Knapp & Heemstra, 2011 (White-margined flathead)
- Sorsogona melanoptera L. W. Knapp & Wongratana, 1987 (Obscure flathead)
- Sorsogona nigripinna (Regan, 1905) (Blackfin flathead)
- Sorsogona portuguesa (J. L. B. Smith, 1953) (South African thorny flathead)
- Sorsogona prionota (Sauvage, 1873) (Halfspined flathead)
- Sorsogona tuberculata (G. Cuvier, 1829) (Tuberculated flathead)

Sorsogona is recognised by Fishbase but, apparently, does not include the type species, Sorsogona serrulata, as a species within it. Catalog of Fishes treats this genus as a synonym of Ratabulus.
