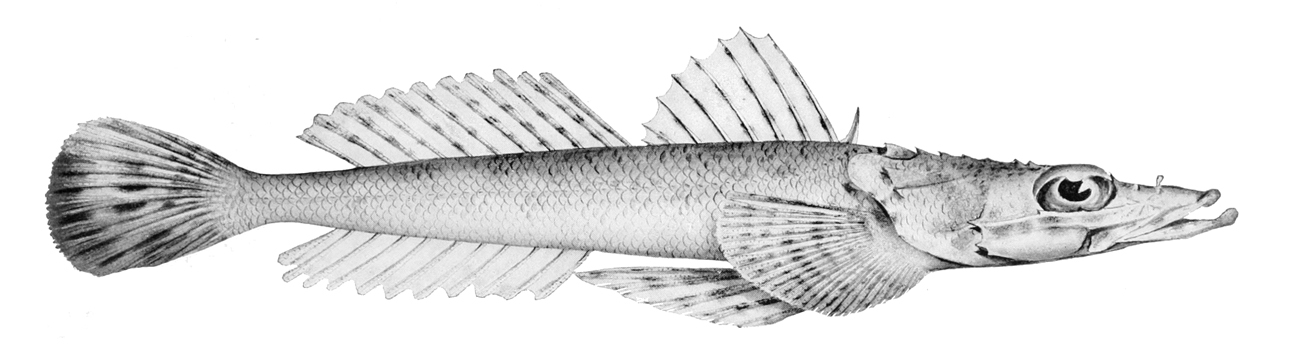
- Harris' flathead (I. harrisii)
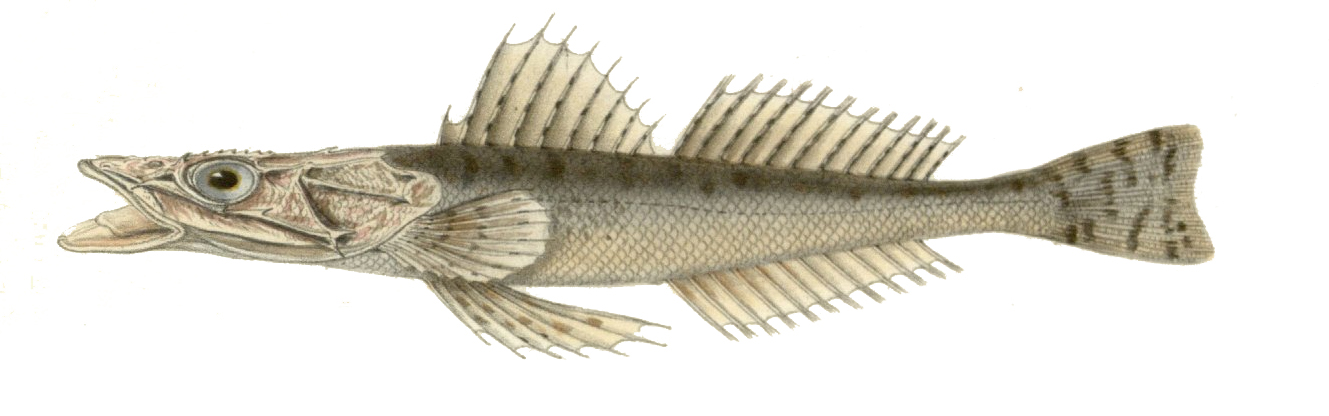
- Japanese flathead (I. japonica)

Scientific classification
- Kingdom: Animalia
- Phylum: Chordata
- Class: Actinopterygii
- Order: Perciformes
- Family: Platycephalidae
- Genus: Inegocia; D. S. Jordan & W. F. Thompson, 1913

Type species
- Platycephalus japonicus Tilesius, 1814

= Inegocia =

Genus of fishes

Inegocia is a genus of marine ray-finned fishes belonging to the family Platycephalidae, the flatheads. These fishes are found in the Indo-Pacific region.

== Taxonomy ==
Inegocia was first proposed as a genus in 1913 by the American ichthyologists David Starr Jordan and William Francis Thompson with Platycephalus japonicus, which had been described by the German naturalist Wilhelm Gottlieb Tilesius von Tilenau in 1814, as the type species. Tilesius name was originally published in Cyrillic script and in 1829 Cuvier published the name in Latin script, and this is the accepted name under the International Code of Zoological Nomenclature. This genus is classified within the family Playtcephalidae, the flatheads which the 5th edition of Fishes of the World classifies within the suborder Platycephaloidei in the order Scorpaeniformes. The genus name Inegocia is a latinisation of inegochi, which means "rice flathead", a Japanese common name for I. japonica. Gochi, which is also spelled kochi, is a general Japanese name for flatheads and dragonets.

== Species ==
Inegocia contains three recognised species:

- Inegocia harrisii (McCulloch, 1914) (Harris's flathead)
- Inegocia japonica (G. Cuvier, 1829) (Japanese flathead)
- Inegocia ochiaii Imamura, 2010

== Characteristics ==
Inegocia flatheads are characterised by the possession of a long iris lappet which is branched dorsally. They do not have an obvious pit on the rear margin of the orbit. They also do not have sensory tubes in the cheek area between the suborbital and the preoperculum. In addition, there is a clear flap between the eyes. The smallest of the three species is I. harrisi with a maximum published total length of 24 cm (9.4 in) and the largest is I. ochiaii with a maximum published standard length of 44.4 cm (17.5 in).

== Distribution ==
Inegocia flatheads are found in the eastern Indian Ocean and the western Pacific Ocean, from Sri Lanka in the west to the Philippines, north to Japan and south to Australia.
