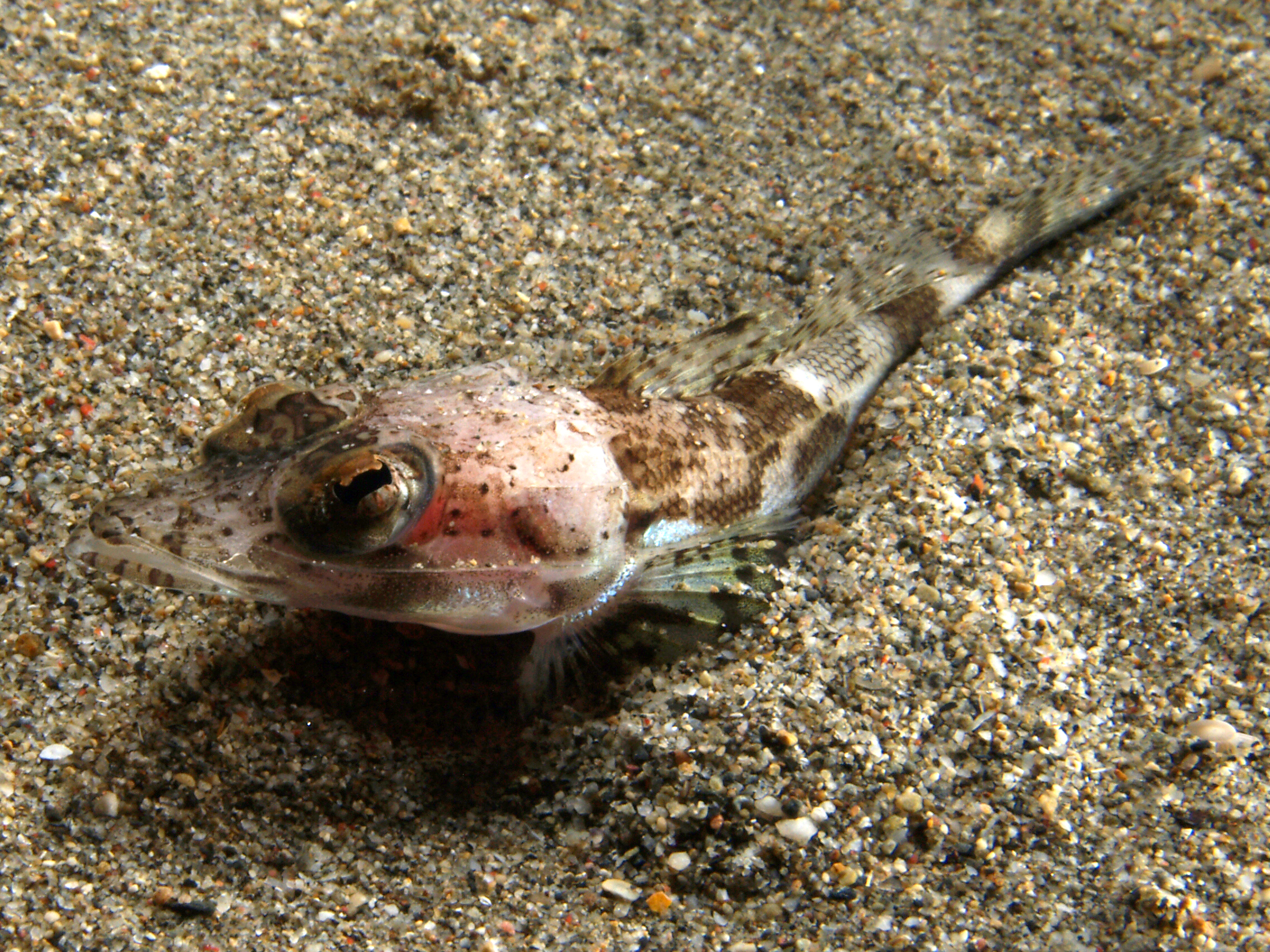

Scientific classification
- Kingdom: Animalia
- Phylum: Chordata
- Class: Actinopterygii
- Order: Perciformes
- Family: Platycephalidae
- Genus: Elates; D. S. Jordan & Seale, 1907
- Species: E. ransonnettii

Binomial name
- Elates ransonnettii (Steindachner, 1876)

Synonyms
- Platycephalus ransonnettii Steindachner, 1876; Elates thompsoni Jordan & Seale, 1907; Hyalorhynchus pellucidus Ogilby, 1910

= Dwarf flathead =

Species of fish

The dwarf flathead (Elates ransonnettii) is a species of marine ray-finned fish belonging to the family Platycephalidae, the flatheads. It is found in the Indo-Pacific. It is the only species in the monotypic genus Elates.

== Taxonomy ==
The dwarf flathead was first formally described in 1876 as Platycephalus ransonnettii by the Austrian ichthyologist Franz Steindachner with the type locality given as Singapore. In 1907 the American ichthyologists David Starr Jordan and Alvin Seale described a new species, Elates thompsoni. from Manila which they placed in a new monotypic genus but this was later considered to be a synonym of Steindachner's P. ransonnettii although the genus is considered to be valid. This genus is classified within the family Playtcephalidae, the flatheads which the 5th edition of Fishes of the World classifies within the suborder Platycephaloidei in the order Scorpaeniformes.

== Etymology ==
Elates is Greek for "leader" or "driver", Jordan and Seale did not explain their choice of this name. The specific name honours the Austrian diplomat, painter, lithographer, biologist and explorer Eugen von Ransonnet-Villez who collected fishes in Singapore and sent them, including specimens of this species, to Steindachner.

== Description ==
The dwarf flathead has 6 spines in its first dorsal fin and 13-14 soft rays in both the second dorsal fin and the anal fin. The body is elongated with a moderately flattened head with a relatively small mouth which ends in front of the eye, below the front nostril. There is a single long bayonet-like spine on the preoperculum, often extending past the rear margin of the operculum, with no accessory spine. The supraorbital ridge is smooth and there is a preorbital spine and a preocular spine. There are two spines on the suborbital ridge, a short spine under the front part of the eye and a long spine below the rear of the eye/ There are two distinct patches of vomerine teeth. The lappet on the iris is a simple lobe. The caudal fin has an elongated filament extending from its upper lobe. This species is sandy coloured with a dusky coloured blotch on the operculum and there are a few oval blotches along the flanks> The dorsal and caudal fins are marked with dark spots. The maximum published total length of this species is 19 cm (7.5 in), although 15 cm (5.9 in) is more typical.

== Distribution and habitat ==
The dwarf flathead is found in inshore and continental shelf waters in the Indo–West Pacific from the Gulf of Thailand and the Philippines to Papua New Guinea and south to Australia. In Australia it occurs from off Exmouth in Western Australia to Pine Peak Island in Queensland. It was reported twice in the Mediterranean Sea, off Italy in 2005 and Croatia in 2010, likely introduced via ballast water.

It is found in sandy areas at depths between 5 and 95 m (16 and 312 ft), although there is a record from 221 m (725 ft).
