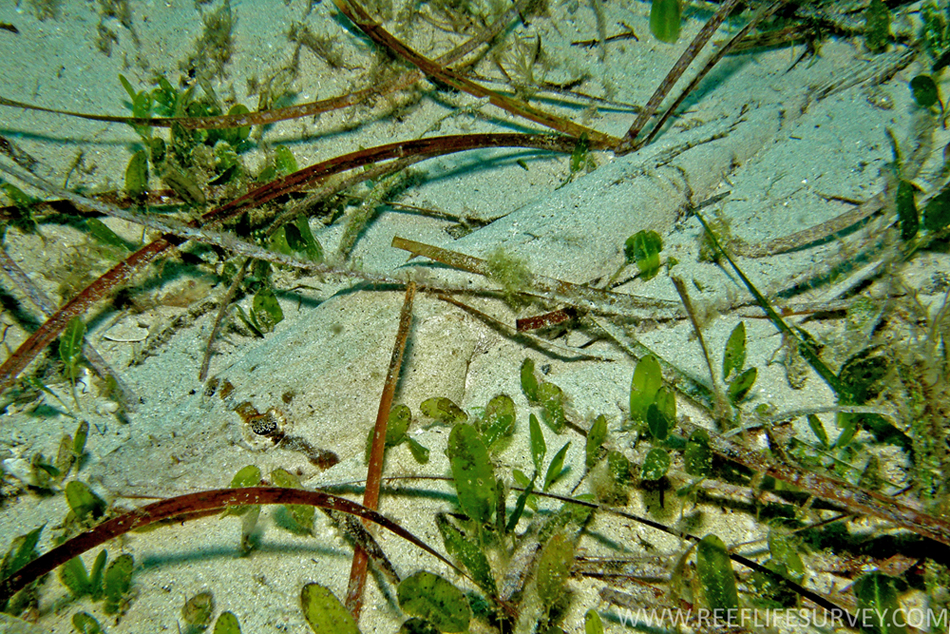
- A well-camouflaged Longhead flathead (Levipora inops) at Albany, Western Australia

Scientific classification
- Kingdom: Animalia
- Phylum: Chordata
- Class: Actinopterygii
- Order: Perciformes
- Family: Platycephalidae
- Genus: Leviprora; Whitley, 1931

Type species
- Platycephalus inops Jenyns 1840

= Leviprora =

Genus of fishes

Leviprora is a genus of marine ray-finned fishes belonging to the family Platycephalidae, the flatheads. These fishes are endemic to the waters of southwestern Australia.

== Taxonomy ==
Leviprora was first proposed as a monotypic genus in 1931 by the Australian ichthyologist Gilbert Percy Whitley. Whitley designated Platycephalus inops, which had been described by Leonard Jenyns in 1840 from Western Australia, as its type species. This genus is classified within the family Playtcephalidae, the flatheads which the 5th edition of Fishes of the World classifies within the suborder Platycephaloidei in the order Scorpaeniformes. The genus name Leviprora is a compound of levis, meaning "smooth", and prora, which means "prow", thought to be an allusion to the absence of exposed bony ridges on upper surface of skull in L. inops.

== Species ==
There are two recognised species within the genus Leviprora:

- Leviprora inops Jenyns, 1840 (Longhead flathead)
- Leviprora semermis De Vis, 1883 (Semi-armed flathead)

For a long time L. semermis was considered to be a junior synonym of L. inops but it is now considered a valid species.

== Distribution and habitat ==
Leviprora flatheads are endemic to southwestern Australia where they are found from Shark Bay in Western Australia to Point Dover and Kangaroo Island in the Great Australian Bight in South Australia. These fishes, are found at depths down to 50 m (160 ft), although L. inops may have a preference for shallower waters.
