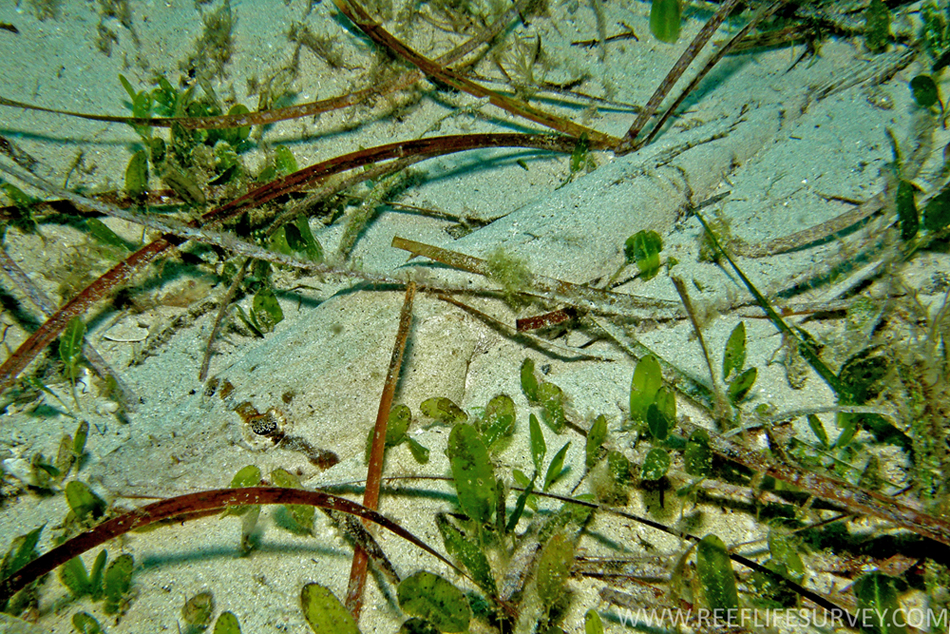
- A well-camouflaged longhead flathead (Levipora inops) at Albany, Western Australia

Conservation status
- Least Concern (IUCN 3.1)

Scientific classification
- Kingdom: Animalia
- Phylum: Chordata
- Class: Actinopterygii
- Division: Teleostei
- Order: Perciformes
- Family: Platycephalidae
- Genus: Leviprora
- Species: L. inops

Binomial name
- Leviprora inops (Jenyns, 1840)

Synonyms
- Platycephalus inops Jenyns, 1840; Platycephalus haackei Steindachner, 1883

= Longhead flathead =

Species of fish

The longhead flathead (Leviprora inops), also known as the crocodile flathead or weed flathead, is a species of marine ray-finned fish belonging to the family Platycephalidae, the flatheads. This species is endemic to reefs in the coastal waters of southern Australia.

== Taxonomy ==
The longhead flathead was first formally described in 1840 as Platycephalus inops by the English naturalist Leonard Jenyns with the type locality given as King George Sound in Western Australia. In 1931 by the Australian ichthyologist Gilbert Percy Whitley designated it as the type species of the new monotypic genus Leviprora. The genus was widely considered to be monotypic until Leviprora semermis was recognised as a valid species in 2020. The specific name inops means "poor", "weak" or "helpless", Jenyns did not explain why he chose this name but it may be a reference to the smooth head, which he described "with hardly anything deserving the name of spines, excepting only a small flat spine terminating the opercle, and a minute but sharp one on the upper ridge of the scapula," and/or "very short and inconspicuous" spines on the preoperculum.

== Description ==
The longhead flathead has an elongated, slightly flattened body with a very long head, the length of the head being two-fifths of its standard length. The head is highly flattened and comparatively smooth with very few low, bony ridges and large eyes which have a long, fringed lappet on the iris. The mouth is large with a wide band of small teeth on each of the jaws and two distinct patches of vomerine teeth. There are two very small spines on the angle of the preoperculum. The short based first dorsal fin contains 8 or 9 spines with the first spine being separate and very short. The second dorsal fin is long based and contains 12 soft rays. The anal fin is opposite the second dorsal fin and is similar in shape with between 11 and 13 soft rays. The maximum recorded length is 61 cm (24 in) ans maximum weight is no less than 2.5 kg (5.5 lb). The upper body is sandy to pinkish marked with irregularly shaped spots and blotches, paler on the lower body. The fins are marked with vague lines of dark and light spots and there is a diagonal brown band on the upper part of the first dorsal fin.

== Distribution and habitat ==
The long head flathead is endemic to southwestern Australia where it occurs from Kangaroo Island and Gulf St Vincent in South Australia west to the Swan River in Western Australia. This species lives in shallow coastal waters, particularly on rocky reefs covered in dense vegetation while the juveniles are frequently observed buried in sand in seagrass beds. It is found at depths down to 20 m (66 ft).

== Biology ==
The longhead flathead preys largely on fish but will also take large benthic crustaceans.
