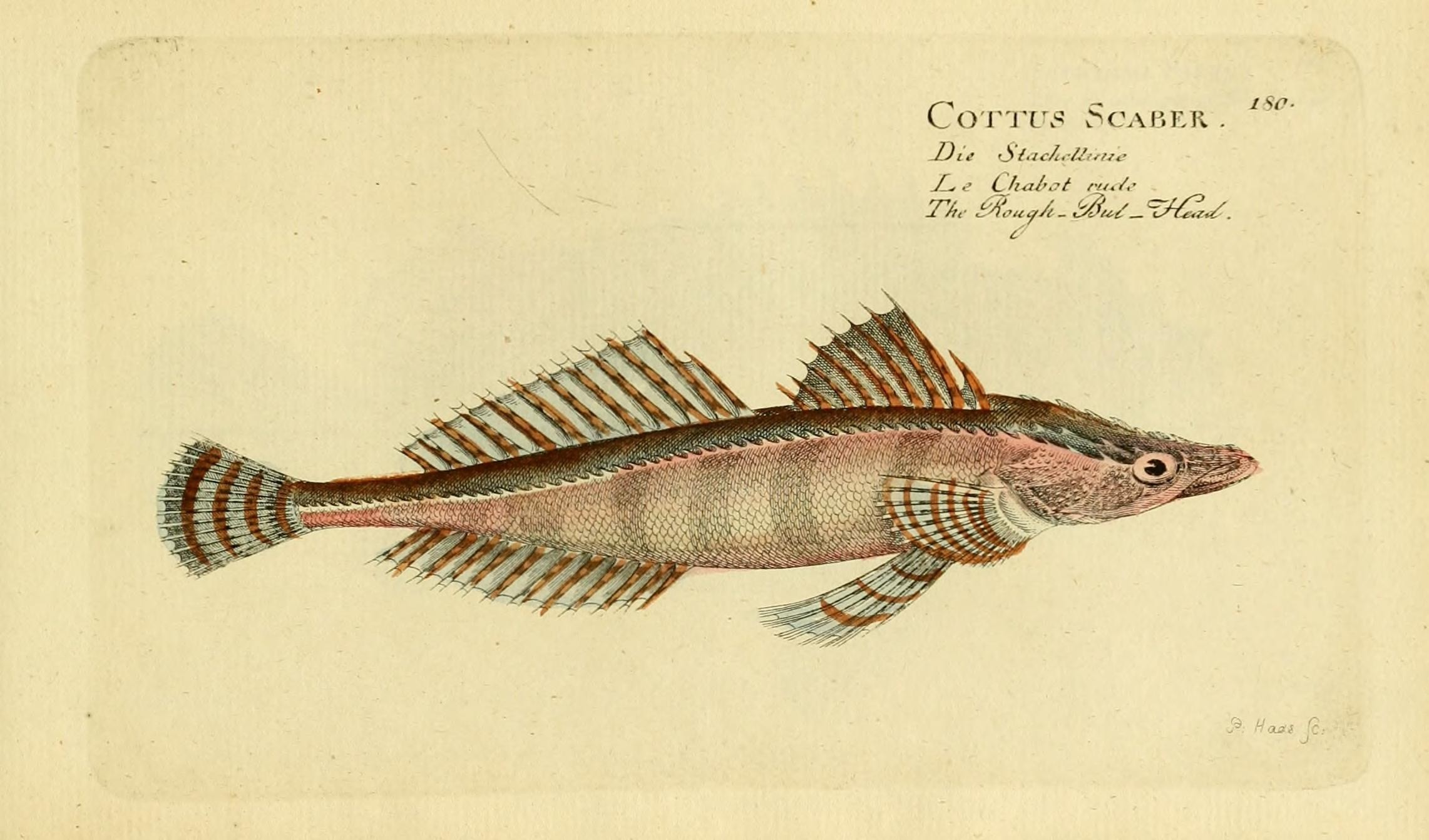
- Grammoplites scaber

Scientific classification
- Kingdom: Animalia
- Phylum: Chordata
- Class: Actinopterygii
- Order: Perciformes
- Family: Platycephalidae
- Genus: Grammoplites; Fowler, 1904

Type species
- Cottus scaber Linnaeus, 1758

= Grammoplites =

Genus of fishes

Grammoplites is a genus of marine ray-finned fishes belonging to the family Platycephalidae, the flatheads. These fishes are found in the Indo-Pacific region.

== Taxonomy ==
Grammoplites was first proposed as a genus in 1904 by the American zoologist Henry Weed Fowler, Fowler's genus was originally monotypic with Cottus scaber, described in 1758 by Linnaeus, designated as its type species. This genus is classified within the family Playtcephalidae, the flatheads which the 5th edition of Fishes of the World classifies within the suborder Platycephaloidei in the order Scorpaeniformes. The genus name Grammoplites is a combination of gramme, meaning "line", and hoplites, which means "armed", an allusion to the scaled spines on the lateral line of G. scaber.

== Species ==
Grammoplites contains 4 recognised species:

- Grammoplites knappi Imamura & Amaoka, 1994
- Grammoplites scaber Linnaeus, 1758 (Rough flathead)
- Grammoplites suppositus Troschel, 1840 (Spotfin flathead)
- Grammoplites vittatus Valenciennes, 1833

G. vittatus has been considered as a junior synonym of G. scaber but other authorities regard it as a valid species.

== Characteristics ==
Grammoplites flatheads have at least two spines on the preoperculum, with the upper spine being the longest. The caudal fin lacks any elongated filaments from the upper lobe. The first dorsal fin contains between 7 and 10 spines while the second dorsal fin has up to 12 soft rays. There are two separate patches of vomerine teeth.The lateral line has 48 to 56 pored scales, all of which bear a robust spine. The maximum total length attained by these fishes is around 30 cm (12 in).

== Distribution ==
Grammoplites flatheads are found in the Indo-West pacific region and are found from the southern Red Sea and the northern Indian Ocean east to the South China Sea.
