= Guinea flathead =

Conservation status
- Least Concern (IUCN 3.1)

Scientific classification
- Kingdom: Animalia
- Phylum: Chordata
- Class: Actinopterygii
- Order: Perciformes
- Family: Platycephalidae
- Genus: Solitas; Imamura, 1996
- Species: S. gruveli

Binomial name
- Solitas gruveli (Pellegrin, 1905)

Synonyms
- Platycephalus gruveli Pellegrin, 1905; Grammoplites gruveli (Pellegrin, 1905); Thysanophrys gruveli (Pellegrin, 1905)

Species of fish

The Guinea flathead (Solitas gruveli) is a species of marine ray-finned fish belonging to the family Platycephalidae, the flatheads. It is found in the eastern Atlantic Ocean along the western coast of Africa. This species is the only known member of the genus Solitas. It is also the only flathead species which has a natural distribution which lies outside of the Indo-Pacific.

== Taxonomy ==
The Guinea flathead was first formally described as Platycephalus gruveli in 1905 by the French zoologist Jacques Pellegrin with its type locality given as Guet N'Dar in Mauritania. In 1996 Hisashi Imamura classified the Guinea flathead within a new monotypic genus Solitas. This taxon is classified within the family Playtcephalidae, the flatheads which the 5th edition of Fishes of the World classifies within the suborder Platycephaloidei in the order Scorpaeniformes.

== Etymology ==
Solitas, the genus name, is derived from the Latin solitarius, meaning "alone", an allusion to this being the only flathead to have its range entirely outwith the Indo-West Pacific. The specific name honours the biologist Jean Abel Gruvel, the collector of the type specimen.

== Description ==
The Guinea flathead attains a maximum published total length of 20 cm (7.9 in), although 18 cm (7.1 in) is more typical.

== Distribution, habitat and biology ==
The Guinea flathead is found in the tropical eastern Atlantic Ocean from Mauritania south to Angola, including São Tomé e Principe. It is found at depths between 20 and 200 m (66 and 656 ft) in shallow coastal waters with sand and mud substrates, It feeds on fishes and crustaceans.

== Fisheries ==
The Guinea flathead is fished for mainly by bottom trawls. Te catch is mainly sold fresh and or as salted fish in local markets, it is also processed to make fish meal by offshore fleets.
