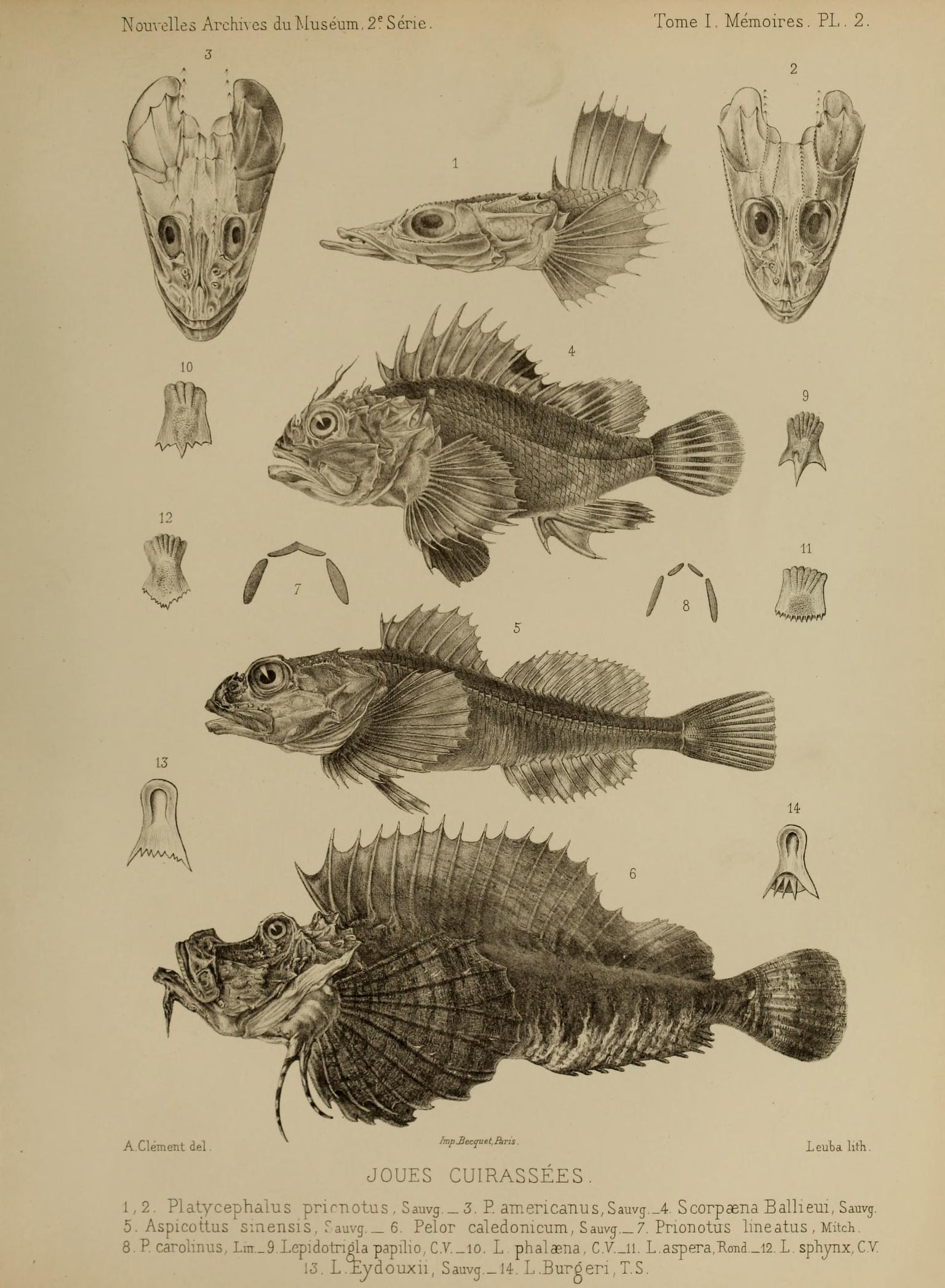
- 1. & 2. Sorsogona prionota syn. Platycephalus prionotus

Conservation status
- Least Concern (IUCN 3.1)

Scientific classification
- Kingdom: Animalia
- Phylum: Chordata
- Class: Actinopterygii
- Order: Perciformes
- Family: Platycephalidae
- Genus: Ratabulus
- Species: R. prionotus

Binomial name
- Ratabulus prionotus (Sauvage, 1873)

Synonyms
- Sorsogona prionota (Sauvage, 1873); Platycephalus prionotus Sauvage, 1873; Rogadius prionotus (Sauvage, 1873); Platycephalus subfasciatus Günther, 1887; Platycephalus townsendi Regan, 1905; Platycephalus heterolepis Barnard, 1927

= Halfspined flathead =

Species of fish

The halfspined flathead (Ratabulus prionotus) is a species of marine ray-finned fish belonging to the family Platycephalidae, the flatheads. This species is found in the western Indian Ocean and the Red Sea.

== Taxonomy ==
The halfspined flathead was first formally described as Platycephalus prionotus in 1873 by the French zoologist Henri Émile Sauvage with its type locality given as the Red Sea, or possibly Madagascar. There is some uncertainty about its classification as some authorities classify this species in the genus Sorsogona. Its specific name prionotus means "jagged" or "serrated", and may be an allusion to the fine serrations on the bony ridges over and under the eye.

== Description ==
The halfspined flathead has an elongated body with a flattened head with obvious ridges on the upper and lower parts of the operculum. There are three large and two small preopercular spines which are under half the length of the larger spines. The ridge above the eye is serrated and ends at a long spine on the preoperculum. The lower jaw protrudes and has a band of small teeth. The vomerine and palatine teeth are arranged in patches on either side of the roof of the mouth. The first dorsal fin has 9 spines and the second dorsal fin has 12 soft rays while the anal fin has 12 or 13 soft rays. This fish is brownish in colour marked with 4 or 5 transverse bands across the back. The first dorsal fin is dusky brown, the other fins have dark spots. The flap under the operculum is dark purple with light lines. This species attains a maximum published total length of 22 cm (8.7 in).

== Distribution and habitat ==
The halfspined flathead occurs from Maputo Bay north to the Red Sea and east to the Persian Gulf and Karachi. It has been recorded once in the Mediterranean Sea off Israel in 1947. This is a benthic species found on sand and mud substrates at depths of between 1 and 100 m (0 and 330 ft).

== Biology ==
The halfspined flathead is a predatory species which mainly eats fish.
