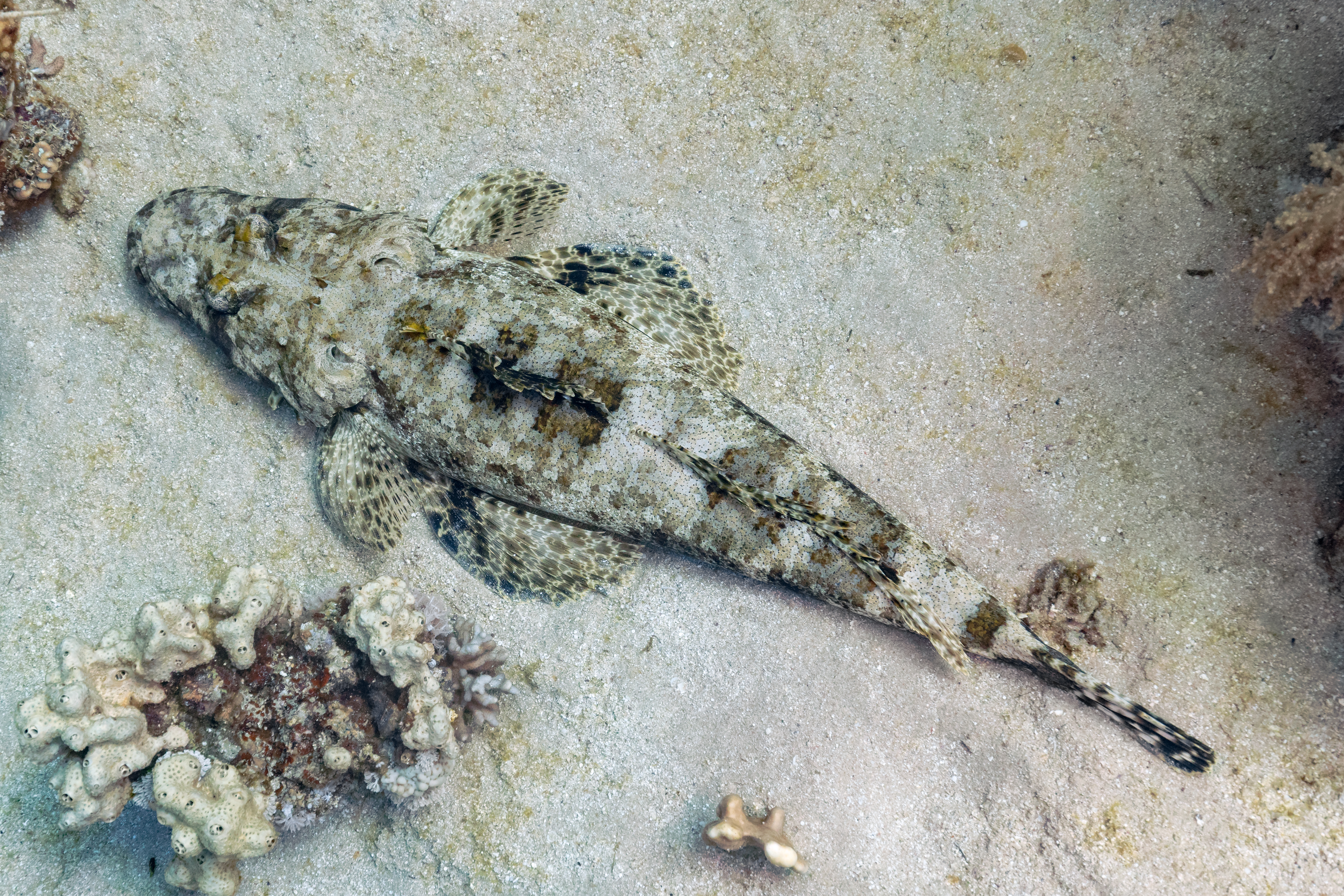

Conservation status
- Least Concern (IUCN 3.1)

Scientific classification
- Kingdom: Animalia
- Phylum: Chordata
- Class: Actinopterygii
- Order: Perciformes
- Family: Platycephalidae
- Genus: Papilloculiceps; Fowler & Steinitz, 1956
- Species: P. longiceps

Binomial name
- Papilloculiceps longiceps (G. Cuvier, 1829)

Synonyms
- Platycephalus longiceps Cuvier, 1829; Platycephalus tentaculatus Rüppell, 1838; Rogadius tentaculatus (Rüppell, 1838); Platycephalus grandidieri Sauvage, 1873; Papilloculiceps grandidieri (Sauvage, 1873); Platycephalus papilloculus Fowler, 1935

= Tentacled flathead =

Species of fish

The tentacled flathead (Papilloculiceps longiceps), also known as the Indian Ocean crocodilefish, Madagascar flathead or longhead flathead, is a species of marine ray-finned fish belonging to the family Platycephalidae, the flatheads. This species is in the western Indian Ocean, including the Red Sea and the Mediterranean, having invaded as a Lessepsian migrant through the Suez Canal. It is the only species in the monotypic genus Papilloculiceps.

== Taxonomy ==
The tentacled flathead was first formally described as Platycephalus longiceps by the French zoologist Georges Cuvier in 1829 from specimens collected by Ehrenberg at Massawa in Eritrea. In 1873 the French zoologist Henri Émile Sauvage described a new species Platycephalus grandidieri from Madagascar and in 1956 the American zoologist Henry Weed Fowler and the Israeli ichthyologist Heinz Steinitz proposed a new monotypic genus, Papilloculiceps, with Sauvage's Platycephalus grandidieri as its type species. P. grandidieri is now considered to be a junior synonym of Cuvier's P. longiceps. This genus is classified within the family Playtcephalidae, the flatheads which the 5th edition of Fishes of the World classifies within the suborder Platycephaloidei in the order Scorpaeniformes.

=== Etymology ===
The genus name Papilloculiceps is a combination of papilla ("nipple") and oculus ("eye"), a reference to the small and inconspicuous flattened papilla on the upper surface of the eyeball. The specific name means "long head" and may refer to the flattened, crocodile-like shape of the species' head.

== Description ==
The tentacled flathead has an elongate body with a depressed head with 5 prominent nuchal spines. The ridges on the preoperculum and operculum are smaller dorsally than they are ventrally. There is a spine on the rear of the suborbital ridge which ends with a small spine. There are small spines on the preoperculum. The supraorbital is smooth with a tiny terminal spine, there is one preocular and two parietal spines. The eyes have notable papillae on their upper surfaces. The first dorsal fin has 9 spines and the second dorsal fin and the anal fin each have 11 soft rays. The maximum published total length for this species is 70 cm (28 in), although 50 cm (20 in) is more typical. The body is mottled brownish or greenish dorsally, whitish ventrally. There are 3 or 4 dark bands on the caudal fin and the other fins are marked with large, dark blotches.

== Distribution and habitat ==
The tentacled flathead is found in the western Indian Ocean from northern KwaZulu-Natal and Madagascar to the northern Red Sea. It also occurs in the Mediterranean Sea, having first been reported there off the coast of Israel in 1986, probably having migrated through the Suez Canal. This species occurs near coral reefs on sand or rubble substrates at depths between 1 and 15 m (3 ft 3 in and 49 ft 3 in).

== Biology ==
The tentacled flathead is a well camouflaged, ambush predator of fish and crustaceans.

== Gallery ==
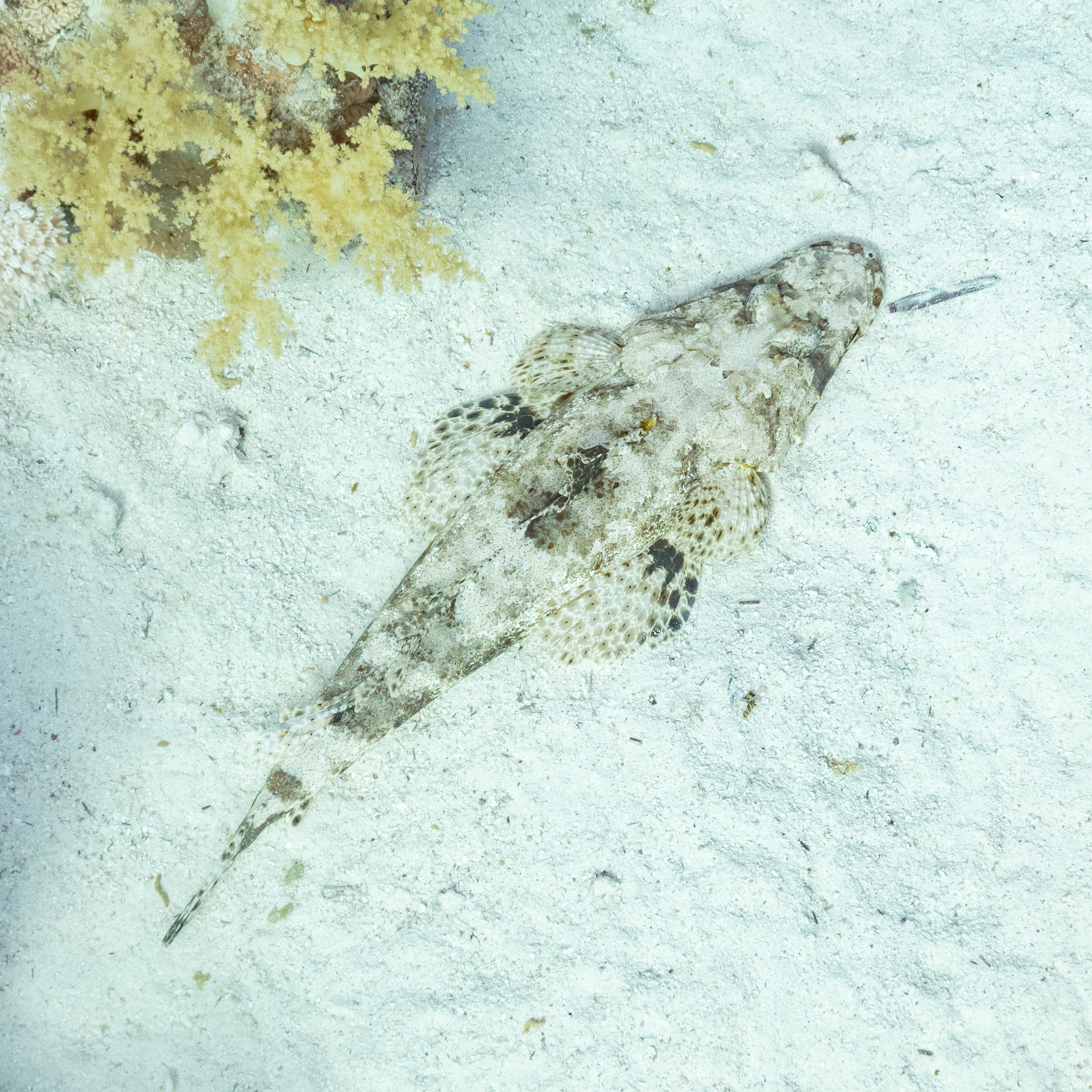
Crocodile fish at 20m Ras Muhammad, Red Sea

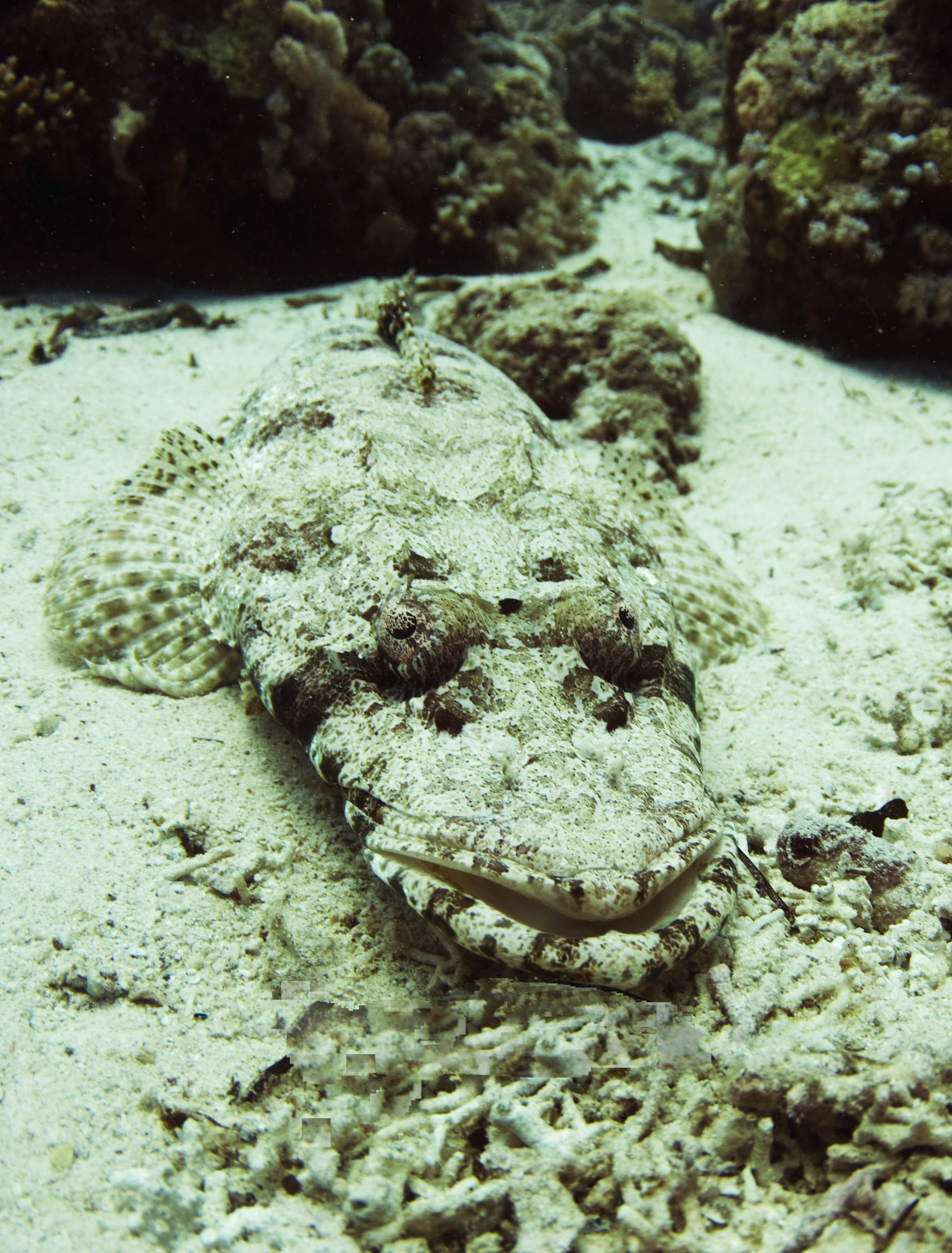
Papilloculiceps longiceps and Cymbacephalus beauforti are the two species of the family Platycephalidae which resemble crocodiles most.

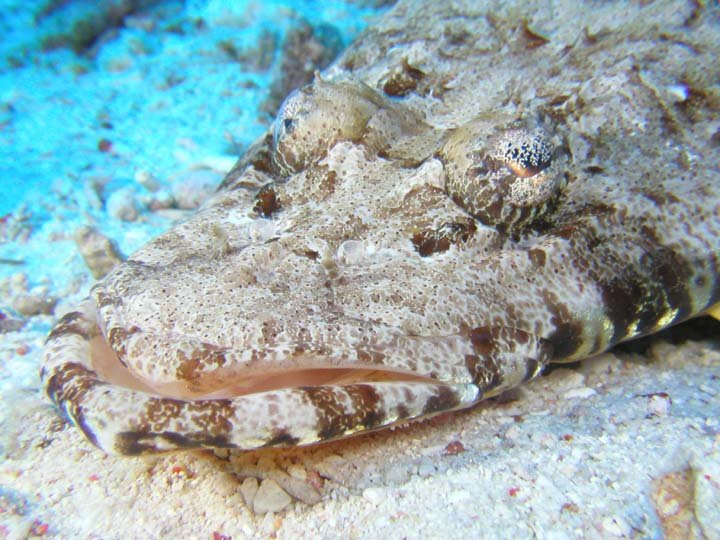
Detail of lappets over eyes

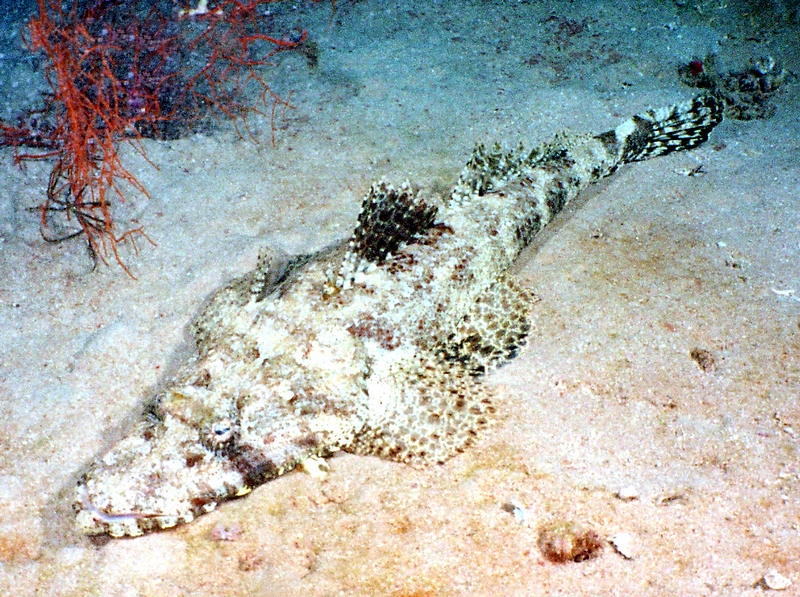
True colouration
