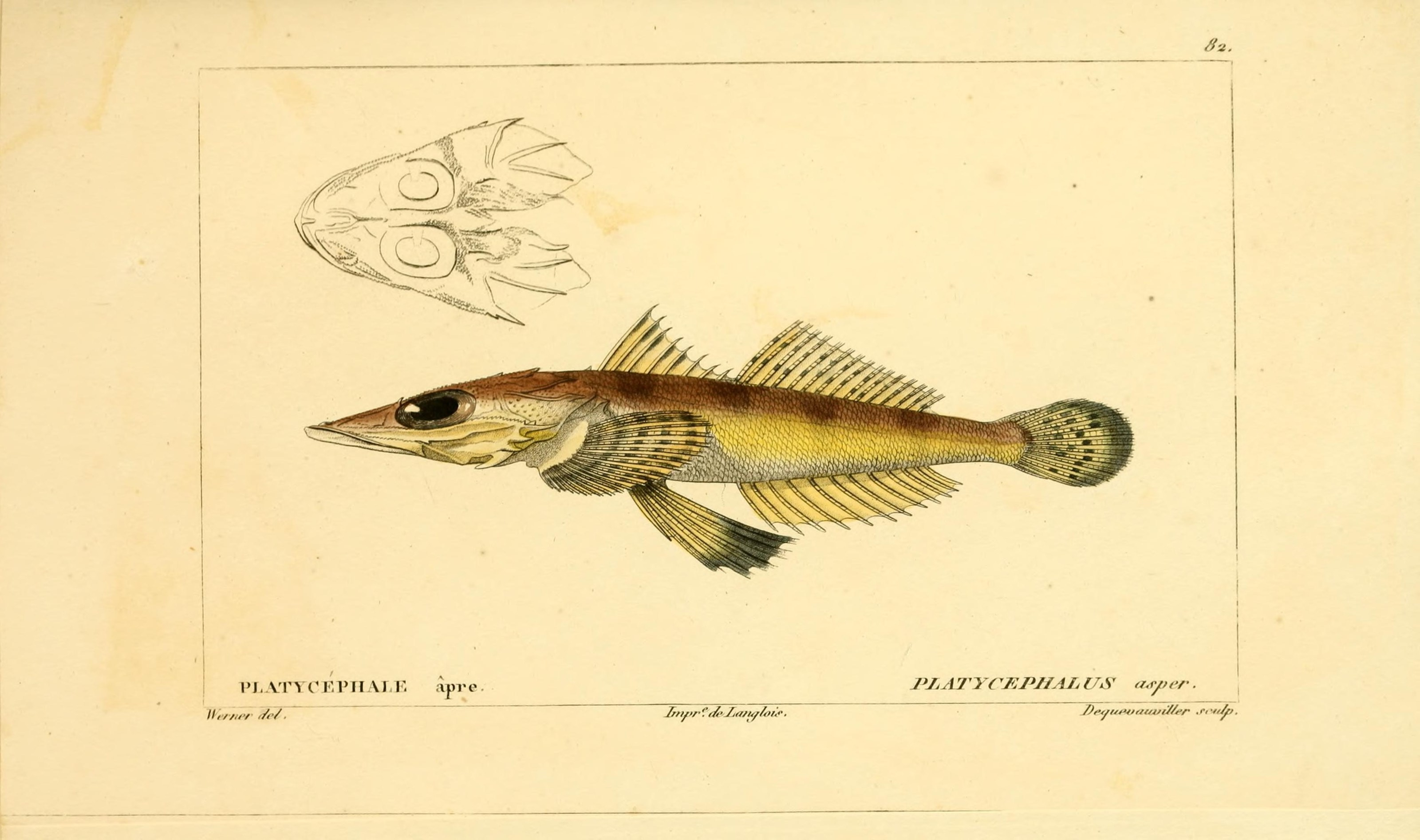
- Rogadius asper syn. Platycephalus asper

Scientific classification
- Kingdom: Animalia
- Phylum: Chordata
- Class: Actinopterygii
- Order: Perciformes
- Family: Platycephalidae
- Genus: Rogadius; D. S. Jordan & R. E. Richardson, 1908

Type species
- Platycephalus asper Cuvier, 1829

= Rogadius =

Genus of fishes

Rogadius is a genus of marine, demersal ray-finned fish belonging to the family Platycephalidae. These fishes are native to the Indian Ocean and the western Pacific Ocean.

== Taxonomy ==
Rogadius was first formally proposed as a genus in 1908 by the American ichthyologists David Starr Jordan and Robert Earl Richardson with Platycephalus asper, which had been described in 1829 by Georges Cuvier from Nagasaki, designated as its type species. This genus is classified within the family Playtcephalidae, the flatheads which the 5th edition of Fishes of the World classifies within the suborder Platycephaloidei in the order Scorpaeniformes.

== Etymology ==
Rogadius is a latinisation of rogad, an Arabic name for the bartail flathead (Platycephalus indicus).

== Species ==
Rogadius contains eight species:

- Rogadius asper (Cuvier, 1829) (Olive-tailed flathead)
- Rogadius fehlmanni L. W. Knapp, 2012
- Rogadius mcgroutheri Imamura, 2007 (McGrouther's flathead)
- Rogadius patriciae L. W. Knapp, 1987 (Black-banded flathead)
- Rogadius pristiger (Cuvier, 1829) (Thorny flathead)
- Rogadius serratus (Cuvier, 1829) (Serrated flathead)
- Rogadius welanderi (L. P. Schultz, 1966) (Welander's flathead)
- Rogadius azizahae (Nurul Aimi, 2025) (Azizah's flathead)

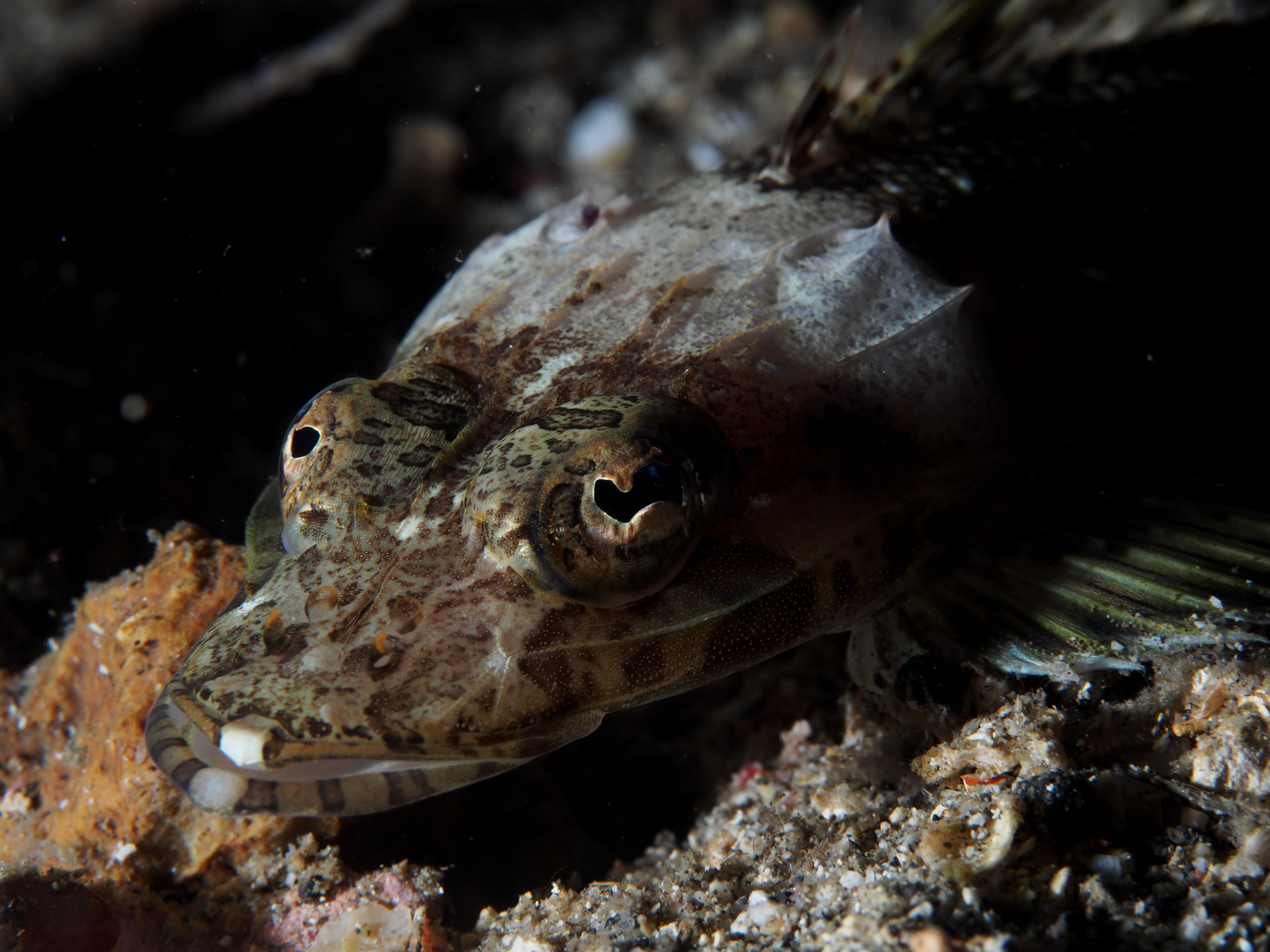
Serrated flathead (Rogadius serratus)

== Characteristics ==
Rogadius flatheads have two or more preopercular spines have at least two spines on the preoperculum, with the upper spine being the longest. There is no elongation of the upper lobe of the caudal fin with no elongated filament extending out from that fin. The first dorsal fin has between eight or nine spines. the second being equal in height to the third, while the second dorsal fin has no more than twelve soft rays. There are two separate patches of vomerine teeth. There are between 48 and 56 pored scales, each with two pores, on the lateral line with spines on the scales in the anterior portion of that line. The diagonal rows of scales run downwards and backwards over lateral line and the number of these rows is roughly about equal to the number of scales in the lateral line, typically with a difference of only one or two scales. The head has bony ridges which have many fine serrations on them and a single bony ridge on the side of the head underneath the eye with the lower margin of the suborbital not being clearly visible due to being turned inward. The lappet on the iris has two lobes. The maximum length attained by these fishes varies from a standard length of 11.2 cm (4.4 in) in R. fehlmanni to a maximum total length of 50 cm (20 in) in R. pristiger.

== Distribution ==
Rogadius flatheads are found in the Indian and Western Pacific Oceans from the Red Sea to Tonga, north to southern Japan and south to Australia.
