= Spiny flathead =

Conservation status
- Least Concern (IUCN 3.1)

Scientific classification
- Kingdom: Animalia
- Phylum: Chordata
- Class: Actinopterygii
- Order: Perciformes
- Family: Platycephalidae
- Genus: Kumococius; Matsubara & Ochiai, 1955
- Species: K. rodericensis

Binomial name
- Kumococius rodericensis (G. Cuvier, 1829)

Synonyms
- Platycephalus rodericensis Cuvier, 1829; Suggrundus rodericensis (Cuvier, 1829); Platycephalus timoriensis Cuvier, 1829; Platycephalus sculptus Günther, 1880; Suggrundus sculptus (Günther, 1880); Insidiator detrusus D. S. Jordan & Seale, 1905; Kumococius detrusus (Jordan & Seale, 1905); Platycephalus bengalensis Rao, 1966; Suggrundus bengalensis (Rao, 1966)

Species of fish

The spiny flathead (Kumococius rodericensis), also known as the whitefin flathead or Bengal flathead, is a species of marine ray-finned fish belonging to the family Platycephalidae, the flatheads. It is found in the Indo-West Pacific region. This species is the only known member of its genus.

== Taxonomy ==
The spiny flathead was first formally described as Platycephalus rodericensis in 1829 by the French zoologist Georges Cuvier with its type locality given as Réunion. In 1905 the American ichthyologists David Starr Jordan and Alvin Seale described a new species of flathead from Hong Kong, Insidiator detrusus, and in 1955 the Japanese ichthyologists Kiyomatsu Matsubara and Akira Ochiai placed this taxon in a new monotypic genus, Kumococia. Subsequently, Jordan and Seale's taxon has been recognised as a junior synonym of Cuvier's Platycephalus rodericensis although the genus Kumococia is still regarded as valid. This genus is classified within the family Playtcephalidae, the flatheads which the 5th edition of Fishes of the World classifies within the suborder Platycephaloidei in the order Scorpaeniformes. The genus name Kumocius is a latinisation of kumogochi, which translates as "cloud flathead", and is the Japanese name for this species and gochi or kochi is the name in Japanese for flatheads and dragonets. The specific name means "of Rodrigues", Rodrigues being an island in the Mascarenes, although Cuvier listed the type locality as being Réunion. another of the Mascarene Islands.

== Description ==
The spiny flathead has an elongate, moderately flattened body with a large head, which can be a third of its standard length which is also flattened and which has a number of low, mainly spiny ridges. There is no ocular flap. The jaws are equipped with villiform teeth and there are two patches of vomerine teeth with thin tooth bands on the palatines. The preoperculum has three spines at its angle with the top spine being the longest and extends to or past the margin of the operculum and there is an accessory spine. This species has an obvious interopercular flap. The first dorsal fin contains 9 spines and has base almost the same length as that of the second dorsal fin. The first dorsal spine is very short and is joined to the second spine by a low membrane, and the following spines are much longer. The second dorsal fin has moderately long base and contains11 or 12 soft rays with the longest rays towards the front. The anal fin contains between 11 and 13 soft rays and has a similar shape to the second dorsal fin, is opposite it but has a slightly longer-base. The upper part of the caudal fin is truncate and the lower is rounded. The maximum published total length for this species is 25 cm (9.8 in). although 17 cm (6.7 in) is more typical. This is a sandy or brownish fish, densely marked with small black spots and having 5 or so vague wide dark bands over the back and typically having a black spot on the first dorsal fin. The pectoral fins are dark brown with a pale centre. The pelvic fins are dark with a pale margin and the caudal fin is dusky with pale blotch close it its base.

== Distribution and habitat ==
The spiny flathead has a wide range in the Indo-West Pacific. It can be found from the Persian Gulf and Gulf of Oman south to the western Mascarenes and east to the Philippines, north to southern Japan, and south to northern Australia. In Australia it ranges from off Barrow Island in Western Australia to off Bowen, Queensland. It can be found at depths between 6 and 75 m (20 and 246 ft), on sandy or muddy substrates on the continental shelf.

== Biology ==
The spiny flathead is a protandrous hermaphrodite, the mature males change sex into females. There is external fertilisation of eggs and the eggs are broadcast, although they are embedded within a large, floating, gelatinous matrix.

== Fisheries ==
Spiny flatheads are taken by trawl fisheries but often as bycatch.
