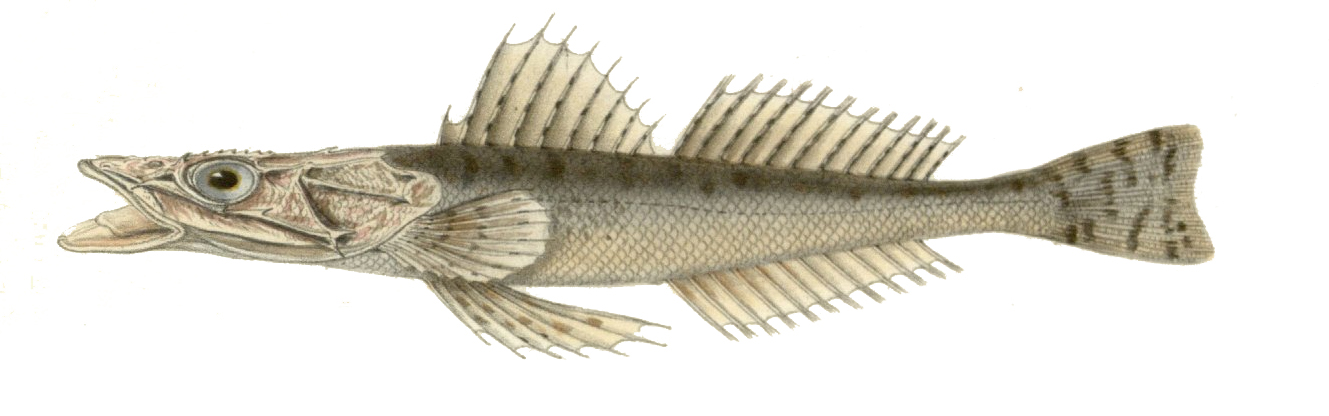

Conservation status
- Least Concern (IUCN 3.1)

Scientific classification
- Kingdom: Animalia
- Phylum: Chordata
- Class: Actinopterygii
- Order: Perciformes
- Family: Platycephalidae
- Genus: Inegocia
- Species: I. japonica

Binomial name
- Inegocia japonica Cuvier, 1829

Synonyms
- Platycephalus japonicus Cuvier, 1829; Silurus inermis Houttuyn, 1782; Silurus imberbis Gmelin, 1789; Platycephalus japonicus Tilesius, 1814; Inegocia japonica (Tilesius, 1814); Platycephalus borboniensis Cuvier, 1829; Platycephalus isacanthus Cuvier, 1829; Inegocia isacanthus (Cuvier, 1829); Suggrundus isacanthus (Cuvier, 1829); Platycephalus bataviensis Bleeker, 1853

= Inegocia japonica =

Species of fish

Inegocia japonica, the Japanese flathead, rusty flathead or smooth flathead, is a species of marine ray-finned fish belonging to the family Platycephalidae, the flatheads. It is found in the Indo-West Pacific region.

== Taxonomy ==
Inegocia japonica was first formally described as Platycephalus japonicus in 1829 by the French zoologist Georges Cuvier, no type locality was given but it is almost certainly Nagasaki. Platycephalus japonicus had been coined in 18414 by the German naturalist Tilesius but Tilesius had published the name in Cyrillic script and the International Code of Zoological Nomenclature requires names be published in Latin script to be valid, leading to the name being attributed to Cuvier. Cuvier also named Platycephalus borboniensis and Platycephalus isacanthus in the same publication as Platycephalus japonicus but in 2009 Hisashi Inamura and Tetsuo Yoshino acted as the first revisers to establish the precedence of Platycephalus japonicus. In addition, in 2011 Imamura and Nagao proposed the suppression of Silurus imberbis. a name put forward by Johann Friedrich Gmelin in 1789 by "reversal of precedence" in favour of the well-known and established Inegocia japonica and in 2013 Maurice Kottelat declared this name was a nomen oblitum. When David Starr Jordan and John Otterbein Snyder were proposing the genus Inegocia they designated Tilesius's Platycephalus japonicus as the type species of the genus. The specific name means "Japanese".

== Description ==
Inegocia japonica has 9 spines in the first dorsal fin, the first, very short spine may be detached or be connected to the second spine by a membrane. The second dorsal fin has between 11 and 13, typically 12, soft rays, as does the anal fin. It has an elongated an moderately flattened body with a large, flattened head with the supraorbital ridge being smooth to its front and serrate over the rear of the eye. The is no preorbital spine, there is a single preocular spine and the suborbital ridge is smooth apart from 2 spines under the eye. Specimens from the southern parts of the range may show a few additional small serrations on the suborbital ridge. There are typically 3 spines on the preoperculum spines with the upper spine being short not too different in size from the lower spine. There is a long flap between the eyes. The caudal fin is rounded. The overall colour ranges from orange to brown marked with flecks or mottles, with a pale belly, and with numerous variable sized dark spots on the caudal fin. The maximum published total length of this species is 35 cm (14 in), although 20 cm (7.9 in) is more typical.

== Distribution and habitat ==
Inegocia japonica has a wide Indo-West Pacific distribution. It ranges from Sri Lanka and India east to the Philippines and Papua New Guinea, north to southern Japan; south to Australia from Cockburn Sound, Western Australia to Moreton Bay, Queensland. There is a record from Réunion, the holotype of Platycephalus borboniensis, however, this appears to be erroneous. This is a demersal species found on sandy and muddy substrates in bays and coastal waters at depths between 5 and 85 m (16 and 279 ft).

== Biology ==
Inegocia japonica is thought to feed largely on other fishes. This species is a protandrous hermaphrodite, the larger males change sex to become female. They are reported to have overlapping home ranges and a promiscuous mating system.

== Fisheries ==
Inegocia japonica is tajken as bycatch in trawl fisheries.
