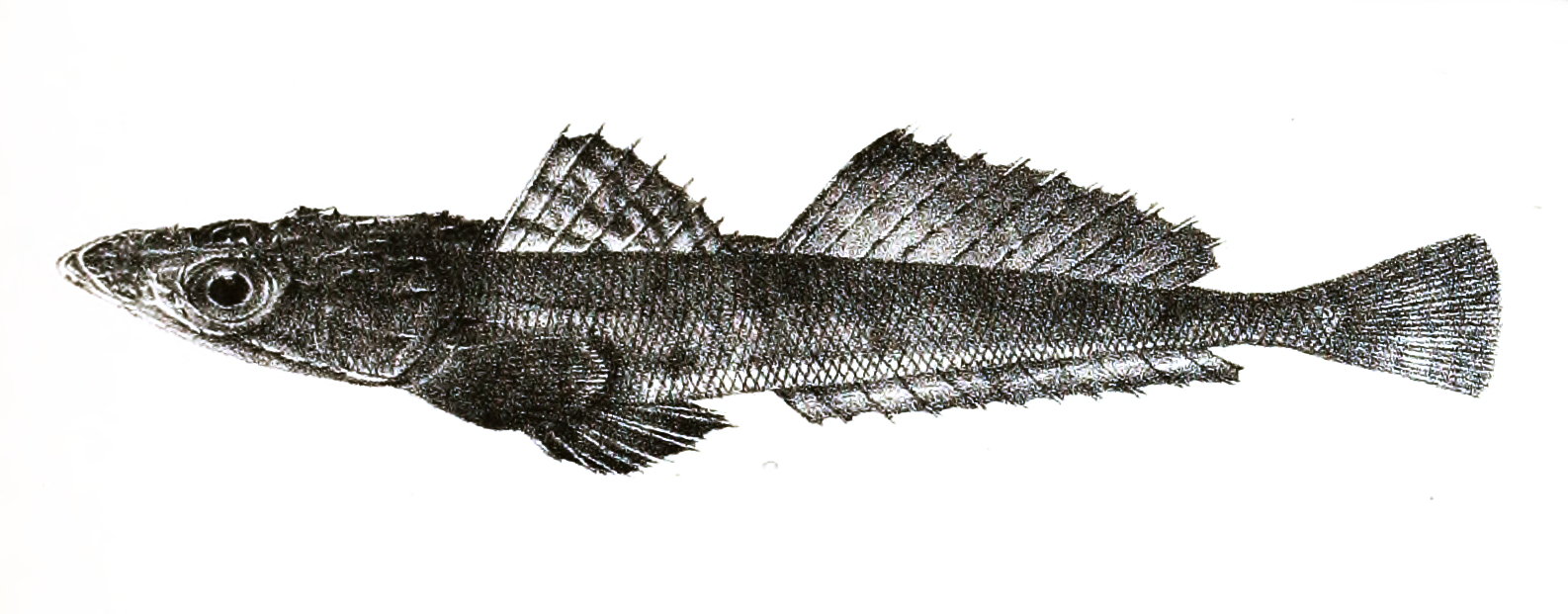
- Insidiator macracanthus syn. Platycephalus macracanthus

Scientific classification
- Kingdom: Animalia
- Phylum: Chordata
- Class: Actinopterygii
- Order: Perciformes
- Family: Platycephalidae
- Genus: Insidiator; D. S. Jordan [D. S.] & Snyder, 1900

Type species
- Platycephalus rudis, a synonym of Insidiator meerdervoortii Günther, 1877

Synonyms
- Suggrundus Whitley, 1930; Repotrudis Whitley, 1930; Seychelliceps Prokofiev, 2019

= Insidiator =

Genus of fishes

Insidiator is a genus of marine, demersal ray-finned fish belonging to the family Platycephalidae. These fishes are native to the eastern Indian Ocean and western Pacific Ocean.

== Taxonomy ==
Insidiator was first proposed as a monotypic genus in 1900 by the American ichthyologists David Starr Jordan and John Otterbein Snyder with Platycephalus rudis, which had been described in 1877 from Yokohama in Japan, designated as its type species. In 1930 the Australian ichthyologist Gilbert Percy Whitley proposed the replacement name Suggrundus for this genus because he thought Jordan and Snyder's name was preoccupied by Insidiator Oken 1842 or by Insidiator Amyot 1845 but these names were objectively invalid and the original name is valid and Suggrundus is a junior synonym of Insidiator D. S. Jordan & Snyder 1900. This genus is classified within the family Playtcephalidae, the flatheads which the 5th edition of Fishes of the World classifies within the suborder Platycephaloidei in the order Scorpaeniformes.

== Etymology ==
Insidiator means "ambusher" or "lurker", an allusion Jordan and Snyder did not explain, it may refer to the ambush predatory behaviour of the flatheads, in which they hide in the sediment with only the eyes showing, and striking suddenly at passing prey which is swallowed whole by their large mouths. Jordan and Snyder may have taken inspiration for this name from Forsskål's Cottus insidiator, a junior synonym of the bartail flathead (Platycephalus indicus).

== Species ==
Insidiator currently contains 3 valid species:

- Insidiator cooperi (Regan, 1908)
- Insidiator macracanthus (Bleeker, 1869) (Large-spined flathead)
- Insidiator meerdervoortii (Bleeker, 1860)

== Characteristics ==
Insidiator flatheads have at least 2 spines on the preoperculum, with the upper spine being the longest, bayonet like and extending past the margin of the operculum. There is no elongation of the upper lobe of the caudal fin with no elongated filament extending out from that fin. The first dorsal fin has between 8 or 9 spines. the second being equal in height to the third, while the second dorsal fin has no more than 12 soft rays. There are 2 separate patches of vomerine teeth. There are between 48 and 56 pored scales, each with 2 pores, on the lateral line with spines on the scales in the anterior portion of that line. The diagonal rows of scales run downwards and backwards over lateral line and the number of these rows is roughly about equal to the number of scales in the lateral line, typically with a difference of only 1 or 2 scales. The margin of the pectoral fin is not curved. The bony ridges on the head have a few larger spines and the side of head below the eye has two ridges. The lappet on the iris is either branched with short branches or crenulated. There is a single preocular spine which can have a cluster of smaller spines around its base. The upper preopercular spine bayonet-like, reaching to or past opercular margin. The maximum length attained by these fishes varies from a standard length of 16.4 cm (6.5 in) in I. meerdervoortii to a total length of 30 cm (12 in) in I. cooperi.

== Distribution and habitat ==
Insidiator flatfishes are found in the Indo-West Pacific from the Seychelles east to the Coral Sea, south to Australia and north to Japan. They are demersal fish found at depths down to 132 m (433 ft).
