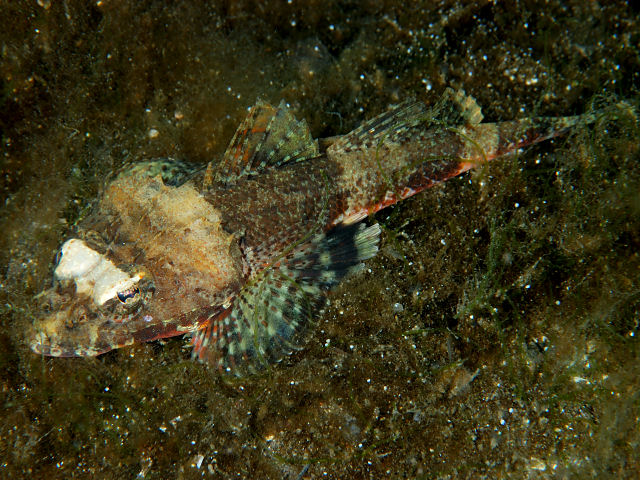
- Onigocia spinosa

Scientific classification
- Kingdom: Animalia
- Phylum: Chordata
- Class: Actinopterygii
- Order: Perciformes
- Family: Platycephalidae
- Genus: Onigocia; D. S. Jordan & W. F. Thompson, 1913

Type species
- Platycephalus macrolepis Bleeker, 1854

Synonyms
- Wakiyus D. S. Jordan & Hubbs, 1925

= Onigocia =

Genus of fishes

Onigocia is a genus of marine ray-finned fishes belonging to the family Platycephalidae, the flatheads. They are found in the Indo-Pacific region.

== Taxonomy ==
Onigoia was first proposed as a genus in 1913 by the American ichthyologists David Starr Jordan and William Francis Thompson with Platycephalus macrolepis, which had been described in 1925 by Pieter Bleeker from Nagasaki, as its type species. This genus is classified within the family Playtcephalidae, the flatheads which the 5th edition of Fishes of the World classifies within the suborder Platycephaloidei in the order Scorpaeniformes. The genus name Onigocia is a latinisation of onigogochi which translates as "devil flathead" the Japanese common name for O. spinosa. Gochi, which is also spelled kochi, is a general name in Japanese for flatheads and dragonets.

== Species ==
There are currently 9 recognized species in this genus:

Image	Scientific name	Common name	Distribution
	Onigocia bimaculata L. W. Knapp, Imamura & Sakashita, 2000	Two-spotted flathead	Indo-Pacific: Known from the Gulf of Aqaba, Comoro Islands and Mauritius to southern Japan, the Philippines, Caroline Islands, northeastern Australia, New Caledonia, Fiji, Tonga, American Samoa and the Society Islands.
	Onigocia grandisquama (Regan, 1908)		Indo-West Pacific: Amirante Islands (Seychelles) and the Gulf of Thailand.
	Onigocia lacrimalis Imamura & L. W. Knapp, 2009	Smooth-snout flathead	Pacific South West: currently known only from the Chesterfield Islands, Coral Sea, and northern Norfolk Ridge, Tasman Sea.
	Onigocia macrocephala (M. C. W. Weber, 1913)	Southern notched flathead	In Australia, recorded from about Exmouth (Western Australia) to the English Company Islands (Northern Territory). Elsewhere in the South China Sea - Vietnam, The Philippines, China, north of Waigeo, the Bali Sea and the Timor Sea.
	Onigocia macrolepis (Bleeker, 1854)	Notched flathead	Indo-West Pacific: southern Japan, South China Sea, Philippines, Indonesia, northwest shelf of Australia and Andaman Sea.
	Onigocia oligolepis (Regan, 1908)	Large-scale flathead	Indo-West Pacific: three known specimens from Natal, South Africa; also from north and northwestern Australia, and possibly extending to western Papua New Guinea. Reported from Samoa
	Onigocia pedimacula (Regan, 1908)	Broad-band flathead	Indo-West Pacific: widespread, from off Natal, South Africa to Karachi, Maldives, South China Sea, Philippines, Irian Barat (Teluk Berau), Northwest Shelf of Australia, Timor and Arafura seas, Great Barrier Reef, Guadalcanal and Tonga.
	Onigocia sibogae Imamura, 2011		Indo-West Pacific: . Known from the Ceram, Arafura, Timor and Coral seas.
	Onigocia spinosa (Temminck & Schlegel, 1843)	Midget flathead	Western Pacific: southern Japan, South China Sea, Philippines, northwest shelf of Australia through Timor and Arafura seas.

== Characteristics ==
Onigocia is distinguished from other flathead genera by having finely serrated suborbital ridges and in the typically having less than 40 pored scales in the lateral line. These are small flatheads with the largest species being the midget flathead (O. spinosa), with a maximum published total length of 25 cm (9.8 in), while the smallest is O. grandisquama, which has a maximum published standard length of 6.2 cm (2.4 in).
