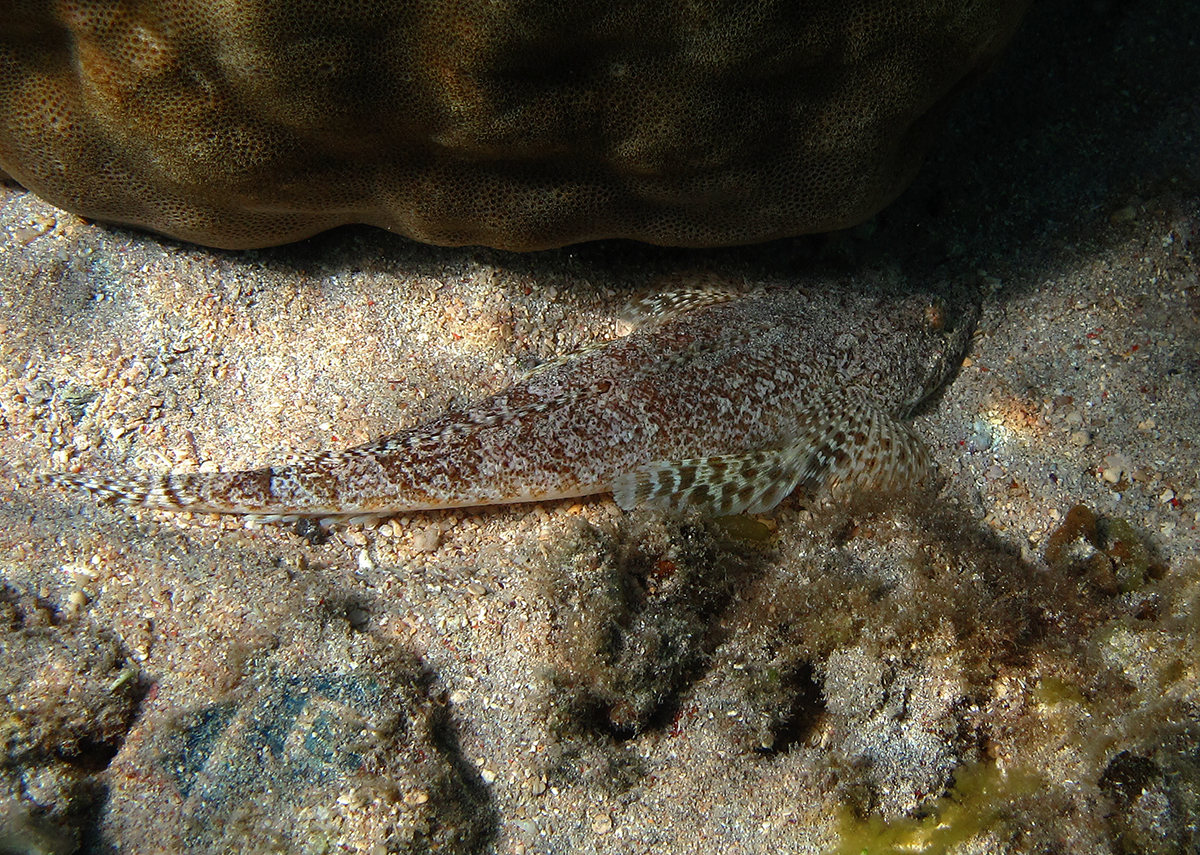
- Sunagocia arenicola

Scientific classification
- Kingdom: Animalia
- Phylum: Chordata
- Class: Actinopterygii
- Order: Perciformes
- Family: Platycephalidae
- Genus: Sunagocia; Imamura, 2003

Type species
- Thysanophrys arenicola Schultz, 1966

Synonyms
- Eurycephalus Imamura, 1996 (preoccupied)

= Sunagocia =

Genus of fishes

Sunagocia is a genus of marine, demersal ray-finned fish belonging to the family Platycephalidae. These fishes are native to the Indian and Pacific oceans.

== Taxonomy ==
Sunagocia was first proposed as a genus in 1996 as Eurycephalus by the Japanese ichthyologist Hisashi Imamura, with Thysanophrys arenicola, which had been described by Leonard Peter Schultz from Naen Island, Rongelap Atoll in 1966, as its type species. In 2003 Imamura renamed the genus Sunagocia because Eurycephalusis preoccupied as a synonym of the longhorn beetle genus Tapeina. This genus is classified within the family Playtcephalidae, the flatheads which the 5th edition of Fishes of the World classifies within the suborder Platycephaloidei in the order Scorpaeniformes.

== Etymology ==
Sunagocia is a latinisation of sunagochi the Japanese common name for S. arenicola. Gochi, which is also spelled kochi, is a general name in Japanese for flatheads and dragonets.

== Species ==
There are currently five recognized species in this genus:

- Sunagocia arenicola (Schultz, 1966) (Broadhead flathead)
- Sunagocia carbunculus (Valenciennes, 1833) (Papillose flathead)
- Sunagocia omanensis L. W. Knapp & J. E. Randall, 2013
- Sunagocia otaitensis (Cuvier, 1829) (Fringelip flathead)
- Sunagocia sainsburyi L. W. Knapp & Imamura, 2004 (Sainsbury's flathead)

== Characteritics ==
Sunagocia flatheads have lateral lines which typically have a scale count of 50-55, always less than 60 and the number of oblique scale rows which slant towards the tail from the back above the lateral line are roughly equal in number to the number of lateral line scales. The lateral line scales have two pores. The upper part of the head is spines but has no tubercles. The suborbital ridge normally has four clear spines in adults, less in younger fish. The lappet on the iris may be weakly or clearly branched. There are poorly developed sensory tubes partially covering the cheeks. The maximum publishedlength attained by these fishes varies from a standard length of 9.7 cm (3.8 in) in S. sainsburyi to a maximum total length of 40 cm (16 in) in R. carbunculus.

== Distribution ==
Sunagocia flatheads are found in the Indo-Pacific where they occur from eastern Africa east to the Marshall Islands and Fiji, north to Taiwan and the Ryukyu Islands and south to northern Australia.
