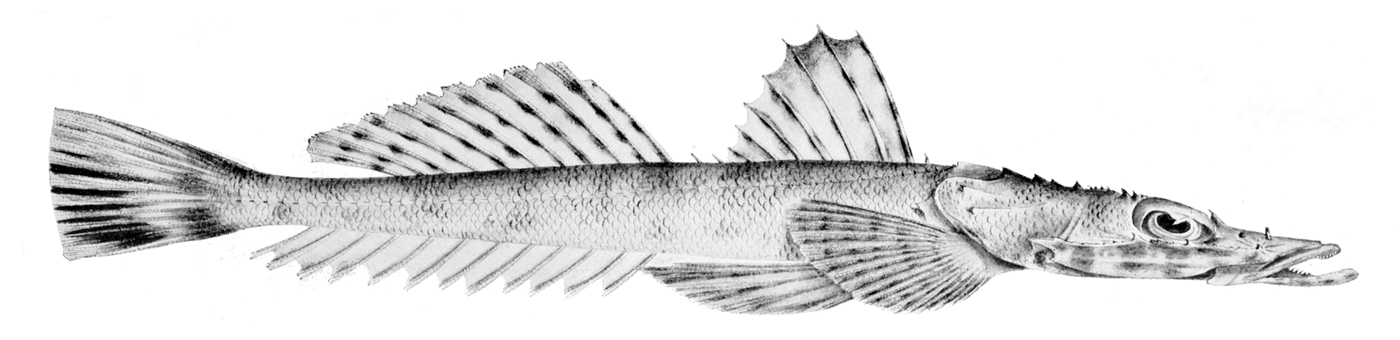
- Freespine Flathead (R. diversidens)

Scientific classification
- Kingdom: Animalia
- Phylum: Chordata
- Class: Actinopterygii
- Order: Perciformes
- Family: Platycephalidae
- Genus: Ratabulus; D. S. Jordan & C. L. Hubbs, 1925

Type species
- Thysanophrys megacephalus S. Tanaka, 1917

Synonyms
- Sorsogona Herre, 1934

= Ratabulus =

Genus of fishes

Ratabulus is a genus of marine, demersal ray-finned fish belonging to the family Platycephalidae. These fishes are native to the eastern Indian Ocean and the western Pacific Ocean.

== Taxonomy ==
Ratabulus was first formally proposed as a monotypic genus in 1924 by the American ichthyologists David Starr Jordan and Carl Leavitt Hubbs with Thysanophrys megacephalus, which had been described in 1917 by Shigeho Tanaka from a type specimen obtained at a fish market in Tokyo, designated as its type species. This genus is classified within the family Playtcephalidae, the flatheads which the 5th edition of Fishes of the World classifies within the suborder Platycephaloidei in the order Scorpaeniformes.

== Etymology ==
Ratabulus did not have its etymology explained by Jordan and Hubbs, however, the name was also spelled as Rutabulus by them, likely to derive from rutabulum, which is a Latin word meaning shovel, an allusion to the shovel-nosed head of R. megacephalus.

== Species ==
Ratabulus contains 10 species:

- Ratabulus diversidens (McCulloch, 1914)
- Ratabulus fulviguttatus Imamura & M. F. Gomon, 2010
- Ratabulus humerosus (L. W. Knapp & Heemstra 2011)
- Ratabulus megacephalus (S. Tanaka, 1917)
- Ratabulus melanopterus (Knapp & Wongratana 1987)
- Ratabulus nigripinnis (Regan 1905)
- Ratabulus portuguesus (J. L. B. Smith 1953)
- Ratabulus prionotus (Sauvage 1873)
- Ratabulus tuberculatus (Cuvier 1829)
- Ratabulus ventralis Imamura & M. F. Gomon, 2010

== Characteristics ==
Ratabulus flatheads have two or more preopercular spines have at least 2 spines on the preoperculum, with the upper spine being the longest. There is no elongation of the upper lobe of the caudal fin with no elongated filament extending out from that fin. The first dorsal fin has between 8 or 9 spines. the second being equal in height to the third, while the second dorsal fin has no more than 12 soft rays. There are 2 separate patches of vomerine teeth. There are between 48 and 56 pored scales, each with 2 pores, on the lateral line with spines on the scales in the anterior portion of that line. The diagonal rows of scales run downwards and backwards over lateral line and the number of these rows is roughly about equal to the number of scales in the lateral line, typically with a difference of only 1 or 2 scales. The canine-like teeth in the jaws are depressible. There are 3 or more spines below the eye on a suborbital ridge and the lappet on the iris is pointed. The maximum length attained by these fishes varies from a standard length of 12.5 cm (4.9 in) in R. humerosus to 39.1 cm (15.4 in) in R. diversidens.

== Distribution ==
Ratabulus flatheads are found in the far east of the Indian Ocean and the western Pacific Ocean. One species, R. prionotus, has moved through the Suez Canal to be recorded as a Lessepsian migrant in the eastern Mediterranean Sea.
