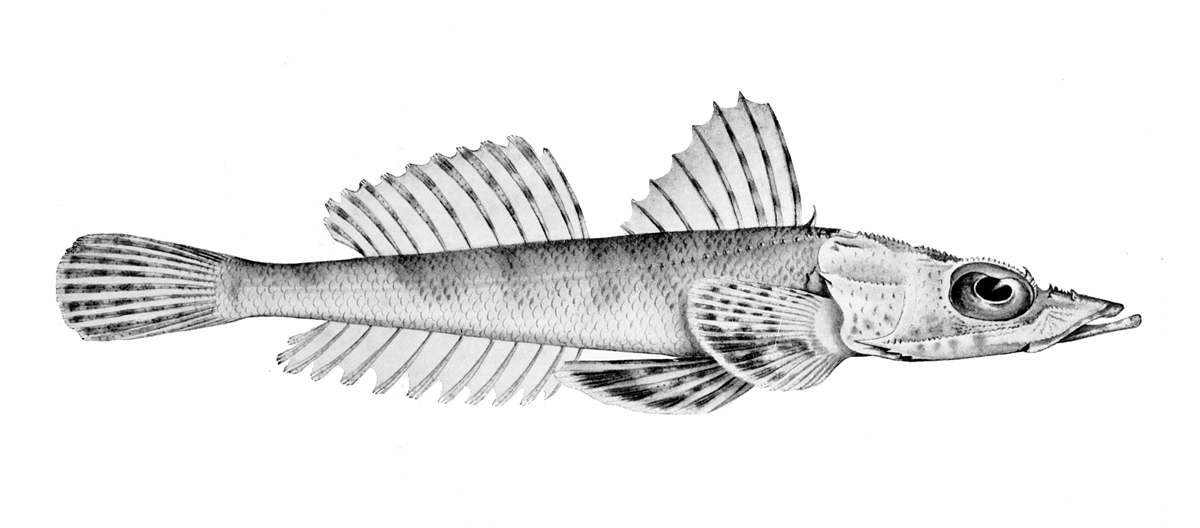

Conservation status
- Least Concern (IUCN 3.1)

Scientific classification
- Kingdom: Animalia
- Phylum: Chordata
- Class: Actinopterygii
- Order: Perciformes
- Family: Platycephalidae
- Genus: Ratabulus
- Species: R. tuberculatus

Binomial name
- Ratabulus tuberculatus (Cuvier 1829)

Synonyms
- Sorsogona tuberculata (Cuvier, 1829); Platycephalus tuberculatus Cuvier, 1829; Onigocia tuberculatus (Cuvier, 1829); Rogadius tuberculatus (Cuvier, 1829); Thysanophrys tuberculatus (Cuvier, 1829); Sorsogona serrulata Herre, 1934

= Tuberculated flathead =

Species of fish

The tuberculated flathead (Ratabulus tuberculatus) is a species of marine ray-finned fish belonging to the family Platycephalidae, the flatheads. This species is found in Indian and Western Pacific Oceans.

== Taxonomy ==
The tuberculated flathead was first formally described in 1829 as Platycephalus tuberculatus by the French zoologist Georges Cuvier with the type locality given as Trincomalee in Sri Lanka. In 1934 the Norwegian born American zoologist Albert William Herre described a new species, Sorsogona serrula, and classified it within a new monotypic genus, Sorsogona. Herre's name is a junior synonym of Cuvier's P. tuberculatus and this species has been regarded as the type species of Sorsogona. However, some authorities do not recognise Sorsogona as a valid genus and classify its species within the genus Ratabulus. Other authorities continue to recognise Sorsogona as a valid genus. The specific name tuberculatus refers to the bony tubercles on the gill cover and crown.

== Description ==
The tuberculated flathead has a slightly flattened, elongated body with a large, moderately flattened head. The ridges above the eye have small spines or serrations, some with twin points. The eyes are large with between 2 and 6 spines to their front which decrease in size from top to bottom and the upper-most has a smaller spine at its base. The diagonal scale rows slanting backward above the lateral line are roughly equal in number as the lateral-line scales. The lateral line scales number 47 to 54, typically 51 or 52, with the 12 to 28 nearest the head bearing a small spine or ridge, and the scales above these are frequently having a hook or tubercle. The first dorsal fin contains 8 or 9 spines and is short based, the first spine is very short and separate from the rest, the remaining spines are a lot longer while the second dorsal fin between 10 and 12, usually 11, soft rays. The second dorsal fin and the anal fin have a similar shape and are opposite each other but the anal fin has a slightly longer base than the second dorsal fin and also contains between 10 and 12 soft rays. The caudal fin is slightly rounded. The overall colour of the upper body is tan or pale olive-brown marked with 3 or 4 vague, transverse darker bands over the back, and pale ventrally. The pectoral and pelvic fins have several separate black bars, and have white margins to the fins. The maximum published total length of this species is 14 cm (5.5 in), although 12 cm (4.7 in) is more typical.

== Distribution and habitat ==
The tuberculated flathead is found in the Indo-West Pacific region where it is found from the Persian Gulf to Indonesia, the Philippines and northern Australia. In Australia it is found from Dampier, Western Australia to Moreton Bay, Queensland, It is found at depths between 9 and 80 m (30 and 262 ft) on sandy and muddy banks of the continental shelf.

== Biology ==
The tuberculated flathead feeds on shrimps, crustacean larva, molluscs, fish scales and crabs.

== Fisheries ==
The tuberculated flathead is of no commercial value but is taken as bycatch but this is normally discarded at sea.
