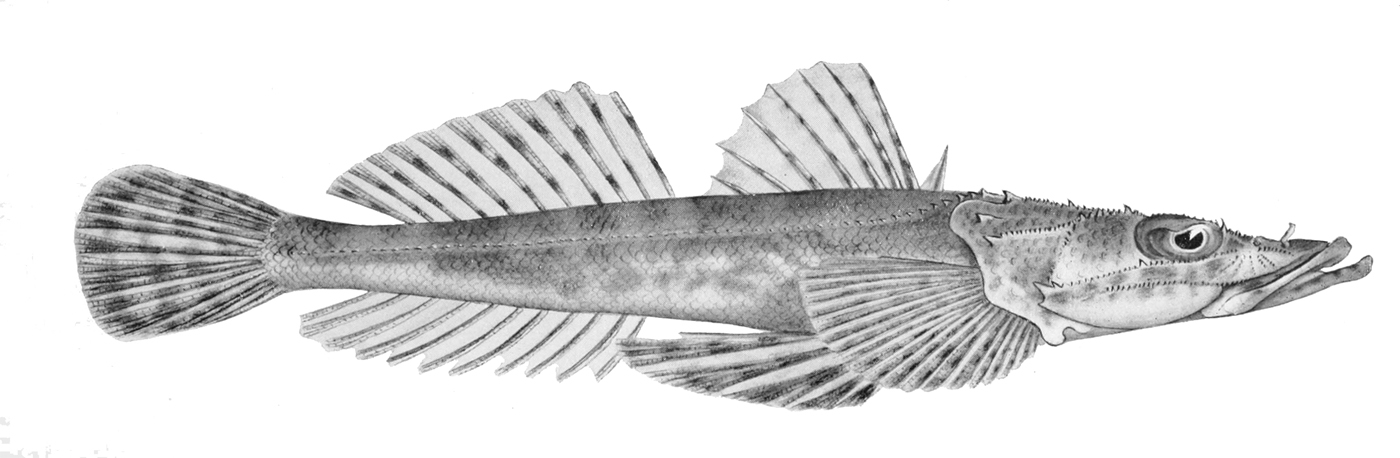

Scientific classification
- Domain: Eukaryota
- Kingdom: Animalia
- Phylum: Chordata
- Class: Actinopterygii
- Order: Scorpaeniformes
- Family: Platycephalidae
- Genus: Ambiserrula; Imamura, 1996
- Species: A. jugosa

Binomial name
- Ambiserrula jugosa (McCulloch, 1914)

Synonyms
- Insidiator jugosus McCulloch, 1914; Suggrundus jugosus (McCulloch, 1914)

= Mud flathead =

Species of fish

The mud flathead (Ambiserrula jugosa) is a species of flathead endemic to the Pacific coastal waters of Australia where it occurs at depths of from 15 to 53 metres (49 to 174 ft) on the continental shelf. This species is the only known member of its genus.

== Taxonomy ==
The mud flathead was first formally described in 1914 as Insidiator jugosus by the Australian ichthyologist Allan Riverstone McCulloch with its type locality given as off Hervey Bay in Queensland. In 1996 Hisashi Imamura proposed the monospecific genus Ambiserrula for this taxon. The genus name Ambuserrula combines ambi, meaning "around", and serrula, meaning "little saw", an allusion to the saw-like suborbital ridge which bears fine serrations. The specific name jugosa means "mountainous", an allusion McCulloch did not explain but it may refer to the ridges on the head.

== Description ==
The mud flathead has a elongate, moderately flattened body with a large, flat head that is equivalent in length to just under 40% of the standard length and large eyes. It has a large mouth too which extends back to the front of the eye, although the teeth are small with the largest being on two patches on the vomer and in a thin band on the palatine.There are typiocally 3 spines on the preoperculum. The suprarobital ridge has serrations with a cluster of small spines to its rear. There is a raw of small preorbital spines. The suborbital ridge has many small serrations, There are two dorsal fins, the first contains 9 spines, although the first is very short may be separate from the membrane, and is short based, and the second has 11 or 12, typically 12, soft rays. The anal fin usually has 11 soft rays but may have 12. The irises have long branched lappets on them. The overall colour is brown to greyish marked with four, or so, wide dark bands on the back, 4 or 5 dark blotches on the sides of head, a wide dark bar underneath the eye, and dark blotching and streaking on the lower flanks. The maximum published length of this species is 21 cm (8.3 in).

== Distribution and habitat ==
The mud flathead is endemic to Australia, where it occurs on the eastern coast between the Great Barrier Reef northwest of Cape Melville in Queensland south to Botany Bay in New South Wales. It lives in silty and sandy bottoms in estuaries and shallow inshore waters, at deptsh between 15 and 53 m (49 and 174 ft).

== Biology ==
The mud flathead spends the day buried on the substrate and is thought to feed mostly on other fishes.

== Fisheries ==
The mid flathead is mostly taken as bycatch by trawlers.
