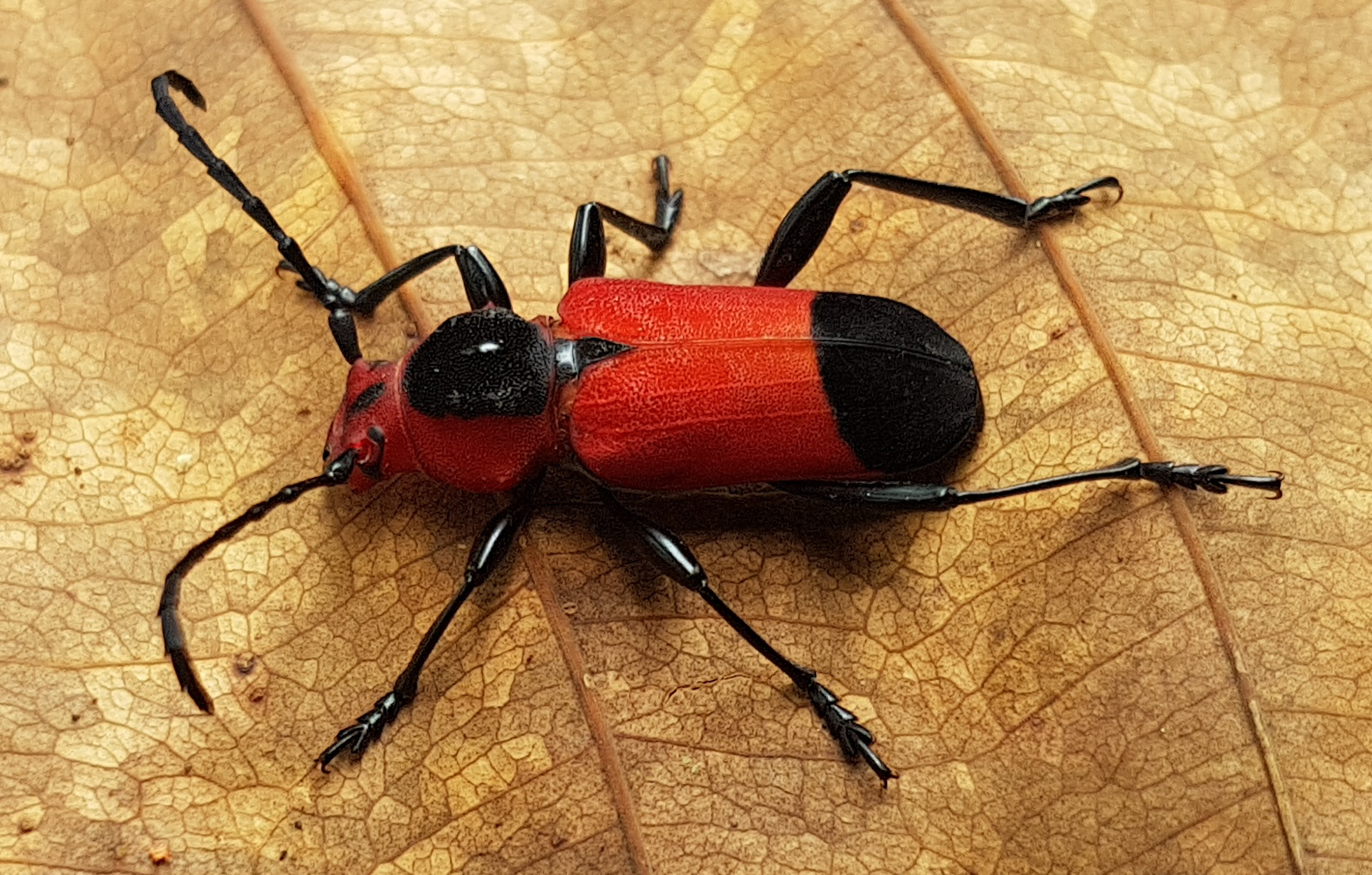
- Euryphagus maxillosus (female) from Mindanao, Philippines
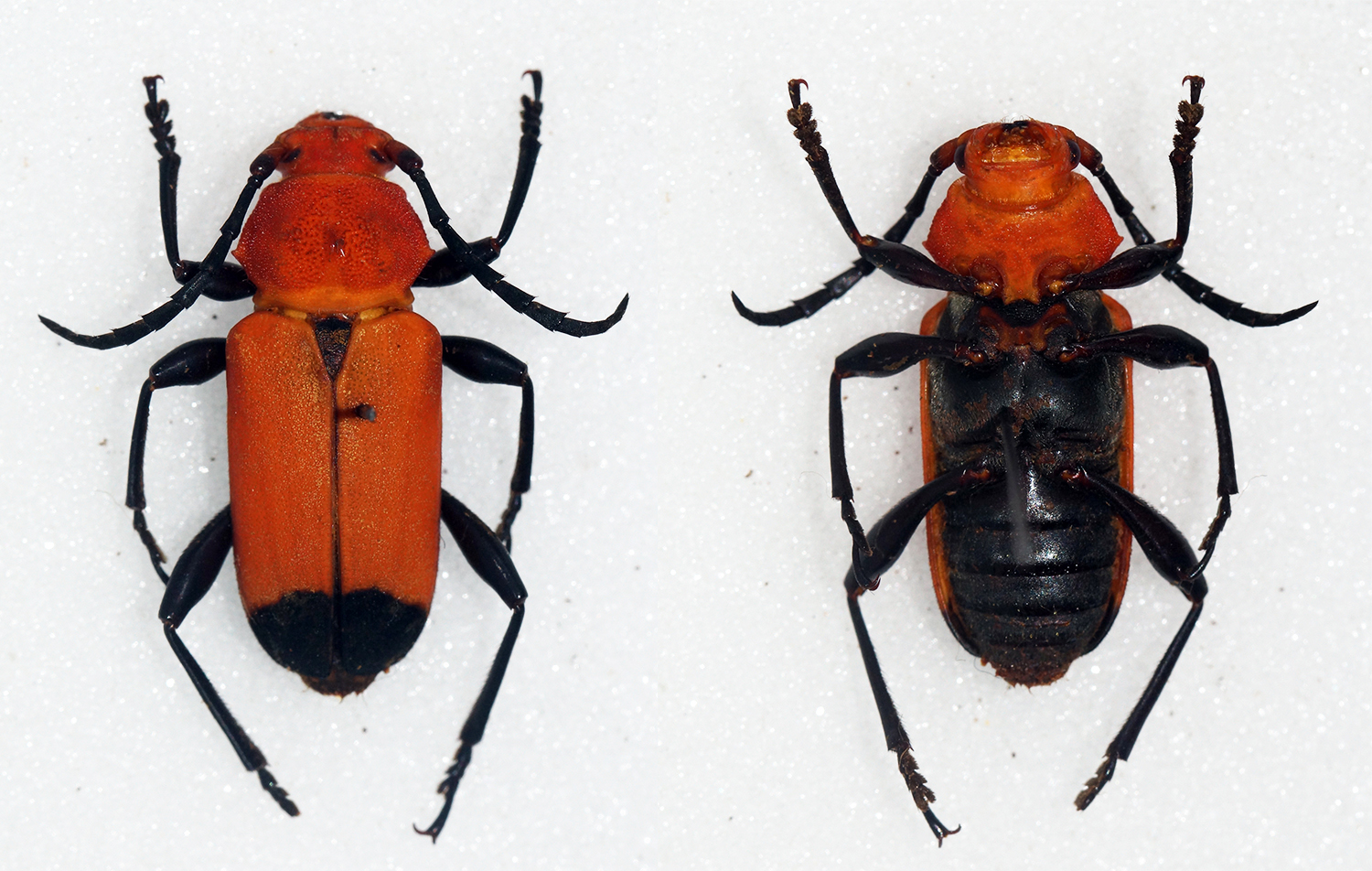
- Euryphagus lundii (female)

Scientific classification
- Kingdom: Animalia
- Phylum: Arthropoda
- Clade: Pancrustacea
- Class: Insecta
- Order: Coleoptera
- Suborder: Polyphaga
- Infraorder: Cucujiformia
- Family: Cerambycidae
- Tribe: Trachyderini
- Genus: Euryphagus; J. Thomson, 1864

Type species
- Cerambyx lundii Fabricius, 1793

Species
- See text.

Synonyms
- Eurycephalus Dejean, 1835 nec Gray, 1831

= Euryphagus =

Genus of beetles

Euryphagus is a genus of longhorn beetles native to tropical Asia. It is classified in the family Cerambycidae, subfamily Cerambycinae, and the tribe Trachyderini. The generic name is derived from Greek εὐρύς (eurús, "wide") and φαγεῖν (phageîn, "to eat") referring to the broad mandibles of the males.

== Species ==
Euryphagus includes the following species, along with their synonyms and distribution ranges:

- Euryphagus lundii (Fabricius, 1793) - found throughout tropical Asia

= Euryphagus nigripes (Olivier) Pascoe, 1866

- Euryphagus miniatus (Fairmaire, 1904) - found in southern China and Indochina

= Euryphagus chinensis Gressitt, 1939

- Euryphagus maxillosus (Olivier, 1795) - Borneo, Sumatra, Java, Laos, Myanmar, Malaya, Philippines

= Euryphagus pictus (Voet, 1778) (permanently unavailable)
Euryphagus quadrimacula (Voet, 1806) (permanently unavailable)
Euryphagus bipunctatus (Schoenherr, 1817)
Euryphagus nigricollis (Heller, 1913)

- Euryphagus ustulatus Achard, 1912 - found in Borneo
- Euryphagus variabilis (Pascoe, 1860) - found in the Maluku Islands
