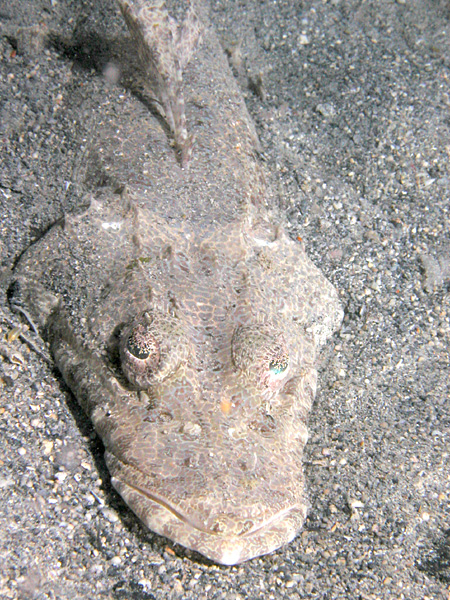
- Sunagocia otaitensis

Scientific classification
- Kingdom: Animalia
- Phylum: Chordata
- Class: Actinopterygii
- Division: Teleostei
- Order: Perciformes
- Suborder: Scorpaenoidei
- Family: Platycephalidae; Swainson, 1839

Genera
- See text

= Platycephalidae =

Family of ray-finned fishes

The Platycephalidae are a family of marine ray-finned fish, most commonly referred to as flatheads. They ambush predators which lay on the seabed, being demersal. The family ranges throughout the Indo-Pacific.

== Taxonomy ==
Platycephalidae was first proposed as a family in 1839 by the English naturalist William Swainson. The 5th edition of Fishes of the World classifies this family within the suborder Platycephaloidei in the order Scorpaeniformes. Other authorities differ and do not consider the Scorpaeniformes to be a valid order because the Perciformes is not monophyletic without the taxa within the Scorpaeniformes being included within it. These authorities consider the Platycephalidae to belong to the suborder Platycephaloidei, along with the families Bembridae, Parabembridae, Hoplichthyidae and Plectrogeniidae within the Perciformes.

=== Genera ===
Platycephalidae has the following 17 genera (including about 86 species) classified within it:

- Ambiserrula Imamura, 1996 (monotypic)
- Cociella Whitley, 1940 (6 species)
- Cymbacephalus Fowler, 1938 (4 species)
- Elates D. S. Jordan & Seale, 1907 (monospecific)
- Grammoplites Fowler, 1904 (4 species)
- Inegocia D. S. Jordan & W. F.Thompson, 1913 (3 species)
- Insidiator D. S. Jordan & Snyder, 1900 (3 species)
- Kumococius Matsubara & Ochiai, 1955 (monospecific)
- Leviprora Whitley, 1931 (2 species)
- Onigocia D. S. Jordan & W. F. Thompson, 1913 (9 species)
- Papilloculiceps Fowler & Steinitz, 1956 (monotypic)
- Platycephalus Bloch, 1795 (19 species)
- Ratabulus D. S. Jordan & Hubbs, 1925 (10 species)
- Rogadius D. S. Jordan & Richardson, 1908 (7 species)
- Solitas Imamura, 1996 (monotypic)
- Sunagocia Imamura, 2003 (5 species)
- Thysanophrys Ogilby, 1898 (10 species)

Platycephalidae has been divided into as many as 5 subfamilies by some authors but Fishes of the World does not recognise subfamilies but does state that some authors recognise two subfamilies. The two subfamilies are Platycephalalinae, containing Elates and Platycephalus, and Onigociinae, containing the remaining genera. These two groupings are thought to have become divergent in the Eocene with the Platycephalinae being predominantly temperate and Onigociinae, being predominantly tropical. The basal Platycephalinae species are confined to southern Australia and the more derived taxa have diversified in the tropical Indo-West Pacific.

The genus Sorsogona is recognised by Fishbase but, apparently, it does not include the type species, Sorsogona serrulata, as a species within it. Catalog of Fishes treats this genus as a synonym of Rogadius but classifies all the species in Ratabulus, including the type species, which it treats as a synonym of Ratabulus tuberculatus.

=== Etymology ===
The name of the family is derived from the Greek words platy, meaning "flat", and kephale for "head".

== Description ==
Platycephalids are small to medium-sized fish. Most species are small, reaching an average of 10 cm in length. However, a few species in the genus Platycephalus are known to grow up to over a 1 m (3 ft 3 in) in length. Their most distinctive characteristic is the flattened shape of their heads. While the rest of their bodies is shaped similarly to other fish that inhabit the areas they frequent, their heads are triangle-shaped and dorsoventrally depressed, giving them the shape of a trowel or an artist's spatula. Their eyes are situated on the upper surface, in accordance with their bottom-dwelling lifestyle. They possess two complete dorsal fins, the first one supported by six to 9 strong spines.

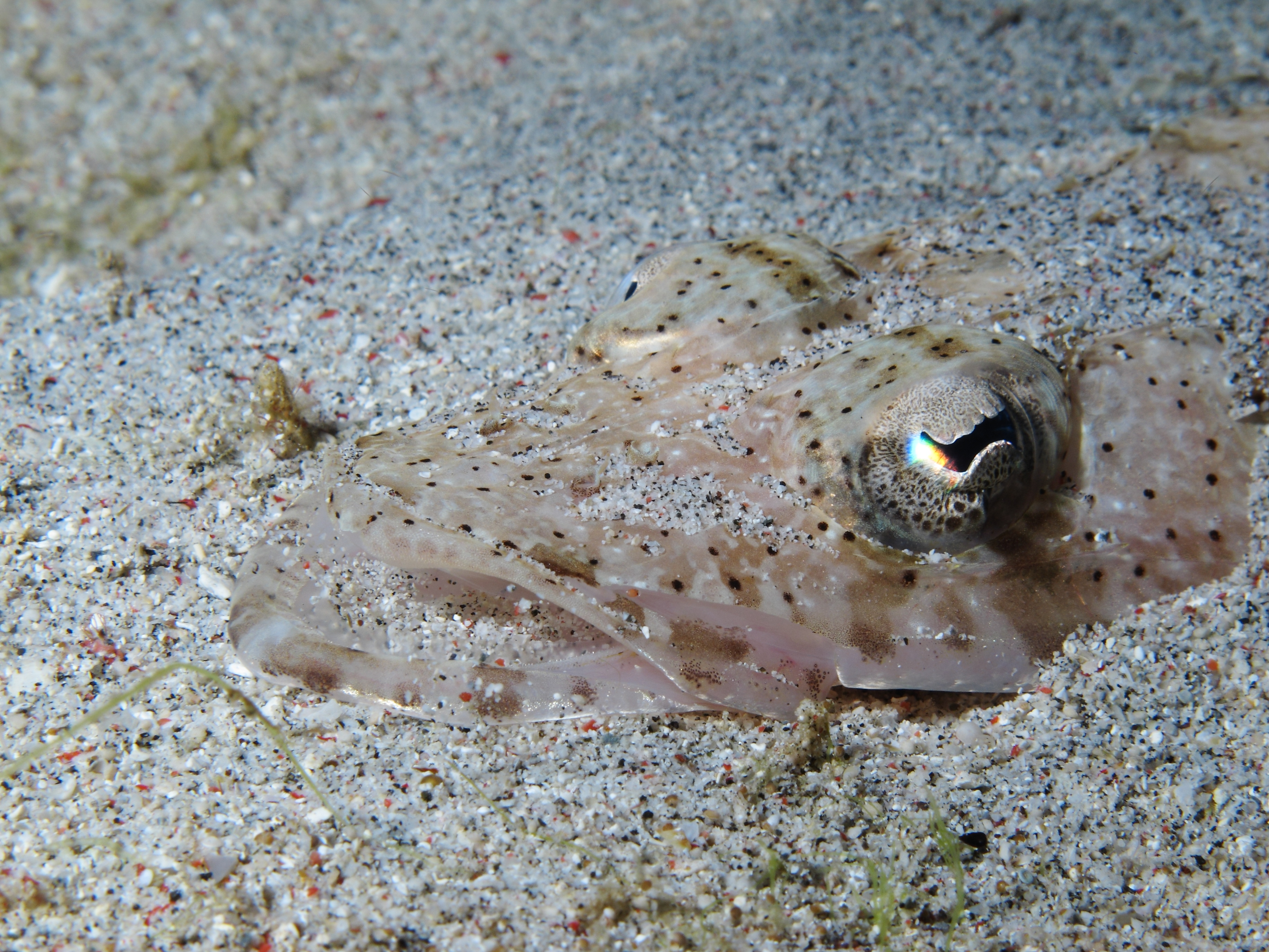
A platycephalid buried in the sand (Komodo, Indonesia)

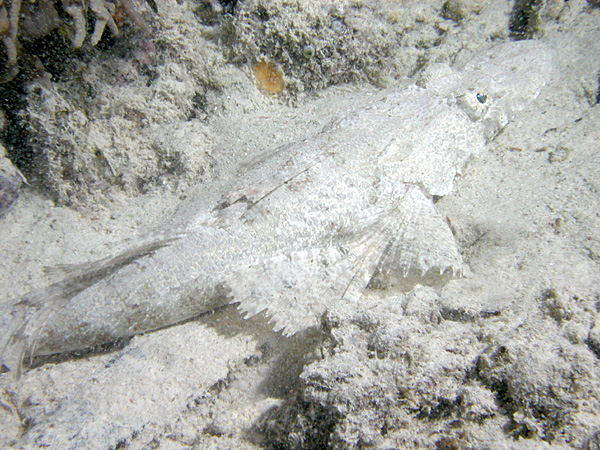
A platycephalid in Papua New Guinea

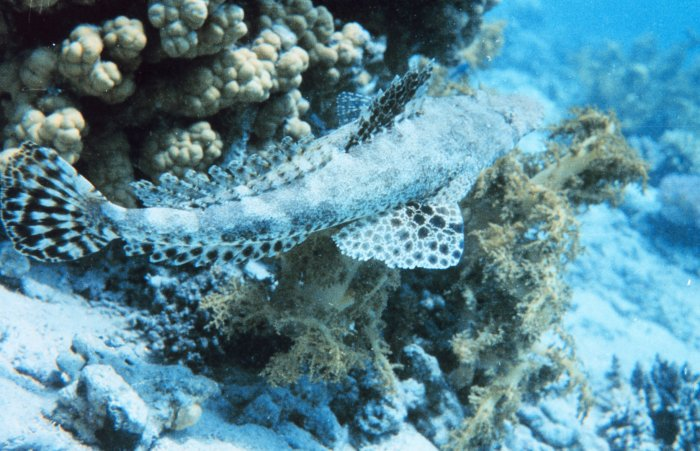
A platycephalid swimming

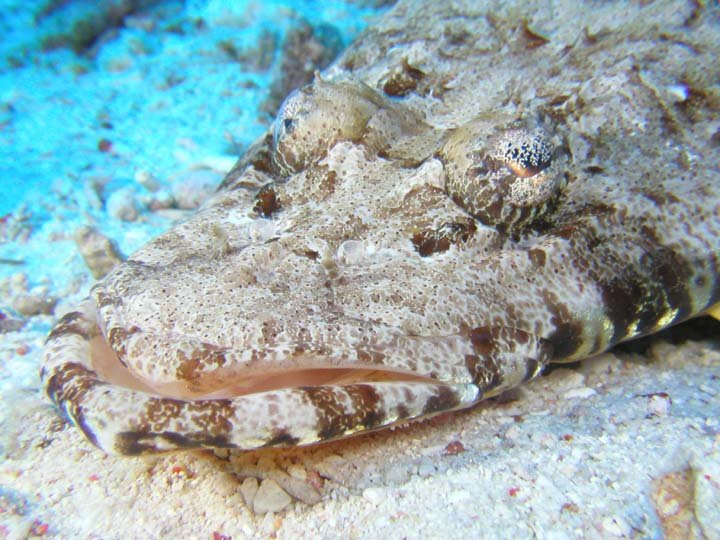
Papilloculiceps longiceps

Platycephalus fuscus

== Distribution and habitat ==
Platycephalidae can be found naturally in coastal waters throughout the Indo-Pacific. A few species have been caught in the eastern Mediterranean, having traveled there from the Red Sea through the Suez Canal (Lessepsian migration).

== Biology ==
Flatheads are mostly marine demersal fish, often resting directly on the seabed, sometimes partially buried in sand or mud. They can be found in a wide range of depths, ranging from 10 m to the edge of the continental shelf at depths of about 300 m (980 ft).

Flatheads are carnivorous, feeding on small fish and crustaceans. They lie in wait buried by sand, with only their eyes poking out from the substrate. When prospective prey walks or swims close to the platycephalid's head, the flathead strikes rapidly, engulfing the prey in its large mouth. As flatheads are ambush predators they are expected to be relatively sedentary and not move large distances as adults. However, recent research has shown that part of the population of some flathead species makes long-distance movements or spawning migrations.

== Fisheries ==
Active commercial fisheries are geared towards members of the family. In Japan, some species are the subject of experimental aquaculture programs. Flatheads are commonly caught on rod and line. The larger species are considered game fish.

== See also ==
- Flathead (fish)
