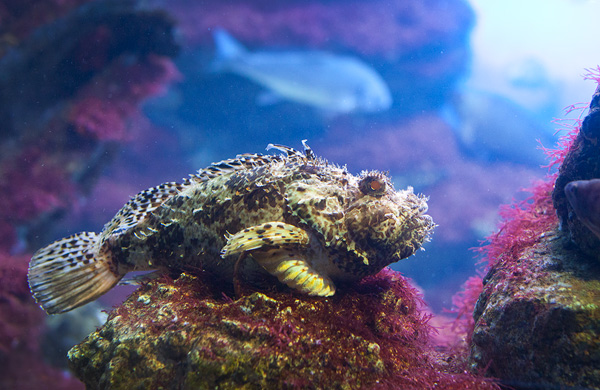
- Scorpaena porcus
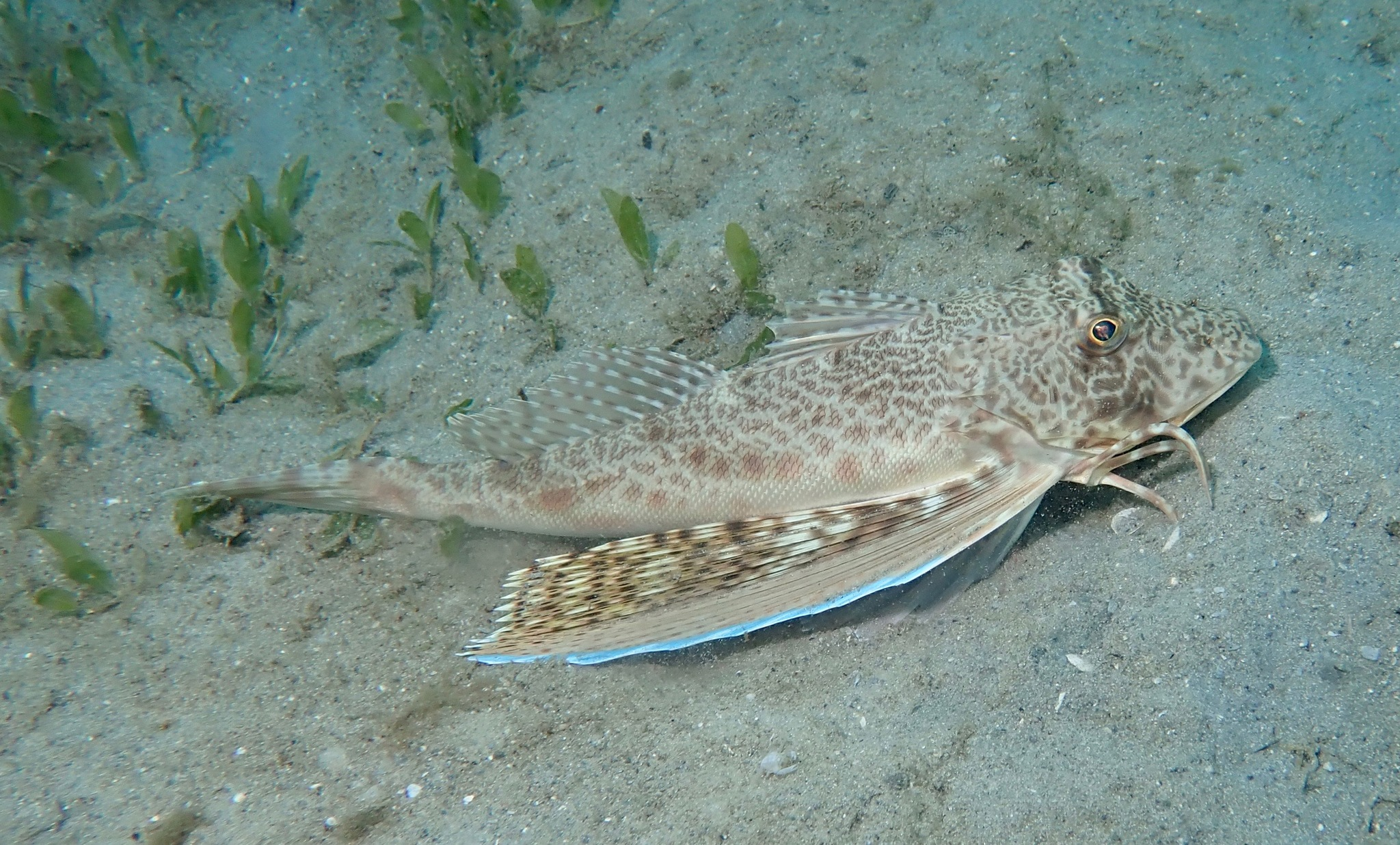
- Prionotus punctatus

Scientific classification
- Kingdom: Animalia
- Phylum: Chordata
- Class: Actinopterygii
- Order: Perciformes
- Suborder: Scorpaenoidei; Garman, 1899

Families
- See text

Synonyms
- Platycephaloidei Matsubara, 1943

= Scorpaenoidei =

Scorpaenoidei Temporal range: Early Eocene–recent

Suborder of ray-finned fishes

Scorpaenoidei is a suborder of ray-finned fishes, part of the order Perciformes, that includes the scorpionfishes, lionfishes, stonefishes, sea robins and flatheads. This suborder is at its most diverse in the Pacific and Indian Oceans but is also found in the Atlantic Ocean.

== Taxonomy ==
Scorpaenoidei was first named as a suborder in 1899 by the American ichthyologist Samuel Garman as a suborder of the Perciformes. Some authorities still treat the suborder as being part of the Perciformes but the 5th Edition of Fishes of the World recognises the Scorpaeniformes as a valid order and places this suborder within it. The subfamilies of the family Scorpaenidae are treated as families by some authors. It has been argued by some authors that the suborder is paraphyletic and that a more correct classification is that the grouping, with some differences, be placed on the superfamily Scorpaenoidea.

In the past, the suborder Platycephaloidei (containing searobins and flatheads) was treated as a distinct suborder within Scorpaenifomes. However, as Scorpaeniformes has been subsumed within the Perciformes, the suborder is now considered synonymous with Scorpaenoidei.

The earliest known member of the suborder is the Early Eocene-aged Eosynanceja, which is also one of the earliest known perciforms. A well-preserved skeleton of an indeterminate scorpaenoid is also known from the Early Eocene-aged Monte Bolca site in Italy.

== Families and subfamilies ==
The suborder Scorpaenoidei is classified into families and subfamilies in Eschmeyer's Catalog of Fishes as follows:

- Suborder Scorpaenoidei
  - Family Platycephalidae Swainson, 1839 (flatheads)
  - Family Hoplichthyidae Kaup, 1873 (spiny flatheads)
  - Family Triglidae Rafinesque, 1815 (searobins)
    - Subfamily Prionotinae Kaup, 1873 (spiny searobins)
    - Subfamily Peristediinae Jordan & Gilbert, 1883 (armored gurnards)
    - Subfamily Pterygotriglinae Fowler, 1938 (spotted gurnards)
    - Subfamily Triglinae Rafinesque, 1815 (gurnards)
  - Family Bembridae Kaup, 1873 (deepwater flatheads)
  - Family Synanceiidae Swainson, 1839 (stonefishes)
    - Subfamily Apistinae Gill, 1859 (wasp scorpionfishes)
    - Subfamily Perryeninae Honma, Imamura & Kawai, 2013 (whitenose pigfishes)
    - Subfamily Eschmeyerinae Mandrytsa, 2001 (cofishes)
    - Subfamily Gnathanacanthinae Gill, 1892 (red velvetfishes)
    - Subfamily Aploactininae Jordan & Starks, 1904 (velvetfishes)
    - Subfamily Pataecinae Gill, 1872 (prowfishes)
    - Subfamily Tetraroginae Smith, 1949 (waspfishes)
    - Subfamily Choridactylinae Kaup, 1859 (stingers)
    - Subfamily Synanceiinae Swainson, 1839 (stonefishes)
  - Family Neosebastidae Matsubara, 1943 (gurnard scorpionfishes)
  - Family Plectrogeniidae Fowler, 1938 (stinger flatheads)
  - Family Scorpaenidae Risso, 1827 (scorpionfishes)
    - Subfamily Scorpaeninae Risso, 1826 (scorpionfishes and lionfishes)
    - Subfamily Caracanthinae Gill, 1885 (orbicular velvetfishes or coral crouchers)
    - Subfamily Pteroinae Kaup, 1873 (turkeyfishes and lionfishes)
    - Subfamily Setarchinae Matsubara, 1943 (deep-sea bristly scorpionfishes)
    - Subfamily Sebastolobinae Matsubara, 1943 (thornyheads)
    - Subfamily Sebastinae Kaup, 1873 (rockfishes)
  - Family Congiopodidae Gill, 1889 (racehorses or pigfishes)
  - Family Zanclorhynchidae Andriashev, 1993 (horsefishes)
  - Family Normanichthyidae Clark, 1937 (barehead scorpionfishes)

== Characteristics ==
Scorpaenoidei is rather varied grouping of around 470 species of moderately-sized fishes which have 24 to 44 vertebrae and the ribs towards the head are either absent or rigidly attached to the spine. Benthic members of this suborder (previously placed in the suborder Platycephaloidei) are characterised by having elongate bodies with flattened heads which typically have ridges and spines. There are two separate dorsal fins, the pelvic fins are widely separated and have a single spine and typically 5 soft rays, although the pelvic fins of the genus Hoplichthys has 3 soft rays. The anal fin may contain 0, 1 or 3 spines and between 5 and 18 soft rays. They may or may not have a swimbladder. The flatheads of the family Platycephalidae are the largest fishes within this taxon with some attaining lengths of 70 cm (28 in).

== Distribution and habitat ==
Scorpaenoidei are found in all the tropical and temperate oceans of the world but most species are found in the Indian and Pacific Oceans. The suborder includes benthic and pelagic species and marine and freshwater species. Platycephalids are not found in the New World and are found in the temperate and tropical waters where they are demersal fishes found from relatively shallow inshore waters to moderate depths of around 1,500 m (4,900 ft) in offshore waters. The Triglidae are more widely distributed and are also demersal fishes occurring on the continental shelf on sand or mud substrates.

== Venom ==
Scorpaenoidei contains some of the most venomous fish species known, including lionfishes, stonefishes and other scorpionfishes. Velvetfishes are also venomous.

== Fisheries ==
Some species of sea robins are of commercial importance and some flatheads are important food fishes, particularly in Australia.
