= Hemisalanx =

Scientific classification
- Kingdom: Animalia
- Phylum: Chordata
- Class: Actinopterygii
- Order: Osmeriformes
- Family: Salangidae
- Genus: Hemisalanx; Regan, 1908
- Species: H. brachyrostralis

Binomial name
- Hemisalanx brachyrostralis (P. W. Fang, 1934)

Synonyms
- Salanx brachyrostralis Fang, 1934

Genus of fishes

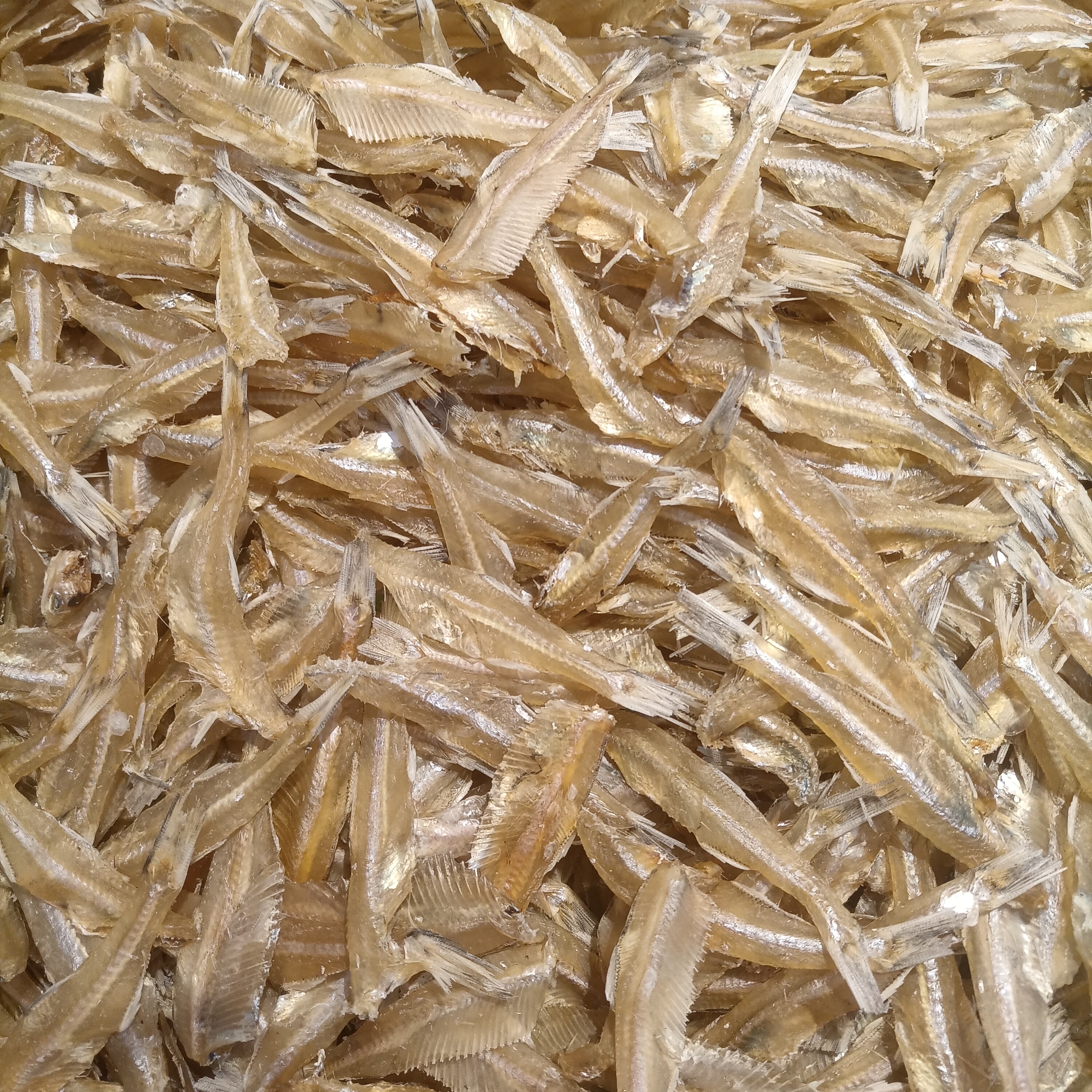

Hemisalanx brachyrostralis is a species of icefish endemic to the Yangtze basin, China. It is the only known species in the genus Hemisalanx, after Hemisalanx prognathus was moved to genus Salanx. In a study of the five freshwater icefish species in the Yangtze, it was a relatively low-density species, being much less frequent than Neosalanx taihuensis and N. oligodontis, but more than Protosalanx hyalocranius and N. tangkahkeii. H. brachyrostralis reaches up to 13.6 cm (5.4 in) in total length.
