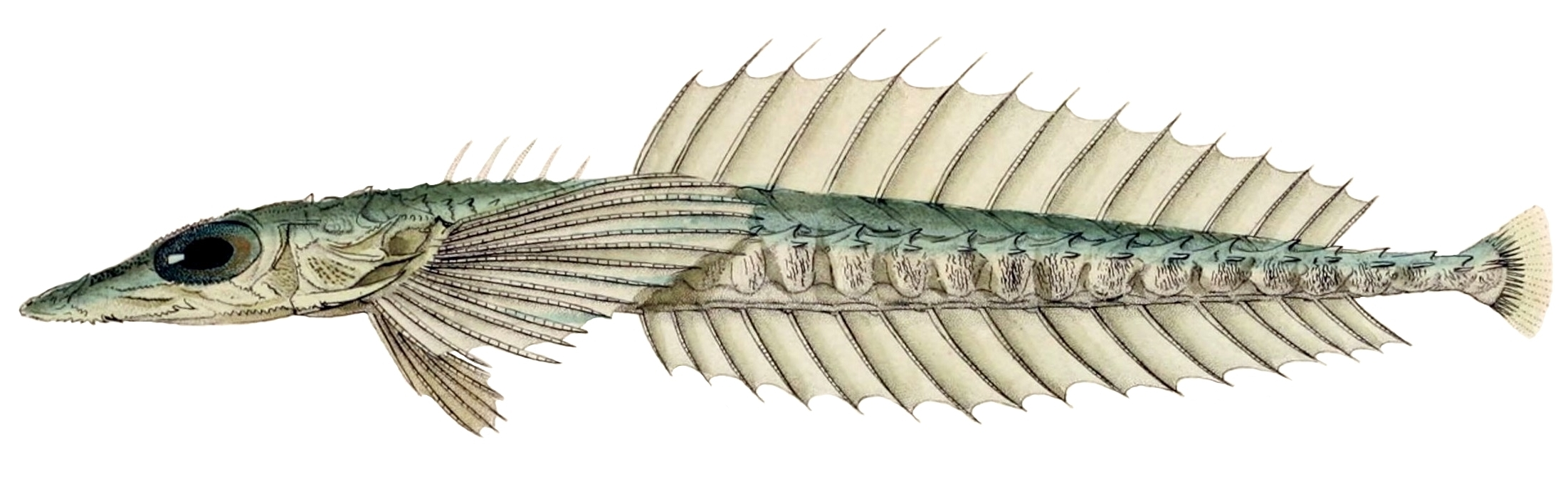
- Hoplichthys langsdorfii
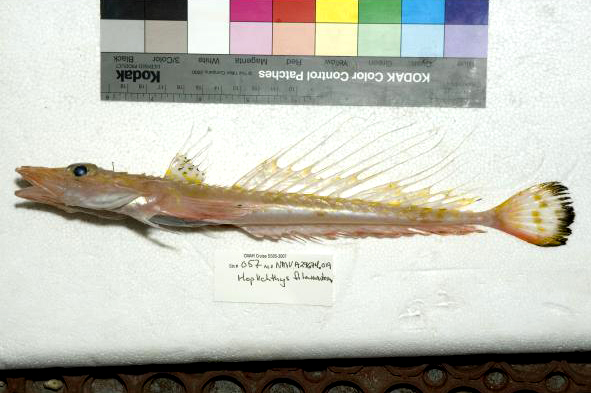
- Hoplichthys filamentosus

Scientific classification
- Kingdom: Animalia
- Phylum: Chordata
- Class: Actinopterygii
- Division: Teleostei
- Order: Perciformes
- Suborder: Scorpaenoidei
- Family: Hoplichthyidae; Kaup, 1873
- Genus: Hoplichthys; Cuvier, 1829

Type species
- Hoplichthys langsdorfii G. Cuvier, 1829

Synonyms
- Acanthoplichthys Fowler, 1943; Monhoplichthys Fowler, 1938; Pristhoplichthys Fowler, 1938; Rhinhoplichthys Fowler, 1938

= Hoplichthys =

Genus of ray-finned fishes

Hoplichthys, the ghost flatheads, is a genus of marine ray-finned fishes native to the Indian and Pacific Oceans. This genus is the only member of the family Hoplichthyidae.

== Taxonomy ==
Hoplichthys was first proposed as a monotypic genus in 1829 by the French zoologist Georges Cuvier when he described its type species, and only species at that time, H. langsdorfi from Japan. In 1873 the German naturalist Johann Jakob Kaup considered that the genus Hoplichthys was so different from other "flathead" taxa that it merited placing in a monogeneric family, the Hoplichthyidae. The 5th edition of Fishes of the World classifies this family within the suborder Platycephaloidei in the order Scorpaeniformes. Other authorities differ and do not consider the Scorpaeniformes to be a valid order because the Perciformes is not monophyletic without the taxa within the Scorpaeniformes being included within it. These authorities consider the Platycephalidae to belong to the suborder Platycephaloidei, along with the families Bembridae, Parabembridae, Platycephalidae and Plectrogeniidae within the Perciformes. However, some workers have put forward evidence that there may be a rather surprising sister group relationship between this family and the gobies as they share more seemingly unique derived characters with each other than with other taxa, this needs to be further investigated,.

== Etymology ==
Hoplichthys combines hoplo, meaning "armed", with ichthys, which means fish. There is series of large bony plates on the body of H. langsdorfii, each of which bears two spines and this is thought what the first part of the genus name refers to. Cuvier spelled it as Oplichthys in hist text but it was Hoplichthys in the table of contents and this is the prevailing usage.

== Species ==
There are currently 17 recognized species in this genus:

- Hoplichthys acanthopleurus Regan, 1908
- Hoplichthys citrinus C. H. Gilbert, 1905 (Lemon ghost flathead)
- Hoplichthys fasciatus Matsubara, 1937
- Hoplichthys filamentosus Matsubara & Ochiai, 1950 (Long-ray ghost flathead)
- Hoplichthys gilberti D. S. Jordan & R. E. Richardson, 1908
- Hoplichthys gregoryi (Fowler, 1938)
- Hoplichthys haswelli McCulloch, 1907 (Armoured flathead)
- Hoplichthys imamurai Nagano, McGrouther & Yabe, 2013 (Imamura's ghost flathead)
- Hoplichthys langsdorfii Cuvier, 1829
- Hoplichthys mcgroutheri Nagano, Imamura & Yabe, 2014 (McGrouther's ghost flathead)
- Hoplichthys mimaseanus Nagano, Endo & Yabe, 2013
- Hoplichthys ogilbyi McCulloch, 1914 (Ogilby's ghost flathead)
- Hoplichthys pectoralis (Fowler, 1943)
- Hoplichthys platophrys C. H. Gilbert, 1905
- Hoplichthys prosemion (Fowler, 1938)
- Hoplichthys regani D. S. Jordan, 1908 (Ghost flathead)
- Hoplichthys smithi (Fowler, 1938)

== Characteristics ==
Hoplichthys ghost flatheads have a very wide, flattened head, an elongate body which has no scales but does have many spines and ridges on the upper body, There is a row of large spined bony plates, called scutes, running along the middle of the flanks. The lowermost 3 to 5 fin rays of the pectoral fin are separated from the membrane. There are no spines in the anal fin and they have 26 vertebrae. They have large mouths with tiny villiform teeth in the jaws, on the vomer, on the palatine and in the pharynegeals. There are two separate dorsal fins, the first is short-based and contains 6 or 7 spines and the second is long-based and contains between 13 and 16 soft rays. The anal fin has a single spine and between 15 and 17 soft rays and is around the same length as the second dorsal fin. The caudal fin can be rounded or it can be emarginate. The pelvic fins are located on the thoraxand have a single spine and 5 soft rays. The majority of the species are yellow, pinkish, or brown in colour on the upper body and flanks, with various spots and mottles, and they are pink, white or silver ventrally. The pectoral fins vary in colour from yellowish brown to hyaline marked with crossbarring, spotting or mottling. The first dorsal fin is frequently dark towards its rear, or has wavy line across it. The caudal fin is typically hyaline, although in some species it has a dark distal margin or spots at the base. The maximum length attained by these fishes varies from a standard length of 6.7 cm (2.6 in) in H. fasciatus to 43 cm (17 in) in H. haswelli.

== Distribution, habitat and biology ==
Hoplichthys ghost flatheads have an Indo-Pacific distribution, occurring from the eastern coast of Africa to Hawaii. they are benthic fishes living on the bottom in continental shelf and slope waters at depths between 50 and 1,500 m (160 and 4,920 ft). The larvae and juveniles are found in shallower water than the adults. These fishes prey on a variety of crustaceans and other fishes.
