= Bambradon =

Scientific classification
- Kingdom: Animalia
- Phylum: Chordata
- Class: Actinopterygii
- Order: Perciformes
- Family: Bembridae
- Genus: Bambradon; D.S. Jordan & R.E. Richardson, 1908
- Species: B. laevis

Binomial name
- Bambradon laevis (Edvard Nyström, 1887)

Synonyms
- Bembras laevis Nyström, 1887

Genus of fishes

Bambradon is a monotypic genus of marine ray-finned fish belonging to the family Bembridae, the deepwater flatheads. Its only species, Bambradon laevis, is found in the northwestern Pacific Ocean off Japan.

== Taxonomy ==
Bambradon has a single species, B' laevis which was first formally described in 1887 as Bembras laevis by the Swedish veterinarian Edvard Nyström in his publication of the collection of fishes from Japan held in the zoological museum of Uppsala University with its type locality given as Nagasaki. In 1908 the American ichthyologists David Starr Jordan and Robert Earl Richardson placed B. laevis in the monotypic genus Bambradon within the family Bembridae. The genus name is an ancient Greek word for a type of small fish, thought to be applied by Jordan and Richardson to emulate Georges Cuvier’s etymology for Bembras. The specific name laevis means "smooth", alluding to the smooth top of the head of this species, lacking spines and ridges.

== Description ==
Bambradon has 6 spines in the first dorsal fin and 14 soft rays in the second dorsal fin while the anal fin has 15 soft rays. The upper side of head shows a complete absence of spines and ridges. It has a more elongated body than the sympatric Bembras japonicus with its depth being a tenth of its total length. The large ates are about a quarter of the length of the head and they are separated by a thin intraorbital space. It has rather a long snout, approximately three times as long as the head. The lower jaw protrudes significantly beyond the maxilla and the mouth opening stretches back not quite to the centre of the eye. The head, apart from the upper and middle jaw, is covered with quite large scales. There are 3 long ridges ending in small spines on the operculum and the preoperculum has 2 small spines at its angle there is a further small spine on the scapula. The fine, comb-like teeth are on the jaws, vomer and palatine. The first dorsal fin is quite high, its spines are weak and flexible with the second spine being the longest, its length slightly greater than the depth of the body. The second dorsal fin is rather higher the first soft ray is the longest, with the 4th and 5th soft rays being the shortest and from then backwards they become longer. The anal fin is slightly longer than the two dorsal fins. The pectoral fins are quite short and extend to, or just to the rear of, the anal fin origin. There are 23 fin rays in the pectoral fin. The shorter pelvic fins are located quite far to the front of the front of the pectoral fins, just behind angle of the preoperculum. The overall colour is brownish marked with a line of darker spots along lower edge of body. the ventral body is nearly white. The first dorsal fin has a black spot at its front and the second dorsal fin appears to have horizontal dark stripes or spots arranged in rows, however, these are difficult to discern as the fin membranes are missing on the examined specimens. The caudal fin has a round black spot at its upper base and a pair of faint diagonal bars. The anal fin is bright with a dark band at the base, the pectoral fins are brown and unmarked while the pelvic fins white.

== Distribution and habitat ==
Bambradon is a deep water, demersal species of the northwestern Pacific Ocean off Japan.
