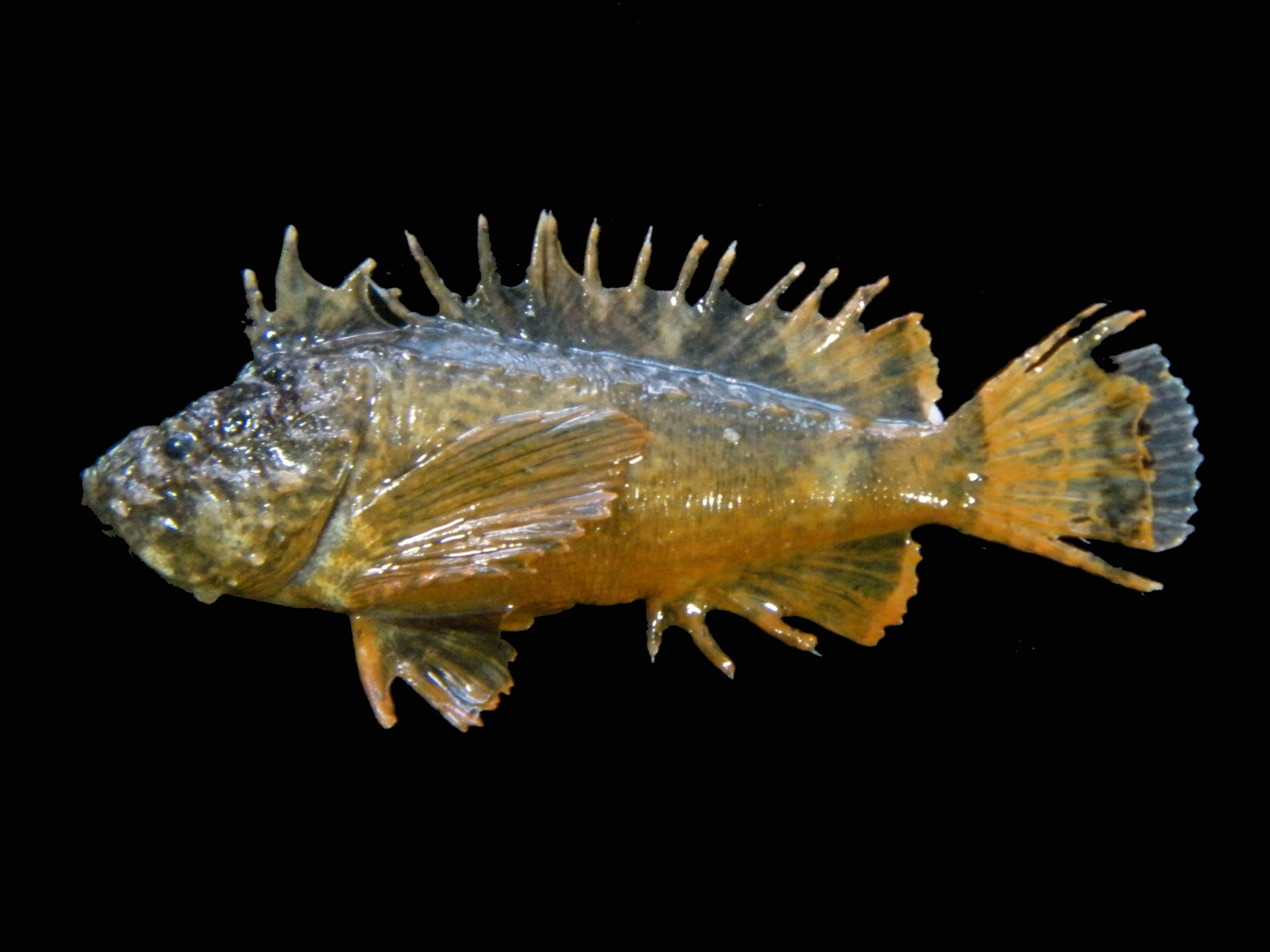

Scientific classification
- Kingdom: Animalia
- Phylum: Chordata
- Class: Actinopterygii
- Order: Perciformes
- Family: Synanceiidae
- Genus: Vespicula
- Species: V. trachinoides

Binomial name
- Vespicula trachinoides (Cuvier, 1829)

Synonyms
- Apistus trachinoides Cuvier, 1829; Trichosomus trachinoides Cuvier, 1829; Prosopodasys bottae Sauvage, 1878; Vespicula bottae (Sauvage, 1878); Prosopodasys gogorzae Jordan & Seale, 1905; Vespicula gogorzae (Jordan & Seale, 1905)

= Mangrove waspfish =

Species of fishes

The mangrove waspfish (Vespicula trachinoides), also known as the goblinfish, is a species of marine ray-finned fish, a waspfish belonging to the subfamily Tetraroginae, which is classified as part of the family Scorpaenidae, the scorpionfishes and their relatives. This species occurs in the Indo-Pacific region.

== Taxonomy ==
The mangrove waspfish was first formally described as a species in 1829 as Apistus trachinoides by the French zoologist Georges Cuvier with the type locality given as Java in Indonesia. In 1905 the American ichthyologists David Starr Jordan and Alvin Seale described a new species from Japan which they called Prosopodasys gogorzae and in 1910 Jordan and Robert Earl Richardson described a new genus, Vespicula for P. gogorzae. In 2001 Sergey Anatolyevich Mandrytsa proposed that Prosopodasys was a synonym of Vespicula. Various workers had then included the species Apistus bottae, Apistus dracaena, Prosopodasys cypho, Apistes depressifrons, Apistus trachinoides and Apistus zollingeri in the genus Vespicula. More recently A. depressifrons was placed in the monotypic genus Neovespicula, A. dracaena in Pseudovespicula, and this species into Trichosomus with A. bottae and A. gogorzae being regarded as junior synonyms of this species. As the type species of Vespicula is regarded as a junior synonym of T. trachinoides, it follows that Vespicula is a junior synonym of Trichosomus. Fishbase still recognises Vespicula with 3 species, but Catalog of Fishes recognises Trichosomus and places the other two species in Pseudovespicula. The specific name Trachinoides means "like Trachinus", the weever genus.

== Description ==
The mangrove waspfish has a laterally compressed body which is covered in small scales. The dorsal fin contains between 13 and 16 spines, with the first 3 spines apparently separated from rest of dorsal fin but they are connected to it by a very low membrane, and 3.5 to 5.5 soft rays. The origin of the dorsal fin sits between the rear margin of the orbit and the posterir margin of the preoperculum. The anal fin has 3 spines and 3.5 to 4.5 soft rays. The pelvic fins have 1 spine and 4 soft rays. The snout has a length equal to or longer than diameter of the eye. This species attains a maximum standard length of 5.8 cm (2.3 in). The body has a mottled pattern of black and greenish yellow blotches while soft-rayed portions of dorsal and anal fins have a wide black band.

== Distribution and habitat ==
The mangrove waspfish is found in the Indo-Pacific from the Mergui Archipelago off Myanmar east to the Philippines and Sulawesi and north to Vietnam and Hainan. This species ca be found in estuarine areas, including mangrove creeks over substrates of soft sand and shell fragments.

== Biology ==
The mangrove waspfish has venomous spines.
