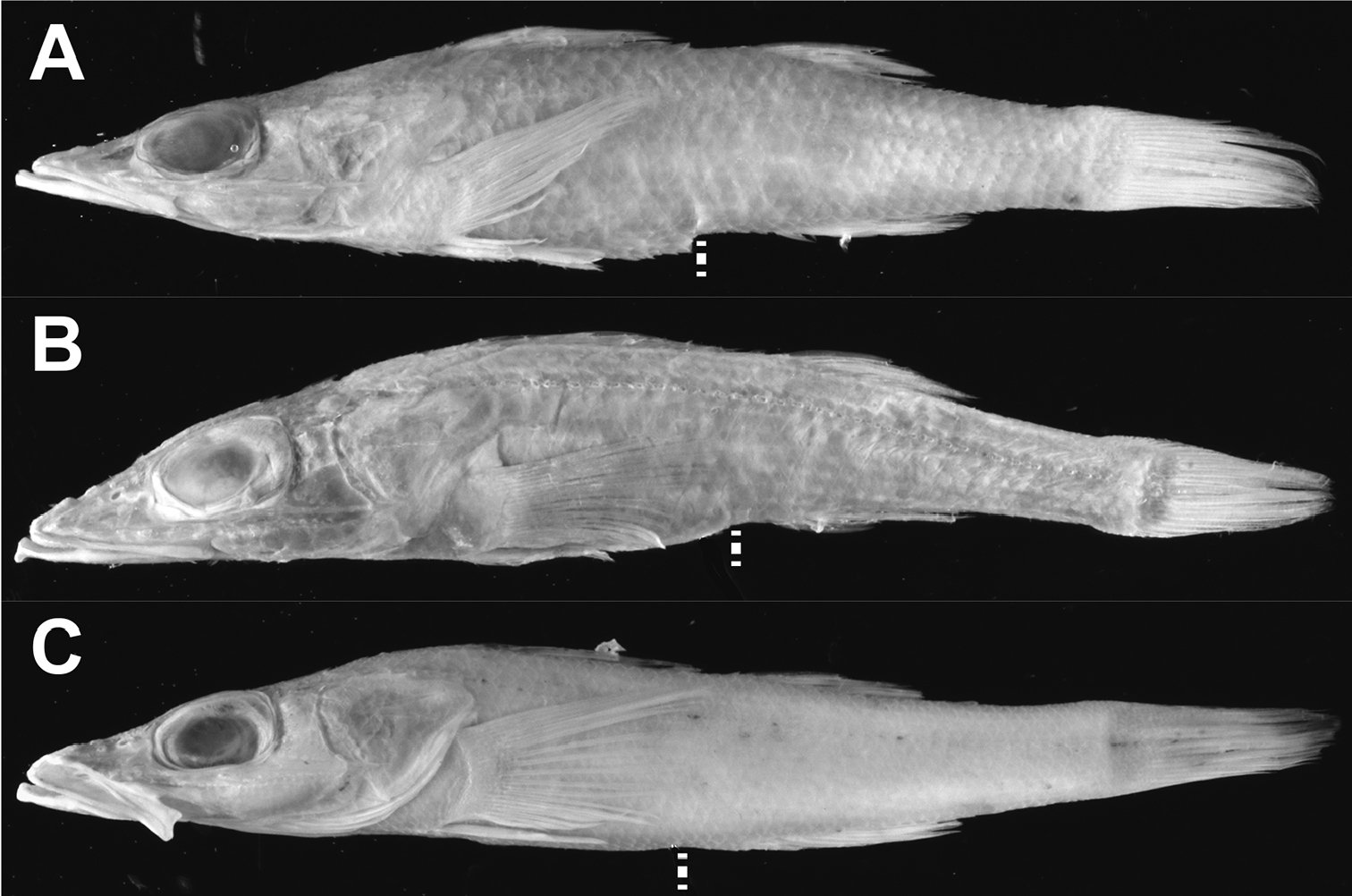
- Lateral view of the three species of Parabembras; A P. curta, FAKU 41447, 143.5 mm SL B P. robinsoni, NSMT-P 129791, 165.1 mm SL C P. multisquamata, holotype, MNHN-IC-2008-1516, 167.3 mm SL. White line indicates anus.

Scientific classification
- Kingdom: Animalia
- Phylum: Chordata
- Class: Actinopterygii
- Order: Perciformes
- Family: Bembridae
- Genus: Parabembras
- Species: P. curta

Binomial name
- Parabembras curta (Temminck & Schlegel, 1843)

Synonyms
- Bembras curtus Temminck & Schlegel, 1843

= Parabembras curta =

Species of fish

Parabembras curta, is a species of marine ray-finned fish belonging to the family Bembridae, the deepwater flatheads. It is found in western Pacific Ocean.

== Taxonomy ==
Parabembras curta was first formally described as Brembras curtus in 1843 by Coenraad Jacob Temminck and Hermann Schlegel with its type locality given as Nagasaki in Japan. In 1978 Pieter Bleeker recognised that this species should be placed in a different genus from Bembras and so he classified it in a new monotypic genus he called Parabembras. This genus is sufficiently different from the other genera in that family to be classified as their own family, Parabembradidae, by some authorities. The specific name curta means "short" and although Temminck and Schlegel did not explain this it is thought to be a reference to the shorter snout of this species in conmparison to Brembas japonicus.

== Description ==
Parabembras curta has a head and body which is reddish orange and white ventrally. The fins are red in color. There is no symphyseal knob on the lower jaw, and this is the clear difference from Parabembras robinsoni. A single preocular spine two robust lachrymal spines present. There are 6–8 supraocular spines, 9 spines in the first dorsal fin and 34–39 pored lateral-line scales. Body cylindrical and posteriorly weakly compressed. Scales ctenoid. Opercle with upper and lower spines. Mouth large and slightly oblique. This species attains a maximum published standard length of 15.1 cm (5.9 in).

== Distribution and habitat ==
Parabembras curta is found in the northwestern Pacific Ocean where it has been recorded from Japan and Korea south to Taiwan and mainland China. It is a benthic species living on sand or mud substrates at depths between 60 and 141 m (197 and 463 ft).
