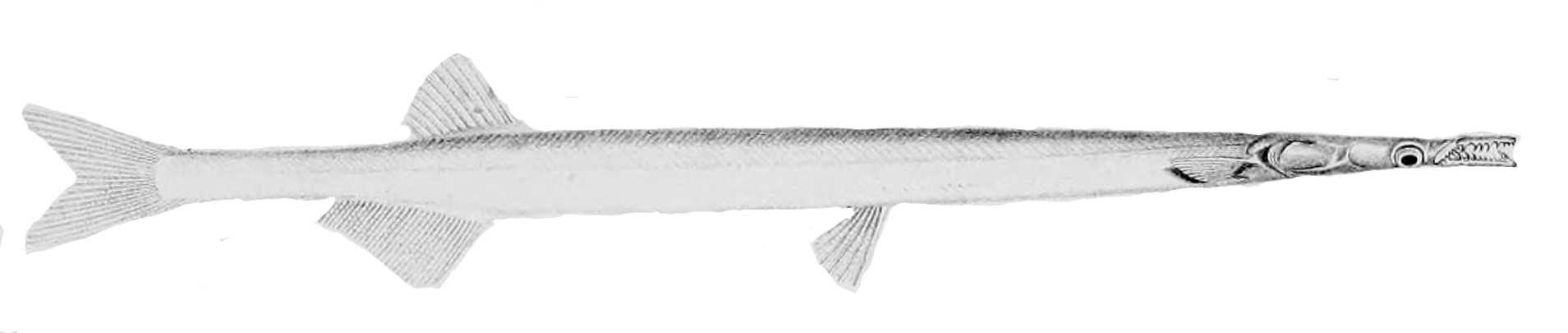

Conservation status
- Least Concern (IUCN 3.1)

Scientific classification
- Kingdom: Animalia
- Phylum: Chordata
- Class: Actinopterygii
- Order: Osmeriformes
- Family: Salangidae
- Genus: Neosalanx
- Species: N. tangkahkeii

Binomial name
- Neosalanx tangkahkeii (H. W. Wu, 1931)

Synonyms
- Neosalanx taihuensis N. S. Chen, 1956

= Neosalanx tangkahkeii =

Species of fish

Neosalanx tangkahkeii, the Chinese icefish or short-snout icefish, is a species of icefish endemic to fresh and brackish waters in China. Despite its common name it is not the only icefish in China, however the majority of the family to which it belongs are found in that country.

Neosalanx tangkahkeii is widely fished. In addition to being eaten in Asia, it is exported to southern Europe as a replacement of the more expensive transparent goby, a Mediterranean species used in the local cuisine. This replacement is often done openly, but sometimes it is done fraudulently.

== Appearance ==
Neosalanx tangkahkeii reached up to 6.3 cm (2.5 in) in standard length. They have a smooth, scale-less body, except the male has a thin line of scales at the tail base. The body is a white opaque color and the head is transparent.

== Conservation status ==
Neosalanx tangkahkeii is a widespread species and among others found in the Yangtze and Yellow River basins. In some parts of its range it is a relatively low-density species and in a survey of the five freshwater icefish species in the Yangtze, it was the least widespread and frequent. In some regions it has declined due to habitat loss, pollution and overfishing. Despite this the species is not considered threatened overall, being rated as least concern by the IUCN.

== As an introduced species ==
It is one of three icefish species (the others are N. pseudotaihuensis and Protosalanx) that has been introduced to several parts of China where not naturally found. Most of these attempted introductions failed, but some were successful. In the Yunnan lakes some attempts were successful and N. tangkahkeii is now often the most common fish species in them. Feeding on planktonic crustaceans and tiny fish, N. tangkahkeii has outcompeted certain native fish in these lakes, which have become rare and threatened.
