= Ariakehimeshirauo =

Conservation status
- Endangered (IUCN 3.1)

Scientific classification
- Kingdom: Animalia
- Phylum: Chordata
- Class: Actinopterygii
- Division: Teleostei
- Order: Osmeriformes
- Family: Salangidae
- Genus: Neosalanx
- Species: N. reganius

Binomial name
- Neosalanx reganius Wakiya & N. Takahashi, 1937

Species of fish

The ariakehimeshirauo (Japanese: アリアケヒメシラウオ, 有明姫白魚 ariake·hime·shira·uo, meaning 'dawn princess ice fish'), Neosalanx reganius, is a species of icefish in the family Salangidae endemic to Japan. It is only known from Midori and Chikugo Rivers in Kyushu. Its maximum total length is 63 mm (2.5 in), and has a lifespan of about one year. It seems to be relatively rare in its limited habitat, and is classified as an endangered species by IUCN.

N. reganius is an estuarine species, usually found in turbid waters with low salinity, or in fresh water. It is a planktivore. Relative to its size, it is highly fecund (347–1071 eggs per female), and the ovaries of gravid females made up 44% of their total body weight, on average.
