= Goblinfish =

Goblinfish may refer to:

- Glyptauchen panduratus
- Inimicus didactylus
- Vespicula trachinoides
