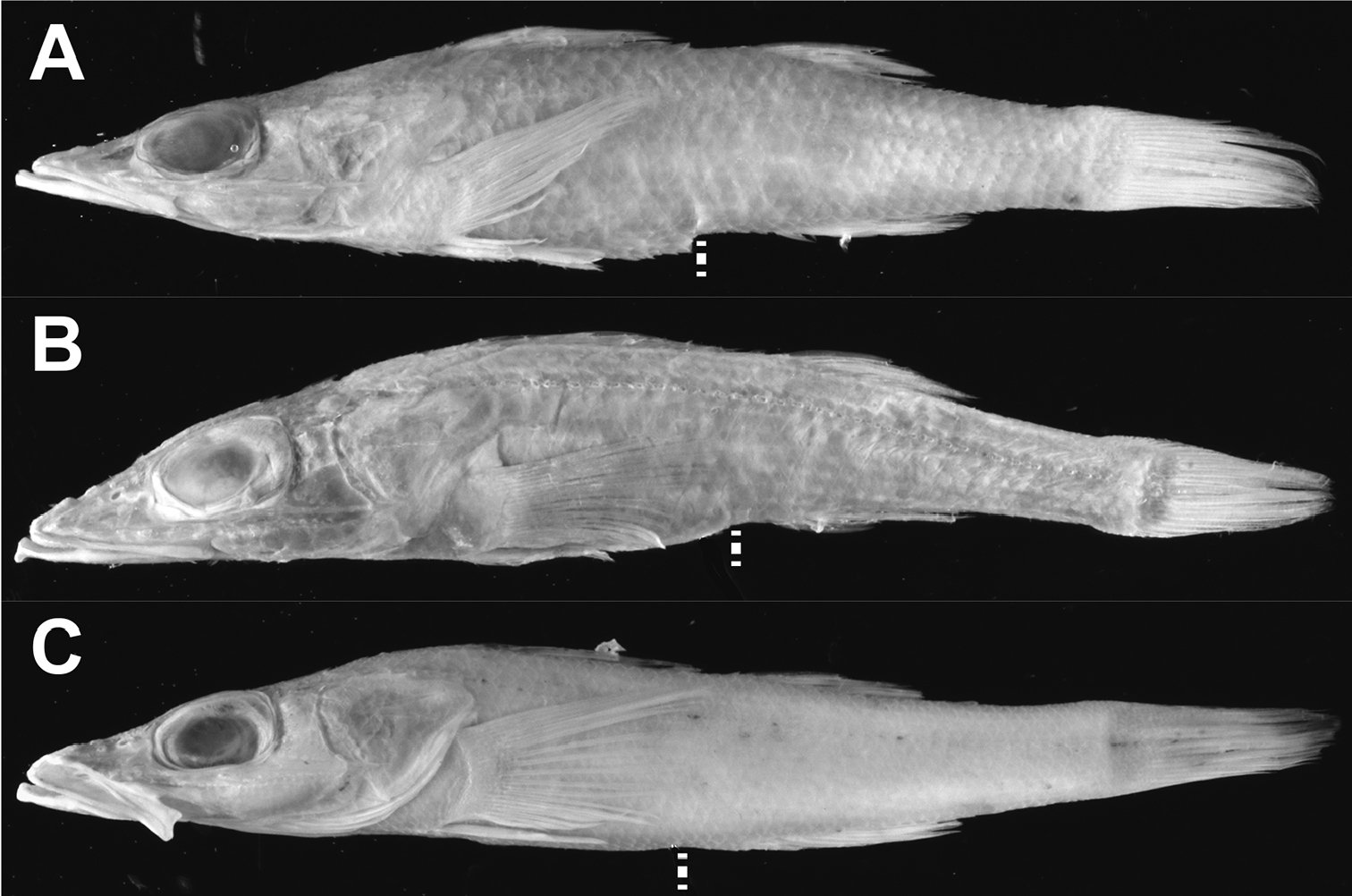
- Lateral view of the three species of Parabembras; A P. curta, FAKU 41447, 143.5 mm SL B P. robinsoni, NSMT-P 129791, 165.1 mm SL C P. multisquamata, holotype, MNHN-IC-2008-1516, 167.3 mm SL. White line indicates anus.

Scientific classification
- Kingdom: Animalia
- Phylum: Chordata
- Class: Actinopterygii
- Order: Perciformes
- Family: Bembridae
- Genus: Parabembras
- Species: P. multisquamata

Binomial name
- Parabembras multisquamata Y. Kai, Fricke, 2018

= Parabembras multisquamata =

Species of fish

Parabembras multisquamata, is a species of marine ray-finned fish belonging to the family Bembridae, the deepwater flatheads. It is found in the tropical western Pacific Ocean.

== Taxonomy ==
Parabembras multisquamata was first formally described in 2018 by Yoshiaki Kai and Ronald Fricke with the type locality given as Big Bay on Espiritu Santo in Vanuatu. Fricke first reported this species in Papua New Guinea in 2015 and this specimen is now one of the paratypes of this species. The genus Parabembras is sufficiently different from the other genera in that family to be classified as their own family, Parabembradidae, by some authorities. The specific name multisquamata is a combination of multi, which means "many", and squamatus, meaning "scaled", a reference to the high number, i.e. 40-44, of pored scales in the lateral-line.

== Description ==
Parabembras multisquamata has a reddish-orange head and body and white ventrally. The first dorsal fin is dark red in color with the second dorsal fin red with black marking. Pectoral fin bright red. A symphyseal knob on the lower jaw is absent. Two preocular spines and two lachrymal spines are present. There are 9–11 supraocular spines and 10 spines in the first dorsal fin. Body cylindrical and posteriorly weakly compressed. Scales ctenoid. Mouth large and slightly oblique. This species attains a maximum published standard length of 15.1 cm (5.9 in).

== Distribution and habitat ==
Parabembras multisquamata occurs in the tropical western Pacific Ocean where it has been recorded from the Philippines, Papua New Guinea and Vanuatu. It is a bathydemersal species that is found at depths between 299 and 444 m (981 and 1,457 ft).
