= Brachybembras =

Scientific classification
- Kingdom: Animalia
- Phylum: Chordata
- Class: Actinopterygii
- Order: Perciformes
- Family: Bembridae
- Genus: Brachybembras; Fowler, 1938
- Species: B. aschemeieri

Binomial name
- Brachybembras aschemeieri Fowler, 1938

Species of fish

Brachybembras is monotypic genus of marine ray-finned fish belonging to the family Bembridae, the deepwater flatheads. Its only species, Brachybembras aschemeieri, is known only from the Pacific Ocean around the Philippines where it is found at a depth of around 582 metres (1,909 ft).

== Taxonomy ==
Brachybembras was first described as a genus in 1938 by the American zoologist Henry Weed Fowler when he described its only species B. aschemieri. The type locality of B. aschemieri was given as off Jolo Light, near Jolo in the Philippines.

== Etymology ==
The genus name combines brachy, "short", with Bembras as this taxon has a shorter snout than Bembras. The specific name honours Charles R. W. Aschemeier (1892-1973), a taxidermist at the U.S. National Museum of Natural History.

== Characteristics ==
Brachybembras has no spines in the anal fin, a terminal lower jaw which does not protrude beyond the upper jaw and having the maxillae being relatively wide to its rear. There are 8 spines in the first dorsal fin and 12 soft rays in the second. The lateral line has 32 scales. The pectoral fins each have 21 fin rays.

There is a strong suborbital ridge created by the second and third infraorbital bones and this bears 5 spines. There are 11 spines in the anal fin and the eyes are large, being a third of the size of the head.

The colour is described as being pale brown, paler on the head with a whitish snout. The fins are greyish withwhite rays.

== Distribution and habitat ==
Brachybembras is found in the tropical western Pacific Ocean where it has been recorded from the Philippines. It is a benthopelagic species which has been recorded at depths down to 582 m (1,909 ft).
