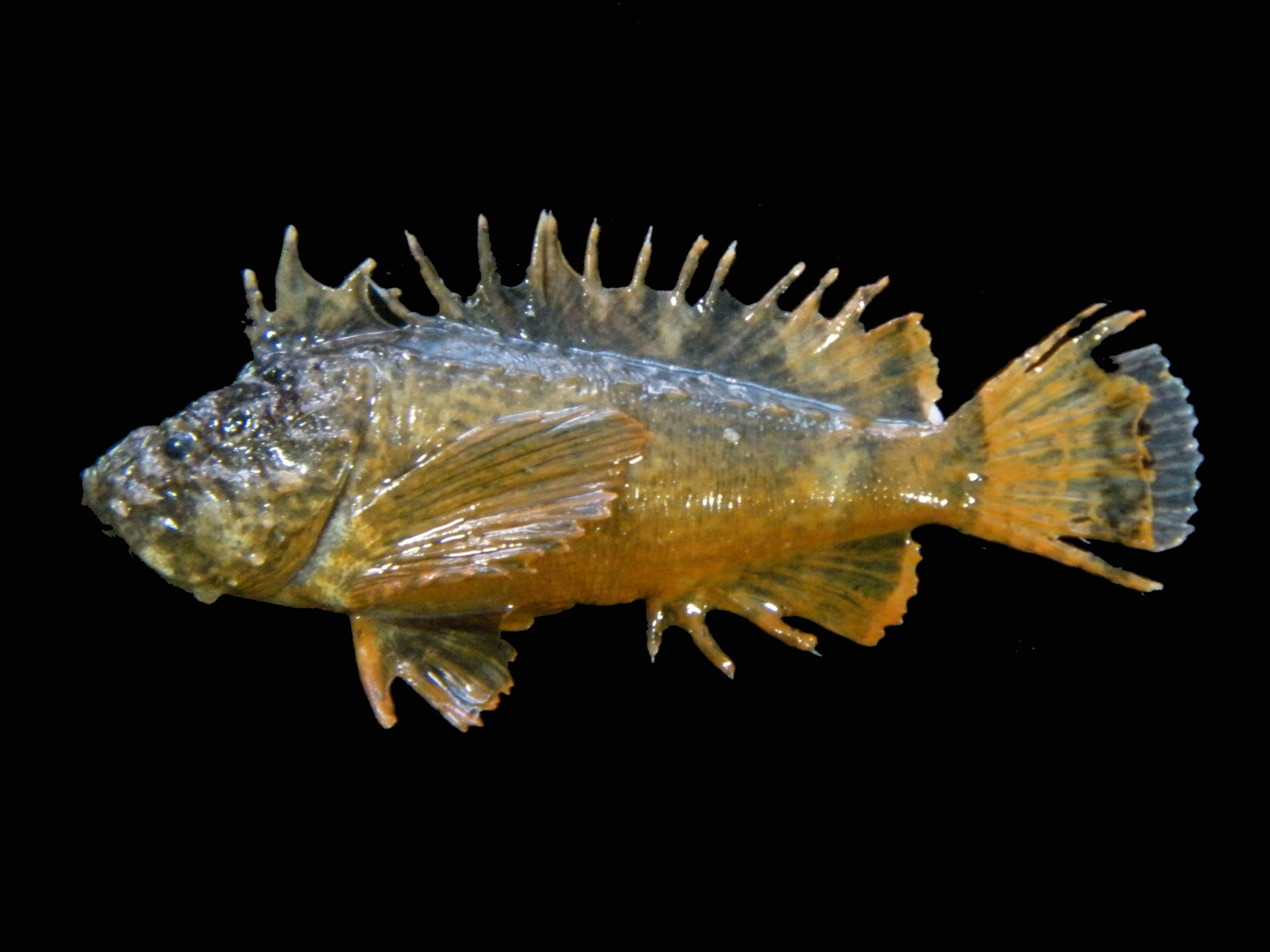
- Vespicula trachinoides

Scientific classification
- Kingdom: Animalia
- Phylum: Chordata
- Class: Actinopterygii
- Order: Perciformes
- Family: Synanceiidae
- Subfamily: Tetraroginae
- Genus: Vespicula; D. S. Jordan & R. E. Richardson, 1910

Type species
- Prosopodasys gogorzae D.S. Jordan & Seale 1905

= Vespicula =

Genus of fishes

Vespicula is a genus of venomous ray-finned fishes, waspfishes belonging to the subfamily Tetraroginae, which is classified as part of the family Scorpaenidae, the scorpionfishes and their relatives. These fishes are native to the Indian Ocean and the western Pacific Ocean. Although FishBase recognises this genus as valid, other authorities, such as the Catalog of Fishes regard it as a synonym of Trichosomus.

== Taxonomy and etymology ==
Vespicula was first described as a genus in 1910 by the American ichthyologists David Starr Jordan and Robert Earl Richardson as a monotypic genus containing only Prosopodasys gogorzae, which they also designated the type species. P. gogorzae had been described by Jordan and Alvin Seale in 1905 from the Negros in the Philippines. This genus is included in the subfamily Tetraroginae within the Scorpaenidae in the 5th edition of Fishes of the World however other authorities place that subfamily within the stonefish family Synanceiidae, while other authorities classify this subfamily as a family in its own right.

In 2001 Sergey Anatolyevich Mandrytsa proposed that Prosopodasys was a synonym of Vespicula. Various workers had then included the species Apistus bottae, Apistus dracaena, Prosopodasys cypho, Apistes depressifrons, Apistus trachinoides and Apistus zollingeri in the genus Vespicula. More recently A. depressifrons was placed in the monotypic genus Neovespicula, A. dracaena in Pseudovespicula, and A. trachinoides into Trichosomus with A. bottae and A. gogorzae being regarded as junior synonyms of Trichosomus trachinoides. As the type species of Vespicula is regarded as a junior synonym of T. trachinoides, it follows that Vespicula is a junior synonym of Trichosomus. This left P. cypho and A. zollingeri in Vespicula but these two species share a number of characteristics with P. dracaena so they were placed in an expanded Pseudovespicula.

The genus name Vespicula is a diminutive of Vespa, meaning wasp, i.e. a waspfish.

== Species ==
Vespicula contains the following 3 valid species according to FishBase:

- Vespicula cypho (Fowler, 1938) (Hunchback waspfish)
- Vespicula trachinoides (G. Cuvier, 1829) (Mangrove waspfish)
- Vespicula zollingeri (Bleeker, 1848)
