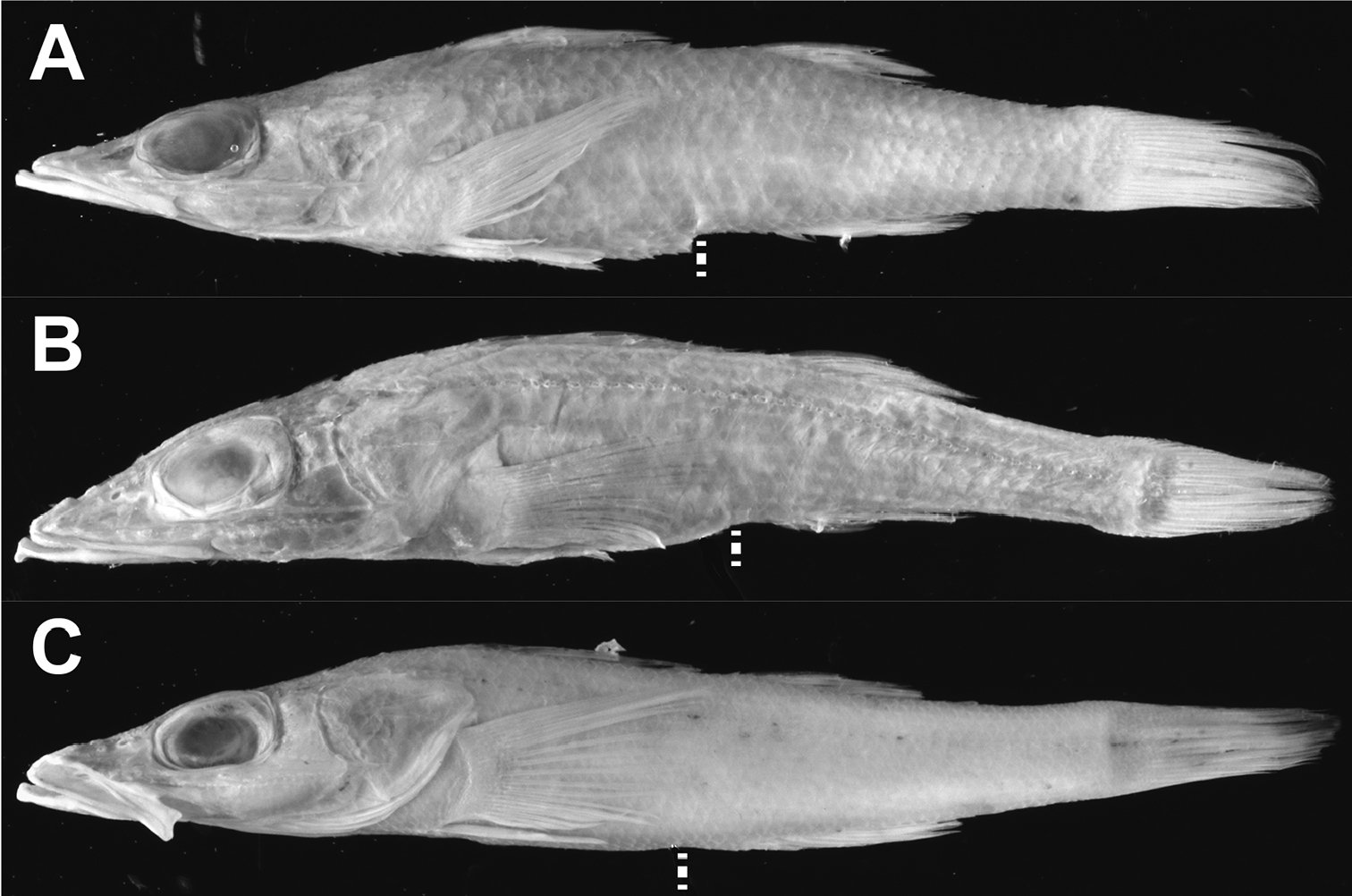
- Lateral view of the three species of Parabembras; A P. curta, FAKU 41447, 143.5 mm SL B P. robinsoni, NSMT-P 129791, 165.1 mm SL C P. multisquamata, holotype, MNHN-IC-2008-1516, 167.3 mm SL. White line indicates anus.

Conservation status
- Data Deficient (IUCN 3.1)

Scientific classification
- Kingdom: Animalia
- Phylum: Chordata
- Class: Actinopterygii
- Order: Perciformes
- Family: Bembridae
- Genus: Parabembras
- Species: P. robinsoni

Binomial name
- Parabembras robinsoni Regan, 1921

= Parabembras robinsoni =

Species of fish

Parabembras robinsoni, the African deep-water flathead, is a species of marine ray-finned fish belonging to the family Bembridae, the deepwater flatheads. It is found in Western Indian Ocean off southeastern Africa.

== Taxonomy ==
Parabembras robinsoni was first formally described as Brembras curtus in 1921 by the British ichthyologist Charles Tate Regan with its type locality given as 24 to 35 km (15 to 22 mi) off Umvoti River mouth in KwaZulu-Natal, South Africa. The genus Parabembras is sufficiently different from the other genera in that family to be classified as their own family, Parabembradidae, by some authorities. The specific name robinsoni honours John Benjamin Romer Robinson, a South African angler, lawyer and businessman, who gave the type to the British Museum (Natural History).

== Description ==
Parabembras robinsoni has a head and body which is reddish orange and white ventrally. Fins red in colour with pale reddish interradial membranes. A symphyseal knob on the lower jaw present, which is the clear difference from Parabembras curta. Two preocular spine and single robust lachrymal spines present. There are 6–8 supraocular spines, 11 spines in the first dorsal fin. Body cylindrical and posteriorly moderately compressed. Scales ctenoid. Mouth large and slightly oblique. This species has a maximum published total length of 24 cm (9.4 in).

== Distribution and habitat ==
Parabembras robinsoni is found in the southwestern Indian Ocean from Mozambique to Durban. It is a bathydemersal species found at depths between 200 and 600 m (660 and 1,970 ft).
