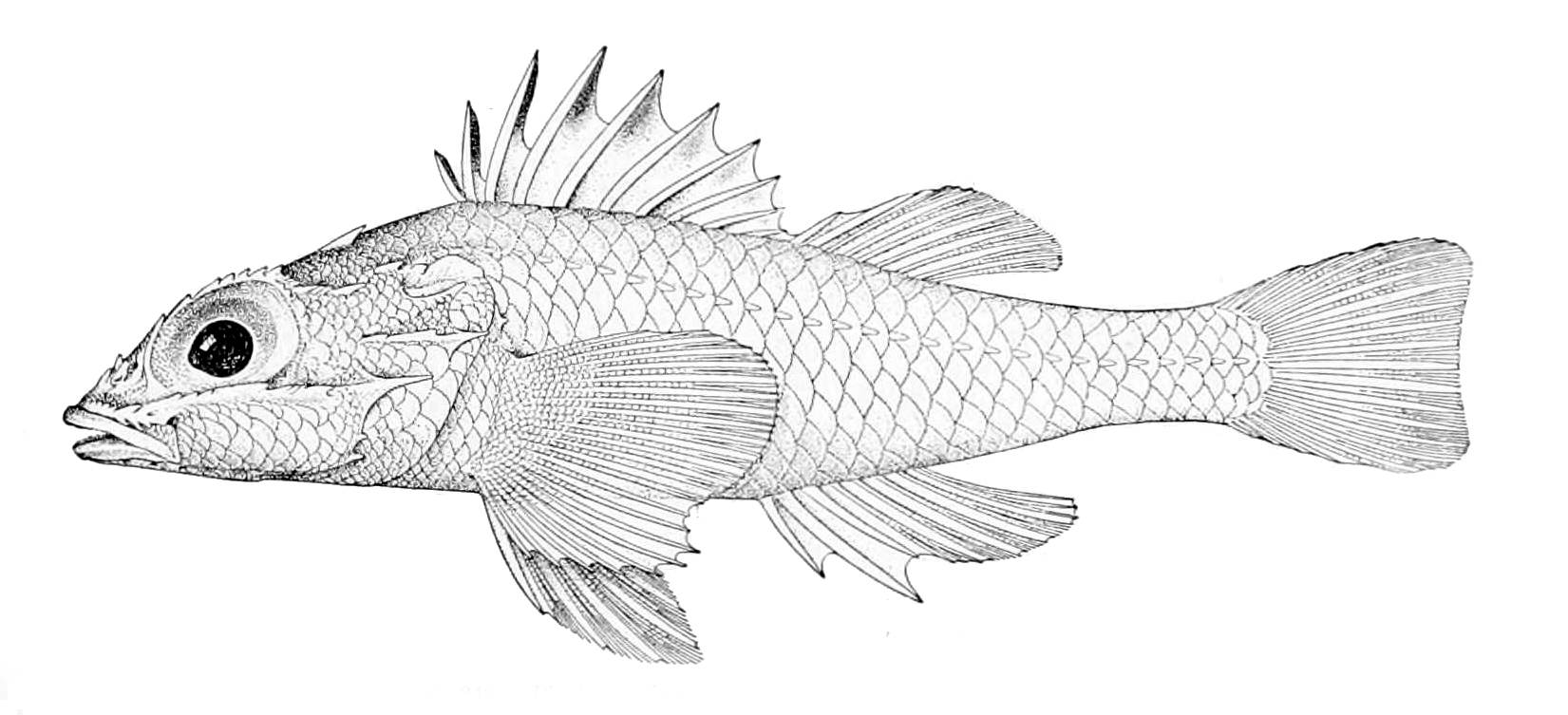
- P. nanum

Scientific classification
- Kingdom: Animalia
- Phylum: Chordata
- Class: Actinopterygii
- Order: Perciformes
- Family: Plectrogeniidae
- Genus: Plectrogenium; C. H. Gilbert, 1905

Type species
- Plectrogenium nanum Gilbert, 1905

= Plectrogenium =

Genus of fishes

Plectrogenium, is a genus of marine ray-finned fishes, the stinger flatheads in the family Plectrogeniidae. This genus is found in the Indian and Pacific Oceans.

== Taxonomy ==
Plectrogenium was originally named as a monotypic genus in 1905 by the American ichthyologist Charles Henry Gilbert when he described what was then considered to be its only species, Plectrogenium nanum, from Hawaii. The genus name, Plectrogenium, is a compound of plectro, which means "spur", and genys, which means "cheek" or "chin", an allusion to the lines of robust spines along the sides of the head.

== Species ==
The currently recognized species in this genus are:

- Plectrogenium barsukovi Mandritsa, 1992
- Plectrogenium capricornis Matsunuma, Uesaka, Yamakawa & Endo, 2021
- Plectrogenium kamoharai Uesaka, Yamakawa, Matsunuma & Endo, 2021
- Plectrogenium kanayamai Uesaka, Yamakawa, Matsunuma & Endo, 2021
- Plectrogenium longipinnis Matsunuma, Uesaka, Yamakawa & Endo, 2021
- Plectrogenium megalops Matsunuma, Uesaka, Yamakawa & Endo, 2021
- Plectrogenium nanum C. H. Gilbert, 1905
- Plectrogenium occidentalise Matsunuma, Uesaka, Yamakawa & Endo, 2021
- Plectrogenium rubricauda Matsunuma, Uesaka, Yamakawa & Endo, 2021
- Plectrogenium serratum Matsunuma, Uesaka, Yamakawa & Endo, 2021

== Characteristics ==
Plectrogenium is characterised by having a laterally compressed body with a number of spines and ridges on the head. There are venom glands on the spines in the dorsal, anal and pelvic fins. The dorsal fin typically has 12 spines and 7^{1}/_{2} soft rays, the dorsal fin is split into 2 fins with 2 spines in the anterior part of the second dorsal fin. There are between 22 and 25 rays in the pectoral fins and they have 30-35 vertical rows of ctenoid scales on the body. There are flattened spines on the suborbital ridge which resembles that of the Platycephalidae. The mouth is positioned ventrally. They are small fishes with standard lengths of less than 10 cm (3.9 in)

== Distribution and habitat ==
Plectrogenium is found in the Indian and Pacific Oceans from Madagascar to Hawaii. They are bathydemersal fishes which are found at depths greater than 250 m (820 ft).
