= Neosalangichthys =

Scientific classification
- Kingdom: Animalia
- Phylum: Chordata
- Class: Actinopterygii
- Order: Osmeriformes
- Family: Salangidae
- Genus: Neosalangichthys; C. Z. Fu, L. Guo, R. Xia, Jun Li & G. C. Lei, 2012
- Species: N. ishikawae

Binomial name
- Neosalangichthys ishikawae (Wakiya & N. Takahashi, 1913)

Synonyms
- Salangichthys ishikawae Wakiya & N. Takahashi, 1913

Genus of fishes

Neosalangichthys ishikawae, the Ishikawa icefish, is a species of Salangidae that is endemic to marine waters near the coast in northern Honshu, Japan. Originally placed in the genus Salangichthys, the species was assigned in 2012 to the monotypic genus Neosalangichthys. Adults stay in relatively shallow open marine waters, but larve and immatures typically stay off beaches, often in the surf zone, in waters that range from marine to brackish. Unlike the more widespread S. microdon with which it often occurs, N. ishikawae does not occur in fresh water.

This species reaches up to 7.4 cm (2.9 in) in standard length, and six adult females with eggs had a total length of 6.3–6.8 cm (2.5–2.7 in). Despite the small size, both this species and S. microdon are caught in commercial fisheries.
