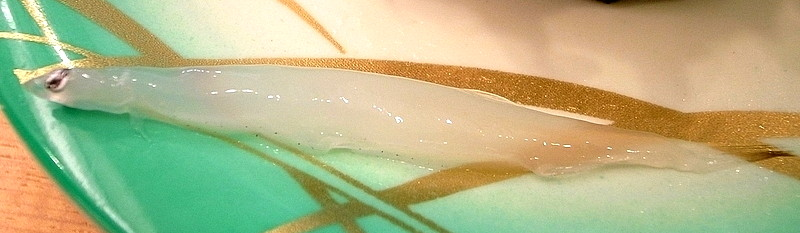

Scientific classification
- Kingdom: Animalia
- Phylum: Chordata
- Class: Actinopterygii
- Order: Osmeriformes
- Family: Salangidae
- Genus: Salangichthys; Bleeker, 1860
- Species: S. microdon

Binomial name
- Salangichthys microdon (Bleeker, 1860)

= Salangichthys =

Genus of fishes

Salangichthys microdon is a species of icefish found in Japan, Korea and the Russian Far East. With the recent removal of S. ishikawae to the genus Neosalangichthys this species is the only remaining member of the genus Salangichthys. This species grows to a total length of 5 cm (2.0 in). Despite its small size, it is considered a food fish and caught in commercial fisheries.

Salangichthys microdon may show both migratory (anadromous; adults in salt water but moving to fresh water to breed) and non-migratory (always in brackish or fresh water) life histories, with both types periodically occurring together.

== As food ==
In Japan, the fish is known as shirauo (白魚 or シラウオ, "white fish"). It is often eaten raw as sashimi and sushi.

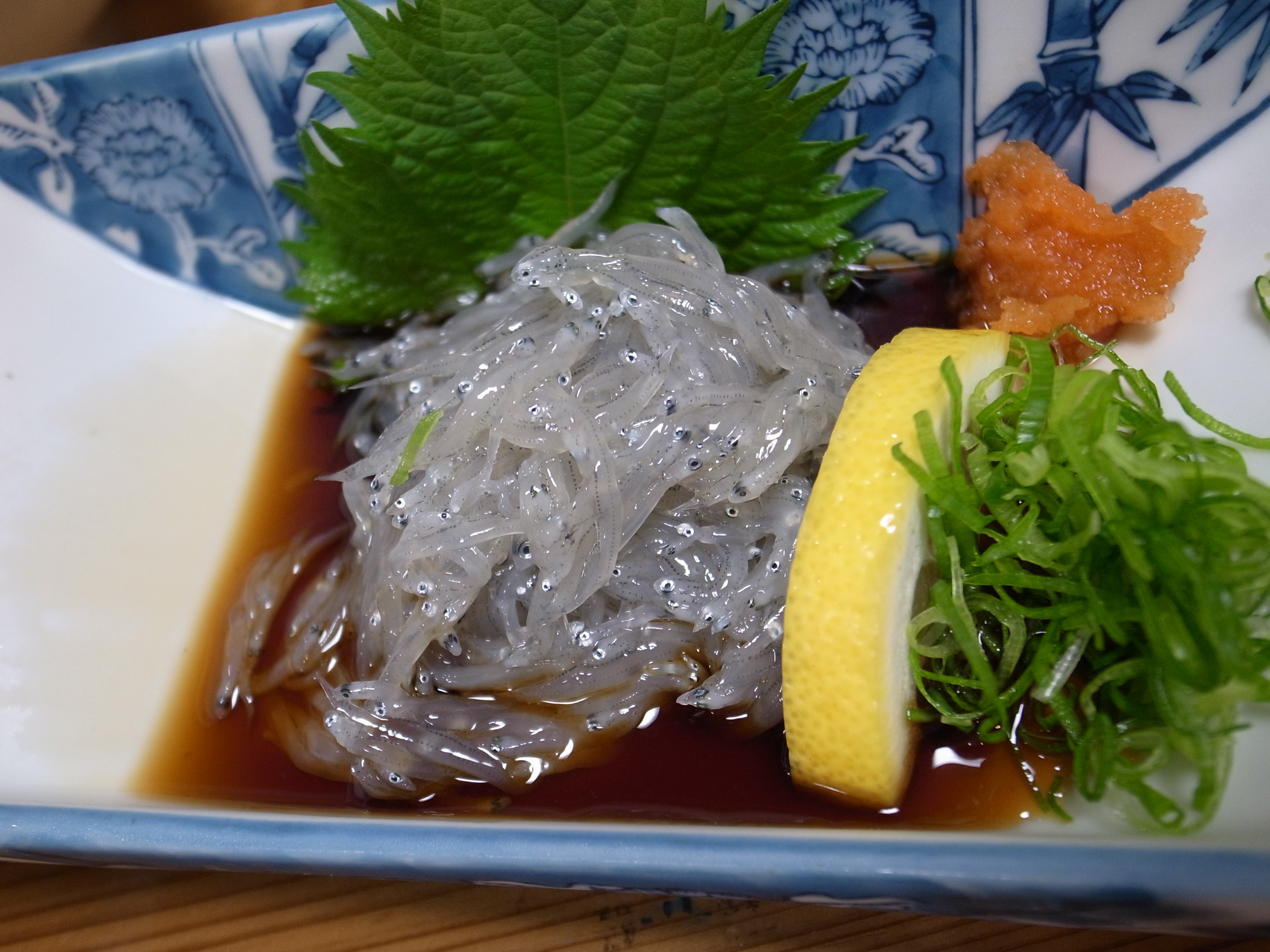
Icefish sashimi

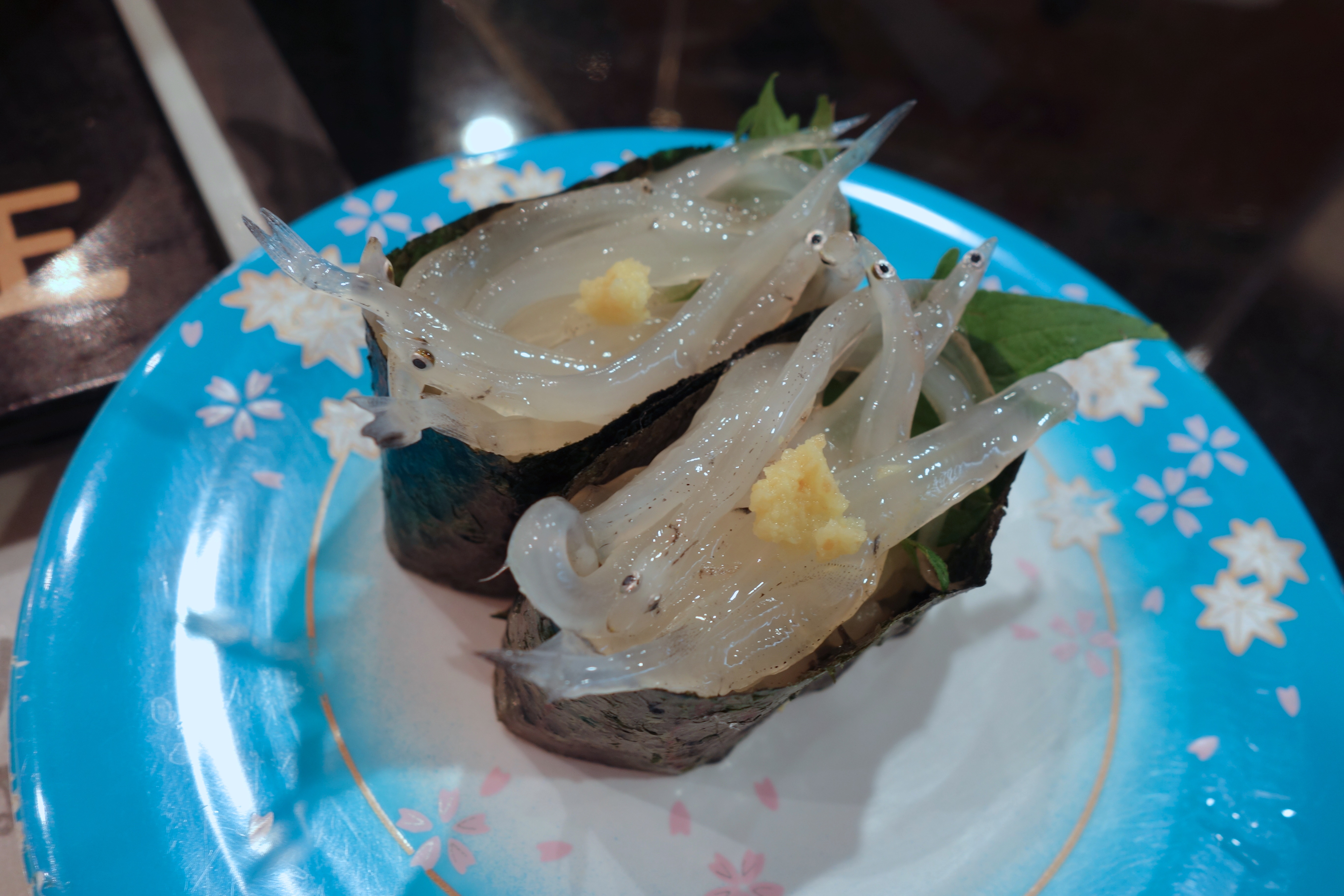
Icefish sushi
