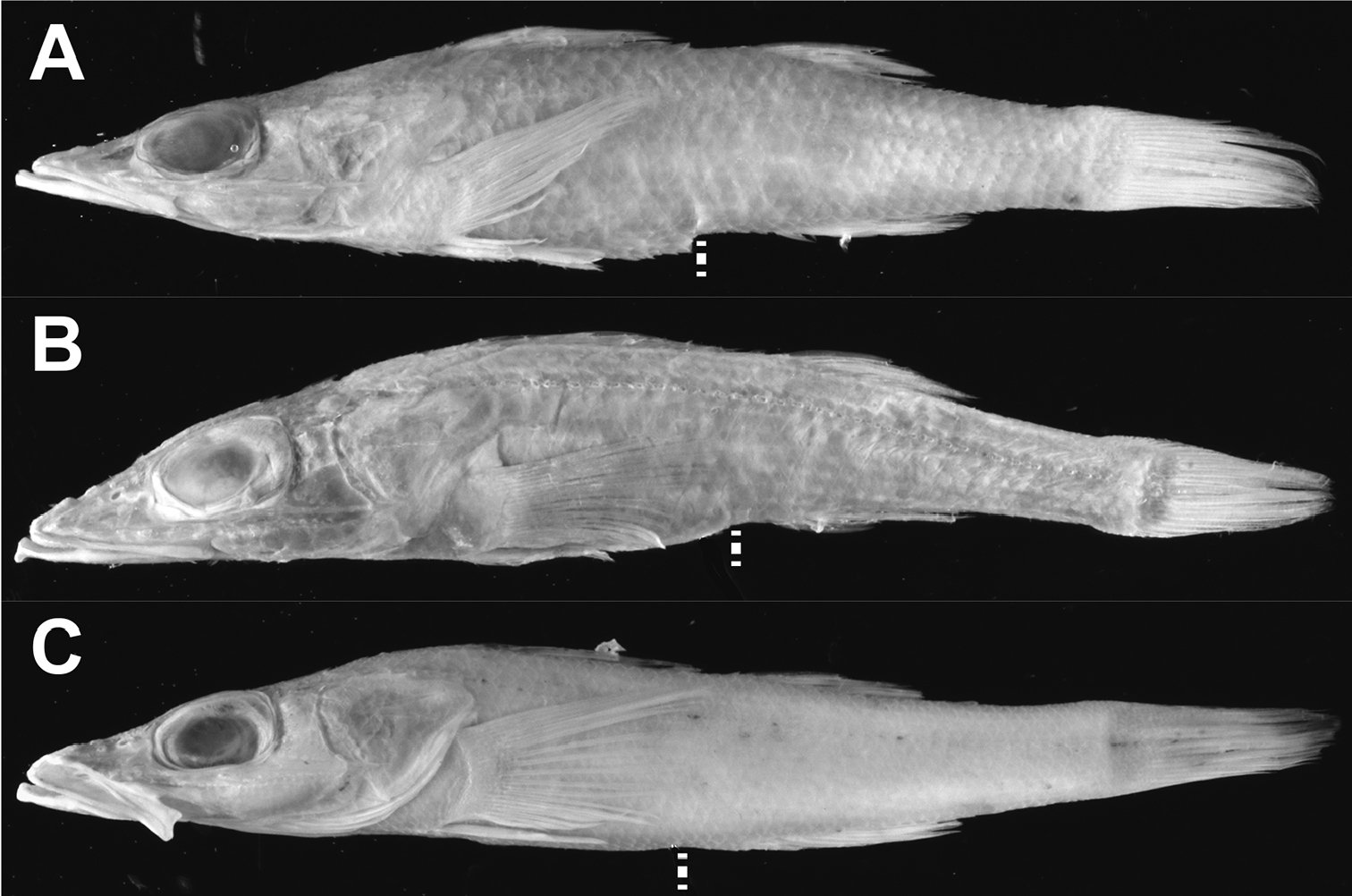
- Lateral view of the three species of Parabembras; A P. curta, FAKU 41447, 143.5 mm SL B P. robinsoni, NSMT-P 129791, 165.1 mm SL C P. multisquamata, holotype, MNHN-IC-2008-1516, 167.3 mm SL. White line indicates anus.

Scientific classification
- Kingdom: Animalia
- Phylum: Chordata
- Class: Actinopterygii
- Order: Perciformes
- Family: Bembridae
- Genus: Parabembras; Bleeker, 1874

Type species
- Bembras curtus Temminck & Schlegel, 1843

= Parabembras =

Genus of fishes

Parabembras is a genus of marine ray-finned fish belonging to the family Bembridae, the deepwater flatheads, although they are sufficiently different from the other genera in that family to be classified as their own family, Parabembradidae, by some authorities. These fishes are found in the Indian Ocean and the western Pacific Ocean.

== Taxonomy ==
Parabembras was first described as a genus in 1874 by the Dutch physician, herpetologist and ichthyologist Pieter Bleeker as a monotypic genus with its only species being Bembras curtus. which had been described in 1843 by Temminck and Schlegel from Nagasaki. The 5th edition of Fishes of the World places Parabembras in the family Bembridae with the other deepwater flatheads but other authorities classify it within its own monotypic family, the Parabembradidae. Parabembradidae was first proposed as a family in 1925, with the name then being Parabembridae, by the American ichthyologists David Starr Jordan and Carl Leavitt Hubbs.

=== Species ===
The currently recognized species in this genus are: with a new species described in 2018.

- Parabembras curta (Temminck & Schlegel, 1843) - northwestern Pacific
- Parabembras multisquamata Kai, Fricke, 2018 - southwestern Pacific and the Philippines
- Parabembras robinsoni Regan, 1921 (African deep-water flathead) - southwestern Indian Ocean

=== Etymology ===
Parabembras combines para, meaning "near", with Bembras, the type genus of the Bembridae and the original genus of P. curta.

== Characteristics ==
Parabembras differs from the other Bembrid genera by having 3 spines in the anal fin whereas the others have none. The lower jaw protrudes past the lower and the maxilla is narrow to its rear. These flatheads vary in size from P. curta, which has a maximum published standard length of 15.1 cm (5.9 in), to P. robinsoni, which has a maximum published total length of 24 cm (9.4 in).

== Distribution and habitat ==
Parabembras deepwater flatheads are found in the southwestern Indian Ocean and the Western Pacific Ocean. They are demersal to bathydemersal fishes living down to depths of 600 m (2,000 ft).
