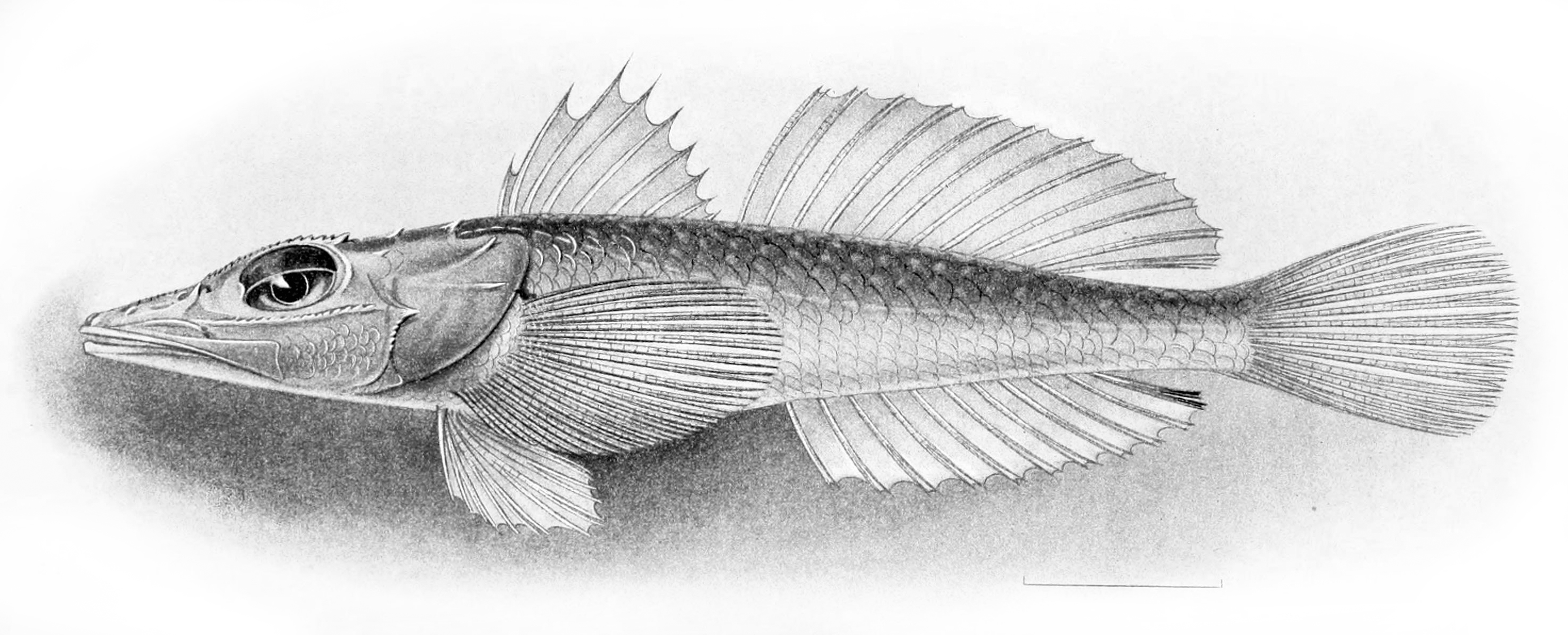
- B. roseum

Scientific classification
- Kingdom: Animalia
- Phylum: Chordata
- Class: Actinopterygii
- Order: Perciformes
- Family: Plectrogeniidae
- Genus: Bembradium; C. H. Gilbert, 1905

Type species
- Bembradium roseum Gilbert, 1905

= Bembradium =

Genus of fishes

Bembradium is a genus of marine ray-finned fish belonging to the family Plectrogeniidae, the stinger flatheads. These fishes are found in the Indian Ocean and the western Pacific Ocean.

== Taxonomy ==
Bembradium was first proposed as a genus by the American ichthyologist Charles Henry Gilbert in 1905 when he described the new species, Bembradium roseum, from the Pailolo channel in the Hawaiian Islands. He designated his new species as the type species of the new monotypic genus. Subsequently the French ichthyologists Pierre Fourmanoir and Jacques Rivaton described a second species, B. furici, from the Isle of Pines in the Province Sud on Grande Terre in New Caledonia in 1979. In 2019 a third species was described from the Andaman Sea. In the 5th edition of Fishes of the World the genus is classified within the family Bembridae, the deep water flatheads. More recent studies suggest that this genus actually belongs to the family Plectrogeniidae, and it is now treated as such.

=== Species ===
There are currently 3 recognized species in this genus:

- Bembradium furici Fourmanoir & Rivaton, 1979
- Bembradium magnoculum Kishimoto, Kawai, Tashiro & Aungtonya, 2019
- Bembradium roseum C. H. Gilbert, 1905

=== Etymology ===
The genus name means "like Bembras", the type genus of Bembridae.

== Characteristics ==
Bembradium is diagnosed as a genus by the front part of the head behind very flattened, becoming less flattened to the rear. The lower jaw does not protrude. The suborbital ridge bears many spines. The origin of the pectoral fins is behind a vertical line through the origin of the pelvic fins. The lateral line runs through the centre of the flanks. The scales on the body are large. These are small fishes in which the maximum published standard length is around 11.5 cm (4.5 in).

== Distribution and habitat ==
Bembradium stinger flatheads are found in the Indo-Pacific region from the Andaman Sea to Hawaii. They are found in deep water.
