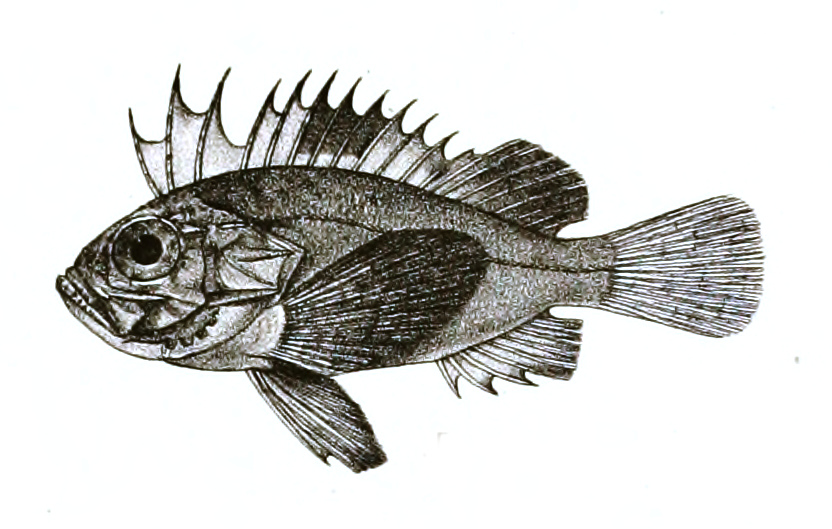

Conservation status
- Data Deficient (IUCN 3.1)

Scientific classification
- Kingdom: Animalia
- Phylum: Chordata
- Class: Actinopterygii
- Order: Perciformes
- Family: Synanceiidae
- Genus: Pseudovespicula; Mandritsa, 2001
- Species: P. dracaena

Binomial name
- Pseudovespicula dracaena (G. Cuvier, 1829)

Synonyms
- Apistus dracaena Cuvier, 1829; Vespicula dracaena (Cuvier, 1829); Vespicula dracaene (Cuvier, 1829)

= Pseudovespicula dracaena =

Species of fish

Pseudovespicula dracaena, the draco waspfish, is a species of marine ray-finned fish, a waspfish belonging to the subfamily Tetraroginae, which is classified as part of the family Scorpaenidae, the scorpionfishes and their relatives. This species is native to the western Indian Ocean. This species grows to a length of 7.5 centimetres (3.0 in) TL. This species is regarded as the only known member of its genus by some authorities, while others include 2 other species in that genus.
