= Hoplichthys prosemion =

Scientific classification
- Kingdom: Animalia
- Phylum: Chordata
- Class: Actinopterygii
- Order: Perciformes
- Family: Hoplichthyidae
- Genus: Hoplichthys
- Species: H. prosemion

Binomial name
- Hoplichthys prosemion (Fowler, 1938)

Synonyms
- Monhoplichthys prosemion Fowler, 1938

Species of fish

Hoplichthys prosemion is a species of marine ray-finned fish of the family Hoplichthyidae, the ghost flatheads. This species is found in the marine waters around the Philippines where it has been recorded at a depth of 216 metres (709 ft).
