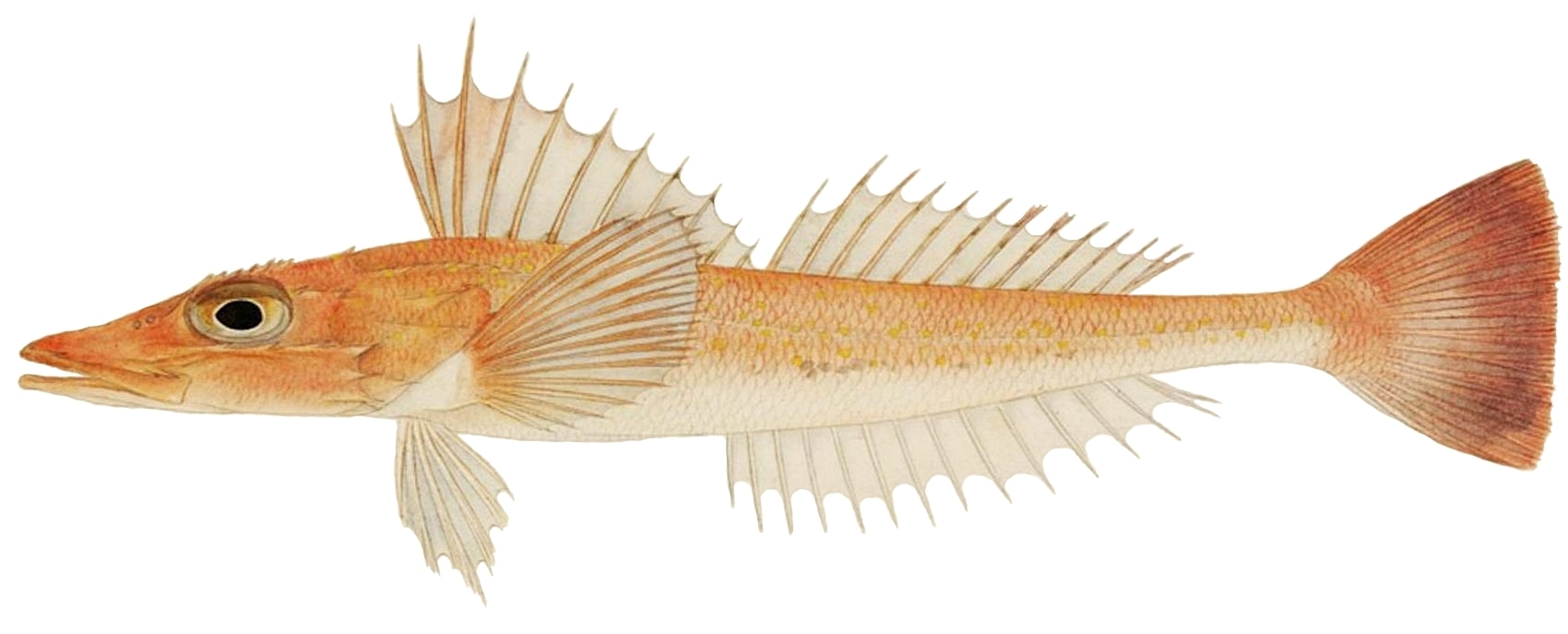
- Bembras japonica

Scientific classification
- Kingdom: Animalia
- Phylum: Chordata
- Class: Actinopterygii
- Order: Perciformes
- Suborder: Scorpaenoidei
- Family: Bembridae; Kaup, 1873

Genera
- see text

= Bembridae =

Family of fishes

Bembridae, the deep-water flatheads, are a family of bottom-dwelling ray-finned fishes. They are found in the Indian and western Pacific Oceans.

== Taxonomy ==
Bembridae was first proposed as a family in 1873 by the German zoologist Johann Jakob Kaup. The 5th edition of Fishes of the World classifies this family within the suborder Platycephaloidei in the order Scorpaeniformes. Other authorities differ and do not consider the Scorpaeniformes to be a valid order because the Perciformes is not monophyletic without the taxa within the Scorpaeniformes being included within it. These authorities consider the Bembridae to belong to the suborder Platycephaloidei, along with the families Parabembridae, Hoplichthyidae, Platycephalidae and Plectrogeniidae within the Perciformes. This family is thought to be more primitive than their close relatives, the true flatheads. Despite the common name, their heads are only slightly flattened and have spiny ridges.

=== Genera ===
Bembridae contains 4 recognised genera:

- Bambradon D.S. Jordan & R.E. Richardson, 1908
- Bembras Cuvier, 1829
- Brachybembras Fowler. 1938
- Parabembras Bleeker, 1874

The genus Bembradium, previously placed in here, is now known to belong to the family Plectrogeniidae. Other authorities classify the genus Parabembras within the monotypic family Parabembridae.

=== Etymology ===
Bembridae derives its name from its type genus Bembras which was coined by the French zoologist Georges Cuvier in 1829 but he did not explain its etymology. However, it is thought that it may come from an ancient Greek word for some sort of small fish, such as anchovy, sprat or smelt. which at least dates as far back as Aristotle. Cuvier applied this type of name to other genera he put forward, such as Synodontis, Salanx or Premnas.

== Characteristics ==
Benbridae deepwater flatheads have large, flattened heads with elongated subcylindrical bodies which have not spiny scutes. The eyes are moderately large without an iris lapit or ocular flaps. The infraorbital bones form a clear, robust ridge, joining the uppermost preopercular spine and has between 4 and 6 spines on it. The spines on the head are short to moderate with between 8 and 11 above the eye. There are two separate dorsal fins, the first contains between 6 and 12 spines and the second between 8 and 12 soft rays while there are 3 spines in the anal fin. There are no separate rays in the pectoral fins. Although the colour is typically red red, orange, or light brown; some species have green, dark green or blackish spotting or blotching on their body and fins and the anal fin may be almost black. The largest member is the bigscale flathead (Bembras macrolepis), which reaches a standard length of 27.3 cm (10.7 in).

== Distribution and habitat ==
Bembridae deep-water flatheads have an Indo-Pacific distribution and are mainly found in the South China Sea, the Gulf of Aden, and the waters near Southern Indonesia and Australia. These are benthic fishes of the continental shelf at depths of 80 to 581 m (262 to 1,906 ft).
