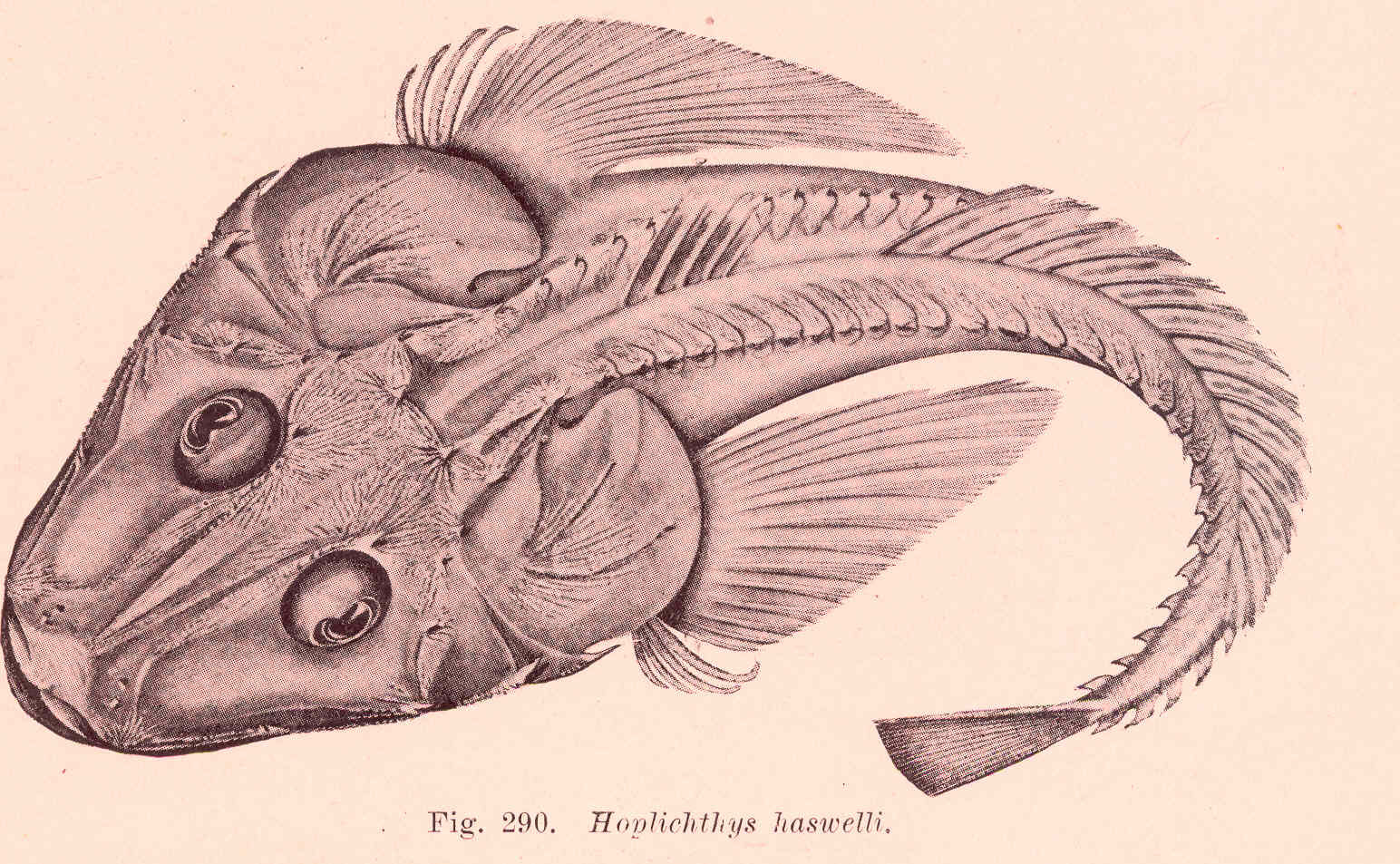

Scientific classification
- Kingdom: Animalia
- Phylum: Chordata
- Class: Actinopterygii
- Order: Perciformes
- Family: Hoplichthyidae
- Genus: Hoplichthys
- Species: H. haswelli

Binomial name
- Hoplichthys haswelli McCulloch, 1907

Synonyms
- Rhinhoplichthys haswelli (McCulloch, 1907)

= Armoured flathead =

Species of fish

The armoured flathead (Hoplichthys haswelli), also known as the deepsea flathead, glassy flathead or spiny flathead, is a species of marine ray-finned fish of the family Hoplichthyidae, the ghost flatheads. This species is found in the southwest Pacific Ocean.

== Taxonomy ==
The armoured flathead was first formally described in 1907 By the Australian ichthyologist Allan Riverstone McCulloch with the type locality given as "35 miles east of Port Jackson, New South Wales, Australia, depth 800 fathoms". The specific name honours Scots-born Australian zoologist William Aitcheson Haswell, who led the expedition on which the type specimen was obtained.

== Description ==
The armoured flathead has a highly flattened, broad head and an elongated depressed body. There is a row of spiny, bony plates called scutes running along the flanks from the head to the caudal peduncle. The side of the head is armed with four robust spines and thee have smaller spines between them. The first dorsal fin contains 5, rarely 6, spines, the second dorsal fin is separated from the first and contains 13 or 14 soft rays. The anal fin has a single spine and between 15 and 17 soft rays. This species has a maximum published total length of 43 cm (17 in). The overall colour is pale reddish-pink on the upper head and body and whitish ventrally. The pelvic fins are white and the other fins are pinkish with the pectoral and second dorsal fins having dark spots. There caudal fin has a dark margin.

== Distribution and habitat ==
The armoured flat head is found in the southwestern Pacific Ocean from Australia and New Zealand. In Australia it is found southern Queensland to Eucla, Western Australia on the Great Australian Bight. In New Zealand it is widespread but rare on the Campbell Plateau. This is a demersal fish that is found on soft substrates on the continental shelf and continental slope at depths between 200 and 1,500 m (660 and 4,920 ft).

== Biology ==
Armoured flatheads feed on fishes and decapod crustaceans.

== Fisheries ==
Armoured flatheads are not targeted by commercial fisheries, despite being reputed to have highly palatable flesh, because the amount of edible muscle is too small even in the larger specimens.
