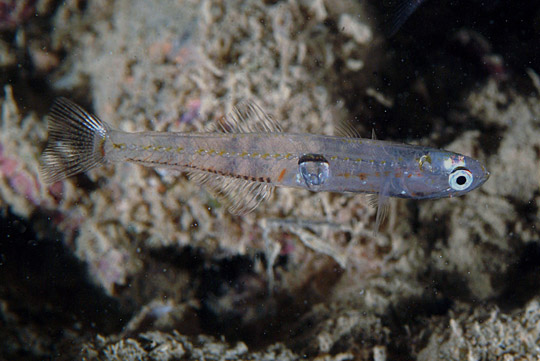

Scientific classification
- Kingdom: Animalia
- Phylum: Chordata
- Class: Actinopterygii
- Division: Teleostei
- Order: Gobiiformes
- Family: Gobiidae
- Genus: Aphia; Risso, 1827
- Species: A. minuta

Binomial name
- Aphia minuta (A. Risso, 1810)

Synonyms
- (for the genus): Aphyogobius Whitley, 1931; Boreogobius T. N. Gill, 1863; Brachyochirus Nardo, 1844; Latrunculus Günther, 1861; (for the species): Atherina minuta A. Risso, 1810; Argentina aphia Rafinesque, 1810 (Ambiguous name); Gobius pellucidus Nardo, 1824; Aphya pellucida (Nardo, 1824); Brachyochirus pellucidus (Nardo, 1824); Aphia meridionalis A. Risso, 1827; Gobius albus Parnell, 1831–37; Gobius stuvitzii Düben, 1845; Brachyochirus aphya Bonaparte, 1846; Gobius pellucidus Kessler, 1859 (Ambiguous name)

= Transparent goby =

Transparent goby Temporal range: Middle Miocene to present

Species of fish

Aphia minuta, the transparent goby, is a species of the goby native to the northeastern Atlantic Ocean where it can be found from Trondheim, Norway to Morocco. It is also found in the Mediterranean, Black Sea and the Sea of Azov. It is a pelagic species, inhabiting inshore waters and estuaries. It can be found at depths of from the surface to 97 metres (318 ft), though it is usually found at 5 to 80 metres (16 to 262 ft), over sandy and muddy bottoms and also in eelgrass beds. This species can reach a length of 7.9 centimetres (3.1 in) TL. It is an important species to local commercial fisheries. It is currently the only known extant member of its genus. A fossil relative, †Aphia macrophthalma Schwarzhans et al., 2016 is known from the Middle Miocene of Serbia.

== Gastronomy ==
This fish is appreciated in Spain as part of the Andalusian, Catalan and Valencian cuisines, and in Italy as part of the Italian cuisine. In Andalusia where they are called chanquetes, they are traditionally served deep-fried, with fried eggs and roasted or fried bell pepper. Due to their high price and to their now protected species status in Spain, they are often replaced by some species of East Asian noodlefishes, locally called chanquete chino (Chinese chanquete), Neosalanx tangkahkeii and Protosalanx. This replacement is often done openly, but sometimes it is done fraudulently.
