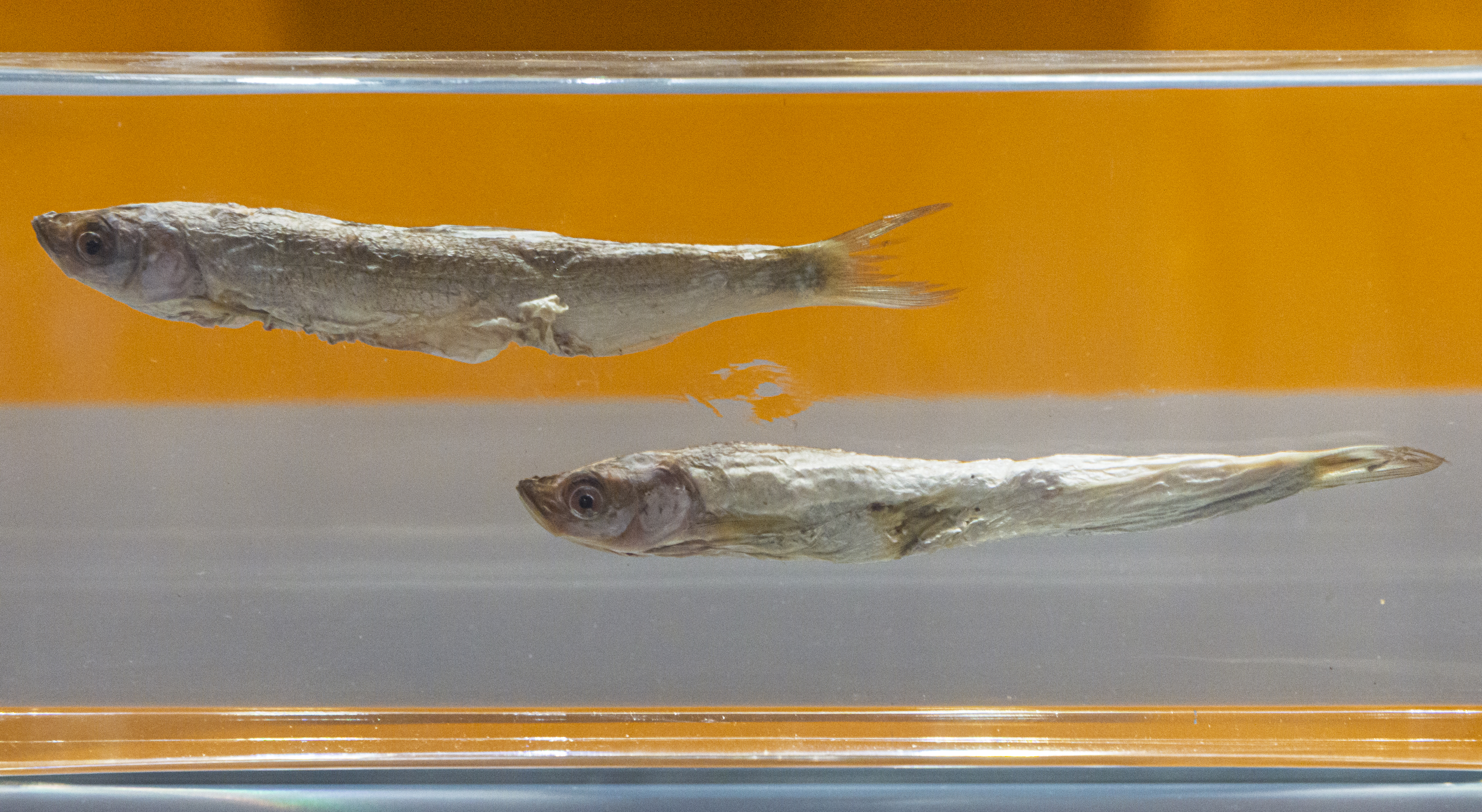

Conservation status
- Vulnerable (IUCN 3.1)

Scientific classification
- Kingdom: Animalia
- Phylum: Chordata
- Class: Actinopterygii
- Division: Teleostei
- Order: Cypriniformes
- Suborder: Cyprinoidei
- Family: Xenocyprididae
- Genus: Anabarilius
- Species: A. graham

Binomial name
- Anabarilius graham (Regan, 1908)

Synonyms
- Barilius grahami Regan, 1908; Ischikauia grahami (Regan, 1908)

= Kanglang fish =

Species of fish

The Kanglang fish (Anabarilius grahami) is a species of freshwater ray-finned fish belonging to the family Xenocyprididae, the East Asian minnows or sharpbellies. It is a pelagic species endemic to Fuxian Lake in Yunnan, southern China. However, the species may now be in the process of extinction because of the introduced noodlefish Neosalanx taihuensis, with which it is competing for food.
