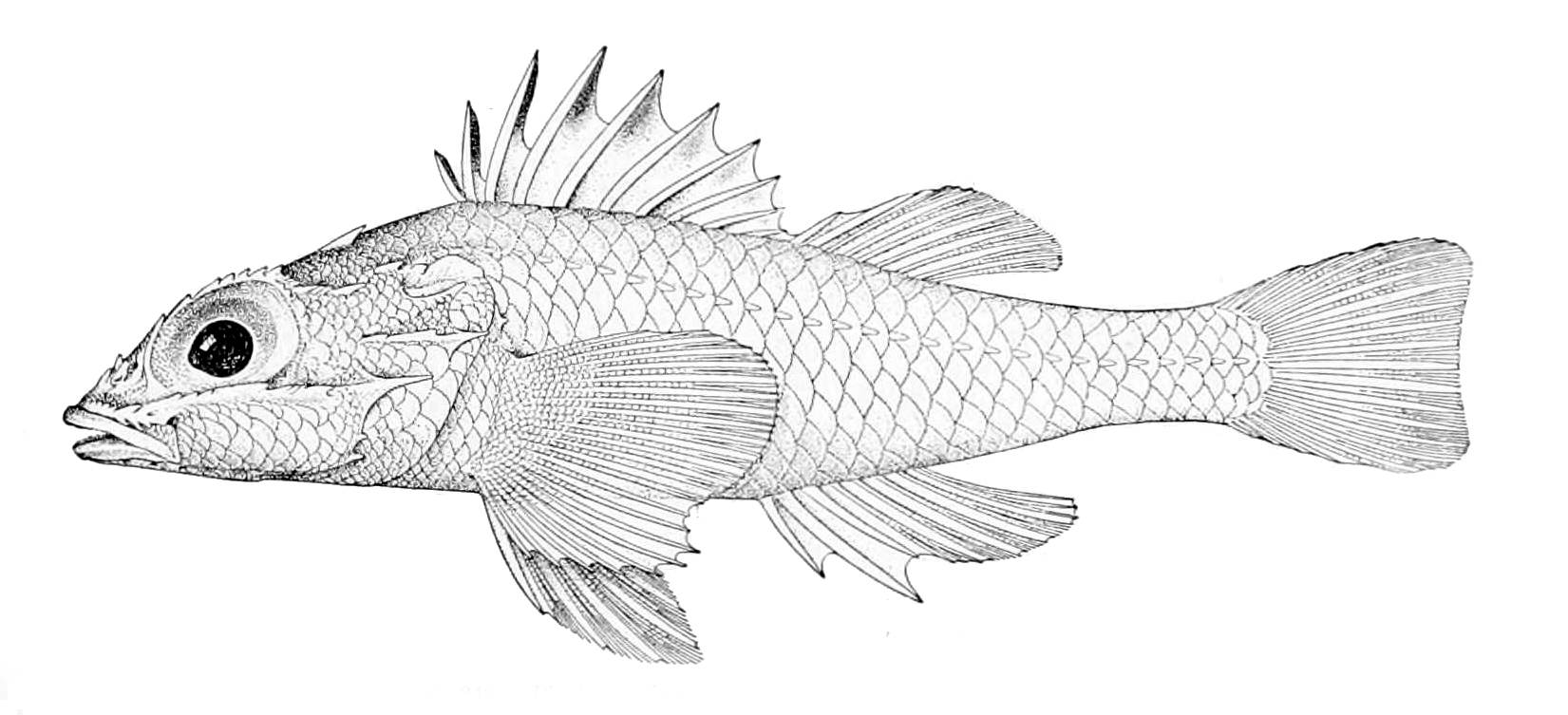
- Plectrogenium nanum

Scientific classification
- Kingdom: Animalia
- Phylum: Chordata
- Class: Actinopterygii
- Order: Perciformes
- Suborder: Scorpaenoidei
- Family: Plectrogeniidae; Fowler, 1938

Genera
- Bembradium; Plectrogenium

= Plectrogeniidae =

Plectrogeniidae, the stinger flatheads, are a family of ray-finned fishes in the suborder Scorpaenoidei.

It was formerly considered a subfamily of Scorpaenidae, but more recent phylogenetic studies support it being treated as its own family. It is recognized as such by Eschmeyer's Catalog of Fishes.

== Genera ==
The following genera are placed in this family:

- Bembradium Gilbert, 1905
- Plectrogenium Gilbert, 1905

Until a 2018 phylogenetic study identified the relationship between these two genera, Bembradium was placed within the Bembridae, while Plectrogenium was placed in its own subfamily in the Scorpaenidae.
