= Neosalanx =

Scientific classification
- Kingdom: Animalia
- Phylum: Chordata
- Class: Actinopterygii
- Order: Osmeriformes
- Family: Salangidae
- Genus: Neosalanx; Wakiya & N. Takahashi, 1937

Genus of fishes

Neosalanx is a genus of icefishes native to Eastern Asia, ranging from Korea, through Japan and China, to Vietnam. They inhabit coastal marine waters, estuaries and river basins (including lakes). There are both species that are threatened and species that are widespread.

They are up to 7.9 cm (3.1 in) in standard length. Despite their small size they are important food fish, and for this reason there have been attempts of introducing N. pseudotaihuensis, N. taihuensis and N. tangkahkeii to parts of China where not naturally found. Most of these attempted introductions failed, but some were successful and in these places they are now often the most common fish. Feeding on planktonic crustaceans and tiny fish, they have outcompeted certain native fish like Anabarilius grahami, which have become rare and threatened.

== Species ==
Fishbase currently recognizes 10 species in this genus, though N. taihuensis was found to be invalid during the DNA sequencing:

- Neosalanx anderssoni (Rendahl (de), 1923)
- Neosalanx argentea (S. Y. Lin, 1932)
- Neosalanx brevirostris (Pellegrin, 1923)
- Neosalanx hubbsi Wakiya & N. Takahashi, 1937
- Neosalanx jordani Wakiya & N. Takahashi, 1937
- Neosalanx oligodontis N. S. Chen, 1956
- Neosalanx pseudotaihuensis Y. L. Zhang, 1987
- Neosalanx reganius Wakiya & N. Takahashi, 1937
- Neosalanx tangkahkeii (H. W. Wu, 1931) (Chinese icefish)

== Genome ==
The mitochondrial genome of the Neosalanx is 16550 base pairs long.
