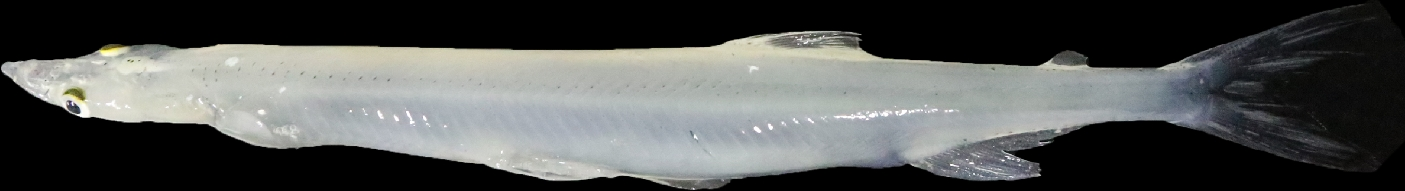
- Protosalanx hyalocranius
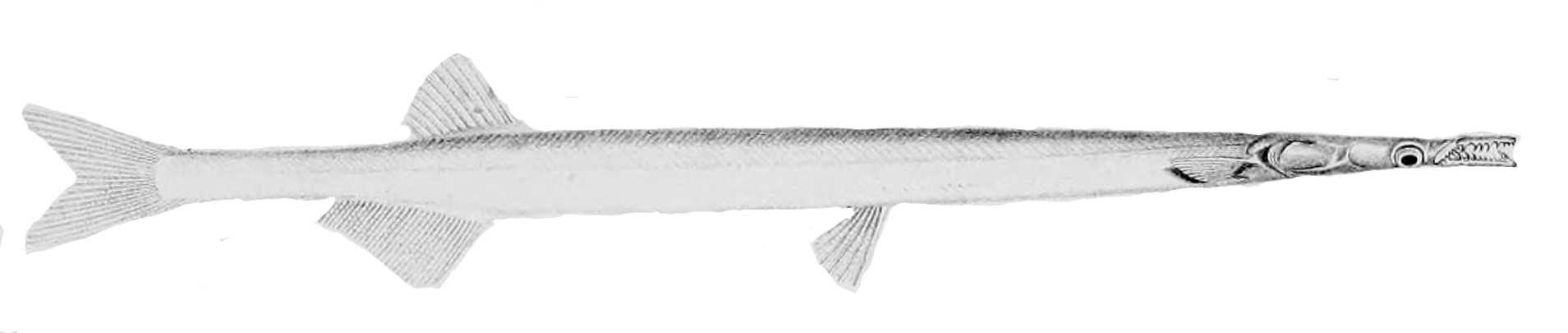
- Salanx chinensis

Scientific classification
- Kingdom: Animalia
- Phylum: Chordata
- Class: Actinopterygii
- Order: Osmeriformes
- Suborder: Osmeroidei
- Family: Salangidae

Genera
- Hemisalanx; Neosalangichthys; Neosalanx; Protosalanx; Salangichthys; Salanx

= Salangidae =

Family of fishes

Salangidae, the icefishes or noodlefishes, are a family of small osmeriform fish, related to the smelts. They are found in Eastern Asia, ranging from the Russian Far East in the north to Vietnam in the south, with the highest species richness in China. Some species are widespread and common, but others have relatively small ranges and are threatened. Depending on species, they inhabit coastal marine, brackish or fresh water habitats, and some are anadromous, only visiting fresh water to spawn.

== Appearance and life cycle ==
They are slender, have translucent or transparent bodies and almost no scales (females are entirely scale-less, while males have a few). The head is strongly depressed and has numerous teeth. The adults are believed to be neotenic, retaining some larval features. For example, the skeleton is not fully ossified, consisting largely of cartilage. They are small fish, typically around 8 cm (3.1 in) long; only a few reach 16 cm (6.3 in), and the largest species no more than 22.5 cm (8.9 in).

Icefish rapidly reach maturity, have a high fecundity and typically only live one year. Some species live in the same habitat throughout their lives, but other visit specific habitats, like rivers, estuaries or the surf zone, to lay their eggs. In at least Salangichthys microdon there are both populations that are resident and populations that are anadromous.

== As food and introduced species ==
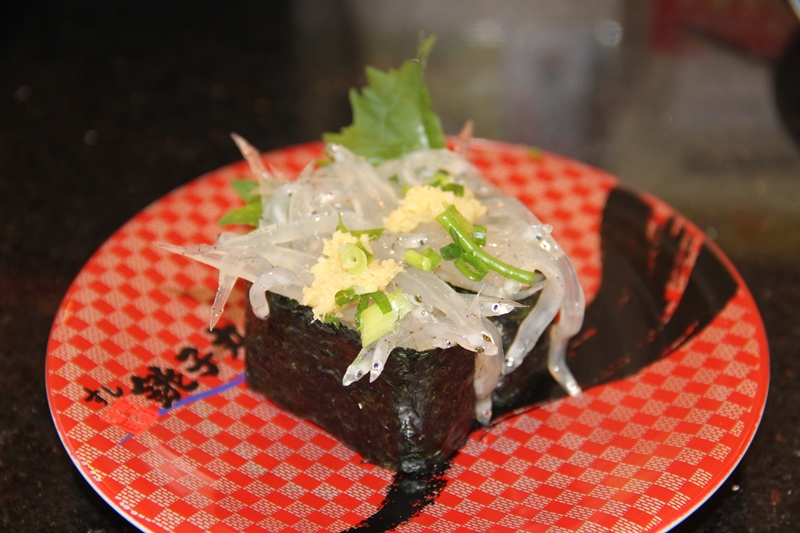
Japanese sushi with Salangichthys microdon (shirauo)

Icefish support important fisheries and are eaten in East Asia, often after being dried or cooked. They are also exported to southern Europe for use as a replacement for the more expensive transparent goby, a Mediterranean species used in the local cuisine.

Because of their value as food fish, there have been many attempts of introducing icefish (especially certain Neosalanx and Protosalanx) to regions in East Asia where not native. Most attempts failed, but several were successful, and in some cases the icefish rapidly multiplied and became the most common fish in their new habitat. Feeding on planktonic crustaceans and tiny fish, they have outcompeted certain native fish like Anabarilius grahami, which have become rare and threatened.

== See also ==
- Sundasalanx, the Sundaland noodlefish, which formerly were included in Salangidae, but now are placed in their own family
