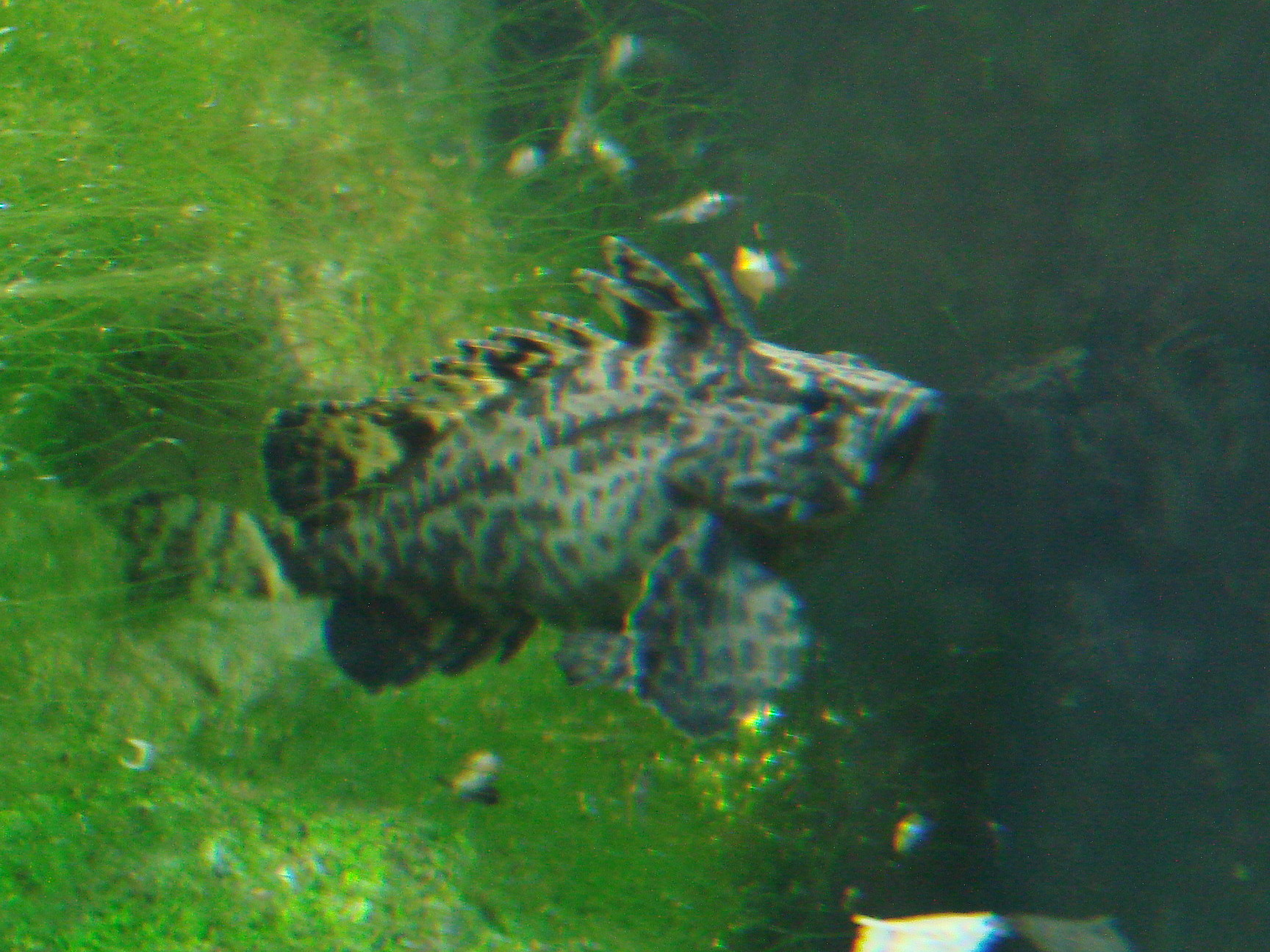

Scientific classification
- Kingdom: Animalia
- Phylum: Chordata
- Class: Actinopterygii
- Order: Perciformes
- Family: Synanceiidae
- Subfamily: Tetraroginae
- Genus: Neovespicula; Mandritsa, 2001
- Species: N. depressifrons

Binomial name
- Neovespicula depressifrons (J. Richardson, 1848)

Synonyms
- Apistes depressifrons Richardson, 1848; Vespicula depressifrons (Richardson, 1848)

= Leaf goblinfish =

Species of fish

The leaf goblinfish (Neovespicula depressifrons) is a species of marine ray-finned fish. A waspfish, it belongs to the subfamily Tetraroginae, which is classified as part of the family Scorpaenidae: the scorpionfishes and their relatives. This is the only species in the monotypic genus Neovespicula. It is found in coastal habitats of the Indo-West Pacific region.

== Taxonomy ==
The leaf goblinfish was first formally described in 1848 as Apistes depressifrons by the Scottish naval surgeon, Arctic explorer and naturalist John Richardson with its type locality given as the Sea of Japan. The genus Neovespicula was described in 2001 by the Russian zoologist Sergey Anatolyevich Mandritsa as a monotypic genus for the leaf goblinfish. This taxon is included in the subfamily Tetraroginae within the Scorpaenidae in the 5th edition of Fishes of the World however other authorities place that subfamily within the stonefish family Synanceiidae, while other authorities classify this subfamily as a family in its own right.

The genus name is a compound of neo, which means "new" and Vespicula, the genus this species had previously been placed in and which derives from Vespa which means "wasp". The specific name combines depressus meaning "pressed down" and frons, which means "brow" or "forehead", an allusion to the low angle of the dorsal profile of the head of this species.

== Morphology ==
The leaf goblinfish is a small species, reaching a maximum size of 10 cm. It is similar to the bullrout in shape and colouration - mottled brown with a distinctive light stripe running along the dorsal surface from the nose and along the back of the fish. It has two dorsal fins, the first being notably taller than the second.

== Distribution ==
The leaf goblinfish has been reported from Indonesia, Papua New Guinea, and the Philippines.

== Ecology ==
The leaf goblinfish, like other waspfishes, is a stealthy predator that feeds on various small fish and invertebrates. Also in common with other waspfish, it is equipped with venomous spines. N. depressifrons is a euryhaline species, so may be found in saltwater, brackish water, and freshwater environments.

== Commercial importance ==
The leaf goblinfish is of no commercial importance, but occasionally gets traded as an aquarium fish. They have the alternative names of freshwater waspfish or phantom goby in the aquarium trade.
