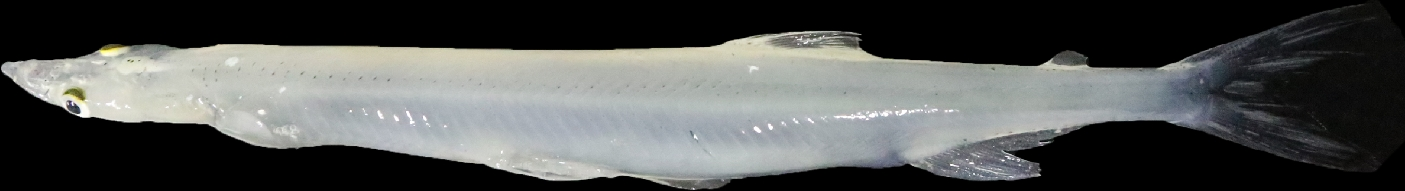
- Protosalanx hyalocranius

Scientific classification
- Kingdom: Animalia
- Phylum: Chordata
- Class: Actinopterygii
- Order: Osmeriformes
- Family: Salangidae
- Genus: Protosalanx; Regan, 1908

= Protosalanx =

Genus of fishes

Protosalanx is a small genus of icefishes that are native to China, Korea and Vietnam where they primarily inhabit coastal waters and nearby fresh waters. They are commercially fished and used for aquaculture in China, where also introduced to some inland waters like Lake Dianchi. In addition to being eaten locally in Asia, they are exported to southern Europe as a replacement of the more expensive transparent goby, a Mediterranean species used in the local cuisine. This replacement is often done openly, but sometimes it is done fraudulently.

Protosalanx are up to 22.5 cm (8.9 in) in standard length, have a transparent body and largely lack scales. They are open-water fish. Small Protosalanx mostly feed on zooplankton, but larger individuals also take small fish, including cannibalism of young of their own species. They are naturally anadromous, with adults migrating from their coastal sea habitat into estuaries to spawn and the juveniles returning to the coastal sea. However, some of the introduced populations have been able to adapt their life cycle and always stay in fresh water.

The scientific name is derived from proto (Greek proto = first) and the latinization of salamga, Filipino for a kind of swallow.

== Species ==
There are currently two recognized species in this genus:

- Protosalanx chinensis (Basilewsky, 1855)
- Protosalanx hyalocranius (J. F. Abbott, 1901) (Clearhead icefish)

== Genome and sex-determination ==
The Protosalanx genome has an estimated size of 525Mb and encodes 19,884 protein-coding genes. Following this initial reference, whole genomes of 20 male and 20 female Protosalanx hyalocranius were sequenced and GWAS analyses were conducted to uncover its sex determination system and putative sex‐determining genes. Indicating a ZZ/ZW sex determination system, and that a "Z dosage" effect might play a vital role.
