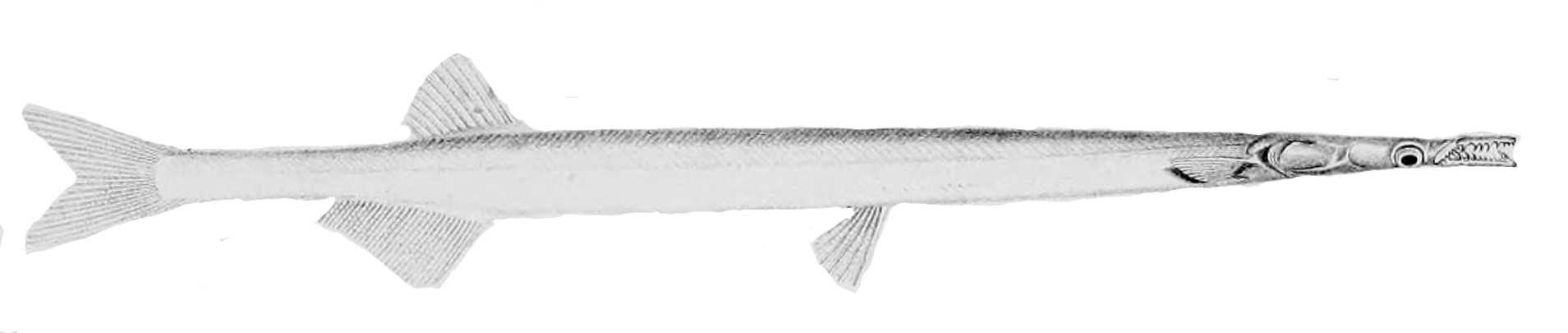
- Chinese noodlefish (Salanx chinensis)

Scientific classification
- Domain: Eukaryota
- Kingdom: Animalia
- Phylum: Chordata
- Class: Actinopterygii
- Order: Osmeriformes
- Family: Salangidae
- Genus: Salanx; G. Cuvier, 1816

= Salanx =

Genus of fishes

Salanx is a genus of icefishes native to Eastern Asia, ranging from Korea and Japan, through China to Vietnam. They are small fish, up to 16.1 cm (6.3 in) in standard length.

== Species ==
There are currently five recognized species in this genus:

- Salanx ariakensis Kishinouye, 1902
- Salanx chinensis (Osbeck, 1765) (Chinese noodlefish)
- Salanx cuvieri Valenciennes, 1850 (Noodlefish)
- Salanx prognathus (Regan, 1908)
- Salanx reevesii (J. E. Gray, 1831)
