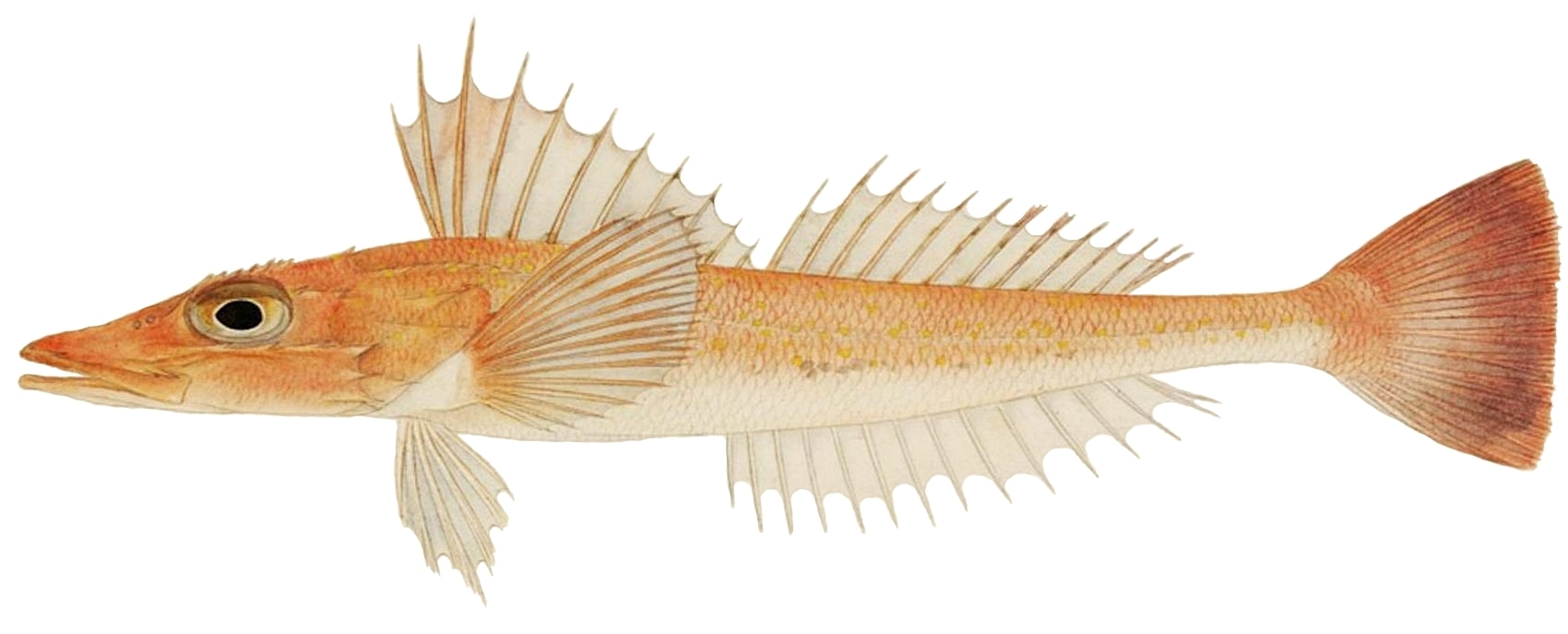
- Bembras japonica

Scientific classification
- Kingdom: Animalia
- Phylum: Chordata
- Class: Actinopterygii
- Order: Perciformes
- Family: Bembridae
- Genus: Bembras; G. Cuvier, 1829

Type species
- Bembras japonicus Cuvier, 1829

= Bembras =

Genus of fishes

Bembras is a genus of marine ray-finned fish belonging to the family Bembridae, the deepwater flatheads. These fishes are found in the Indian Ocean and the western Pacific Ocean.

== Taxonomy ==
Bembras was first proposed as a monotypic genus in 1829 by the French zoologist George Cuvier when he described Bembras japonica from Japan. Cuvier did not explain the etymology of Bembras, however, it is thought that it may come from an ancient Greek word for some sort of small fish, such as anchovy, sprat or smelt. which at least dates as far back as Aristotle. Cuvier applied this type of name to other genera he put forward, such as Synodontis, Salanx or Premnas.

== Species ==
There are currently seven recognized species in this genus:

- Bembras adenensis Imamura & L. W. Knapp, 1997
- Bembras andamanensis Imamura, Psomadakis & Thein, 2018
- Bembras japonica G. Cuvier, 1829
- Bembras leslieknappi Imamura, Psomadakis & Thein, 2018
- Bembras longipinnis Imamura & L. W. Knapp, 1998 (Longfin flathead)
- Bembras macrolepis Imamura, 1998 (Bigscale flathead)
- Bembras megacephala Imamura & L. W. Knapp, 1998 (Greenspotted flathead)

== Characteristics ==
Bembras deepwater flatheads are differentiated from other Bembrid genera by having a lack of spines in the anal fin, a terminal lower jaw which does not protrude beyond the upper jaw and having the maxillae being relatively wide to its rear. They have between 28 and 32 scales in the lateral line and between 21 and 30 fin rays in each of the pectoral fins. The head is large at around 40% of the standard length. The species within Bembras are all around the same size with the largest being B. japonica which has a maximum published standard length of 30 cm (12 in).

== Distribution and habitat ==
Bembras deepwater flatheads are found in the Indo-Pacific region from the Gulf of Aden to the Western Pacific Ocean north as far as Japan and south to Australia. These are demersal fishes of the continental shelf at depths between 80 and 581 m (262 and 1,906 ft).
