= Robert Earl Richardson =

- Born: 28 November 1877; Brighton, Illinois, U.S.
- Died: 14 April 1935
- Education: DePauw University (preparatory), University of Illinois (B.A., M.A.)
- Known for: The Fishes of Illinois, studies on fishes of Formosa, Philippines, Japan
- Scientific career
- Fields: Aquatic biology, Ichthyology
- Workplaces: University of Illinois, Natural History Survey (Illinois River)
- Author abbrev. (zoology): Richardson

Robert Earl Richardson (28 November 1877 – 14 April 1935) was an American aquatic biologist and ichthyologist.

Richardson was born in Brighton, Illinois, on 28 November 1877. His father was Robert and his mother was Emily Dickerson Richardson. He underwent a preparatory education at DePauw University, before graduating from the University of Illinois in 1901. The university elected him as a fellow and he received a M.A. in 1903. He was a collaborator of David Starr Jordan and, as his co-author, wrote a series of scientific papers on the fishes of Formosa, the Philippines and Japan. In 1909, he took charge of the floating laboratory ran by the Natural History Survey on the Illinois River. His main contribution to ichthyology was The Fishes of Illinois, co-authored with Stephen Alfred Forbes.
