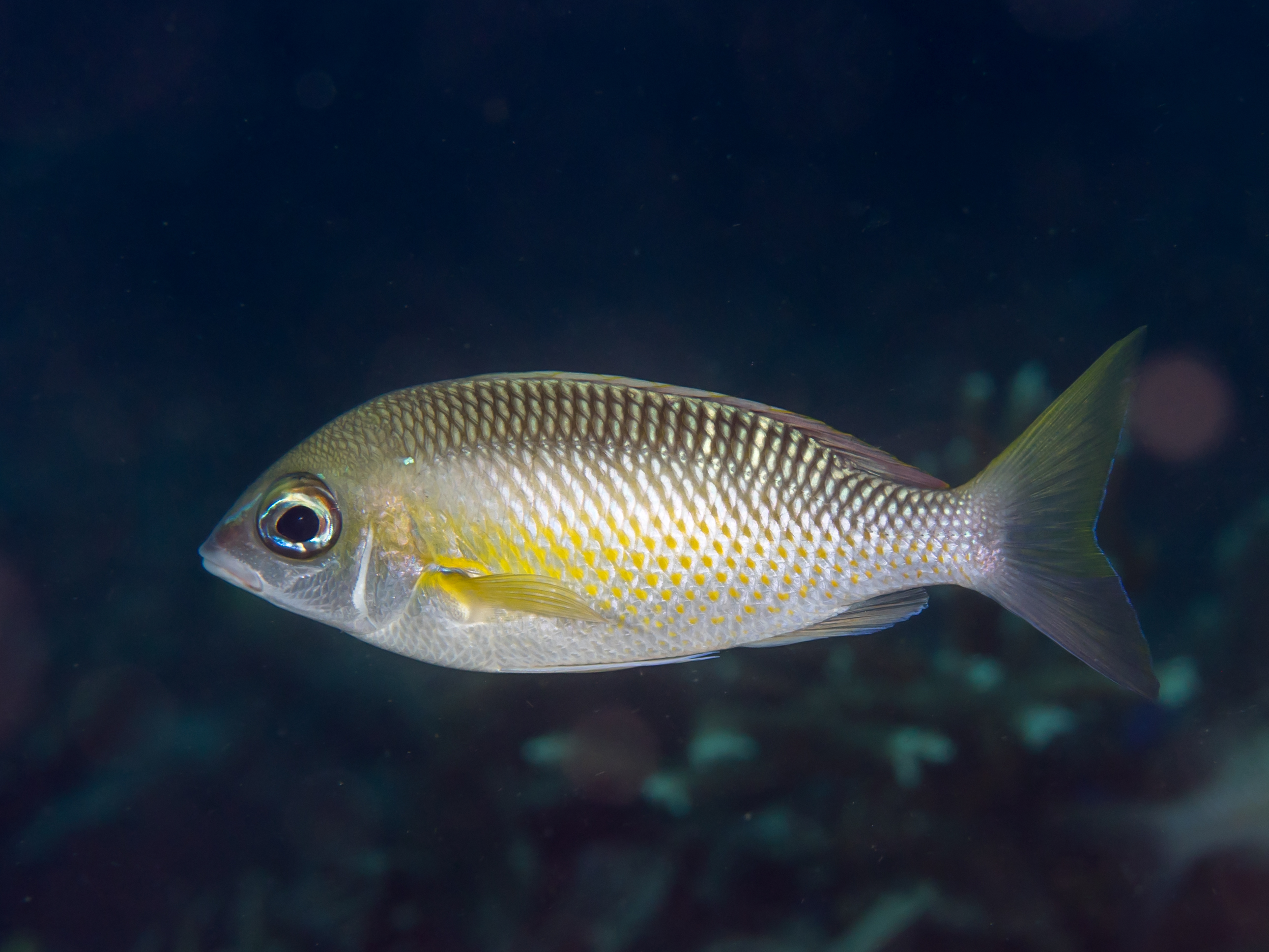
- In Indonesia

Conservation status
- Least Concern (IUCN 3.1)

Scientific classification
- Kingdom: Animalia
- Phylum: Chordata
- Class: Actinopterygii
- Division: Teleostei
- Order: Acanthuriformes
- Family: Nemipteridae
- Genus: Scolopsis
- Species: S. margaritifera

Binomial name
- Scolopsis margaritifera (Cuvier, 1830)

Synonyms
- List: Scolopsides margaritifer Cuvier, 1830; Scolopsis margaritifer (Cuvier, 1830); Scolopsides pectinatus Cuvier, 1830; Scolopsides leucotaenia Bleeker, 1852; Scolopsis leucotaenia (Bleeker, 1852); Scolopsides leucotaenioides Bleeker, 1855; Scolopsis macrophthalmus Ramsay & Ogilby, 1886

= Scolopsis margaritifera =

Species of fish

Scolopsis margaritifera, the pearly monocle bream or pearly spinecheek, is a species of marine ray-finned fish belonging to the family Nemipteridae, the threadfin breams. This fish is found in the marginally in the eastern Indian Ocean and in the western Pacific Ocean.

== Taxonomy ==
Scolopsis margaritifera was first formally described as Scolopsides margaritifer in 1830 by the French zoologist Georges Cuvier with its type locality given as Waigeo in Indonesia.

The 5th edition of Fishes of the World classifies the genus Scolopsis within the family Nemipteridae which it places in the order Spariformes.

== Etymology ==
The specific name margaritifera combines margarita, meaning "pearl", and fero, which means "to bear". This alludes to the scales of the back and flanks having silver spots at their bases.

== Distribution and habitat ==
Scolopsis margaritifera is found in the Andaman Sea in the eastern Indian Ocean eastwards to Vanuatu, south to northeastern Australia and north to Taiwan. It has also been recorded from Palau, Eauripik, Ulithi and the Ryukyu Islands.

This benthic fish is found at depths between 2 and 25 m (6 ft 7 in and 82 ft 0 in) in sandy areas of seabed close to reefs.

== Description ==
This species has a maximum published total length of 28 cm (11 in) although 15 cm (5.9 in) standard length is more typical.

The dorsal fin is supported by 10 spines and 7 soft rays while the anal fin contains 3 spines and 7 soft rays. Its body has a depth that fits into its standard length between 2.4 and 3.8 times with the length of the snout being shorter than the diameter of the eye. The scales on the head reach forward as far as or nearly to the rear nostrils and there are scales on the lower limb of the preoperculum. There is no forward pointing spine underneath the eye. The pelvic fins are long, extending to or just beyond the level of the origin of the anal fin. The caudal fin is forked.

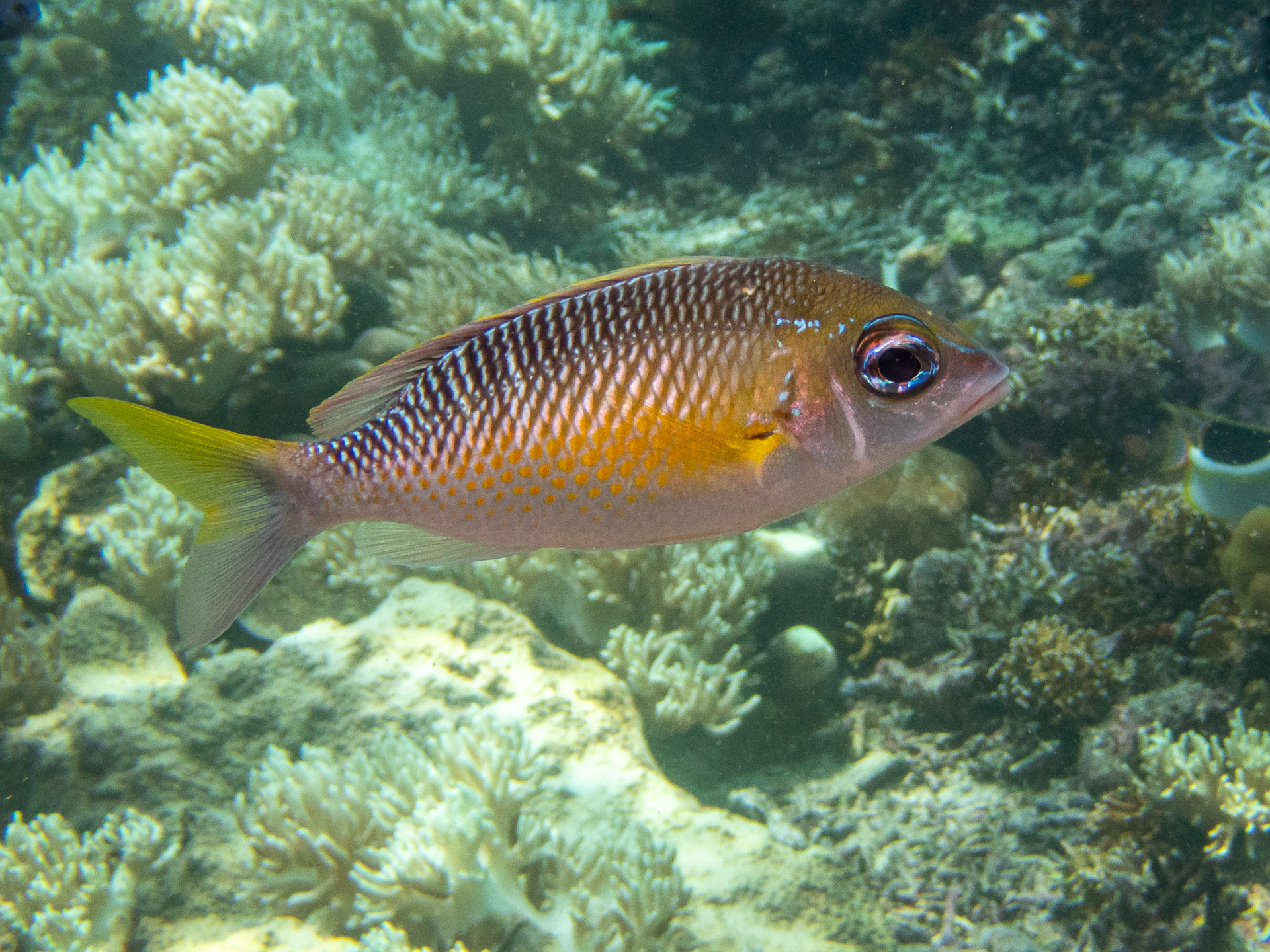
In Indonesia

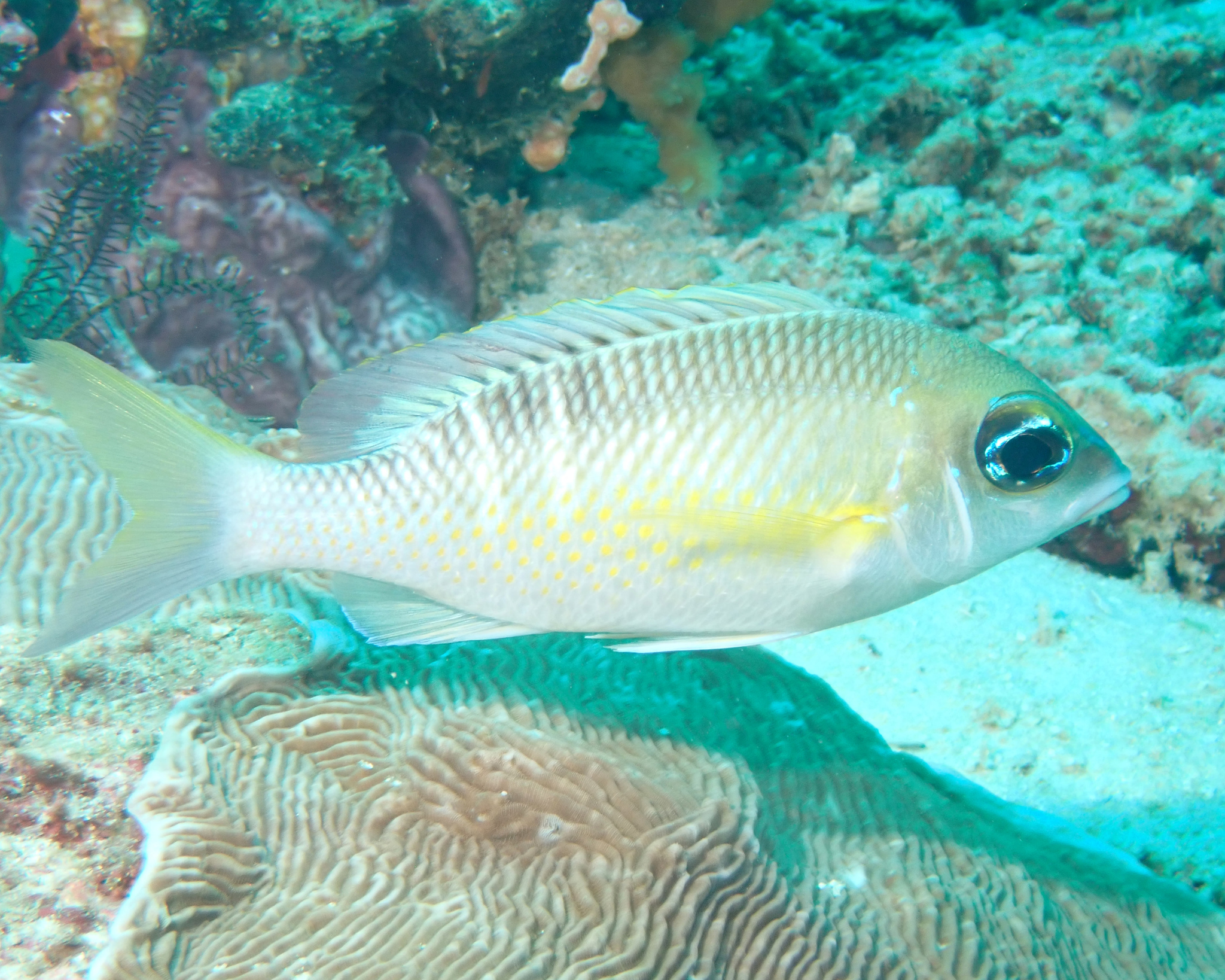
In Indonesia

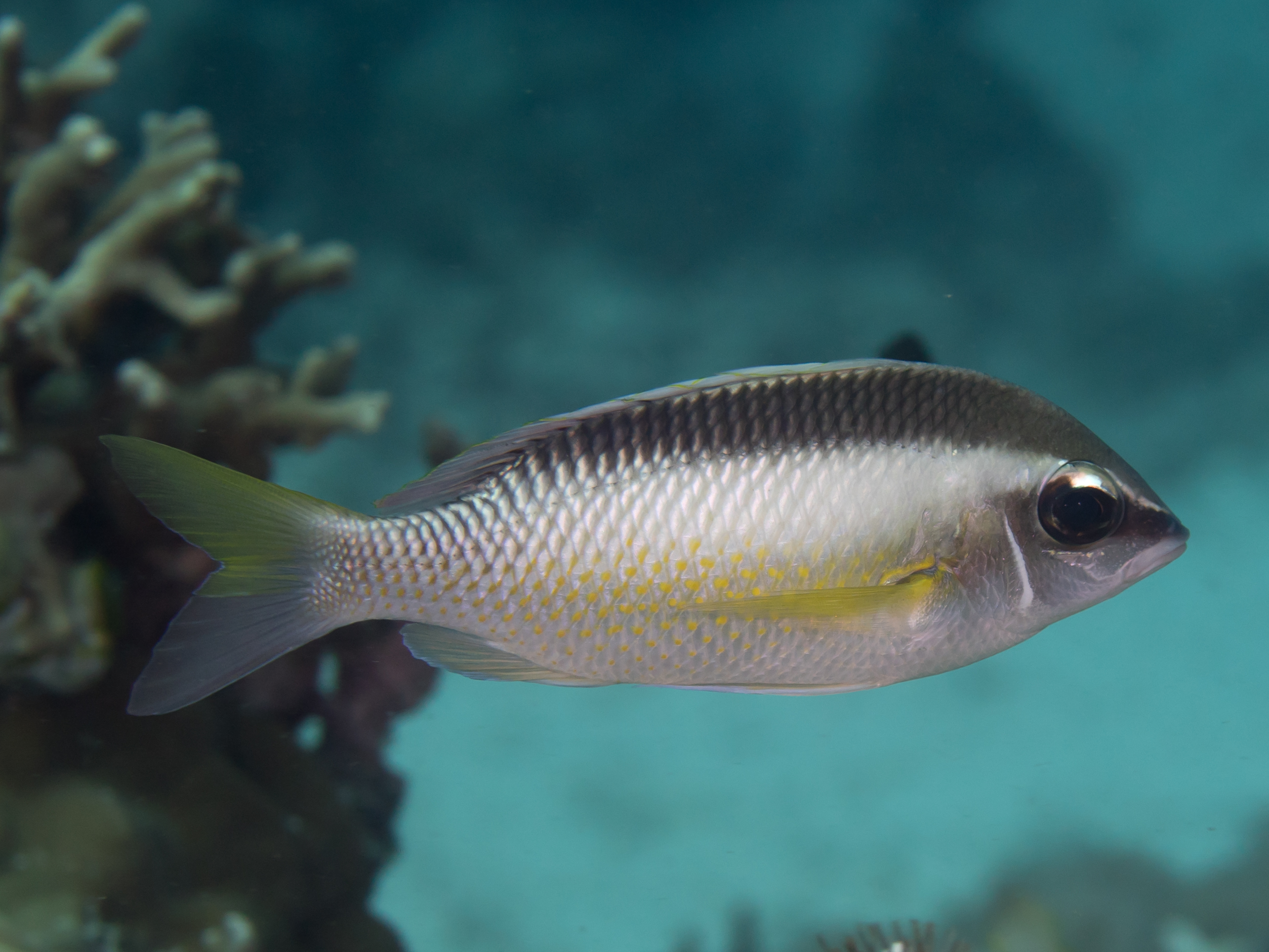
In Indonesia

Adult fish are olive on the back and paler on the lower body. The scales on the body have silvery marks while those on the flanks have yellow spots which create horizontal lines. The snout has a bluish line to the front of the eyes. The juveniles are pale in colour with a darker back and a black longitudinal stripe along the flanks, the lower body is sometimes yellow.

== Biology ==
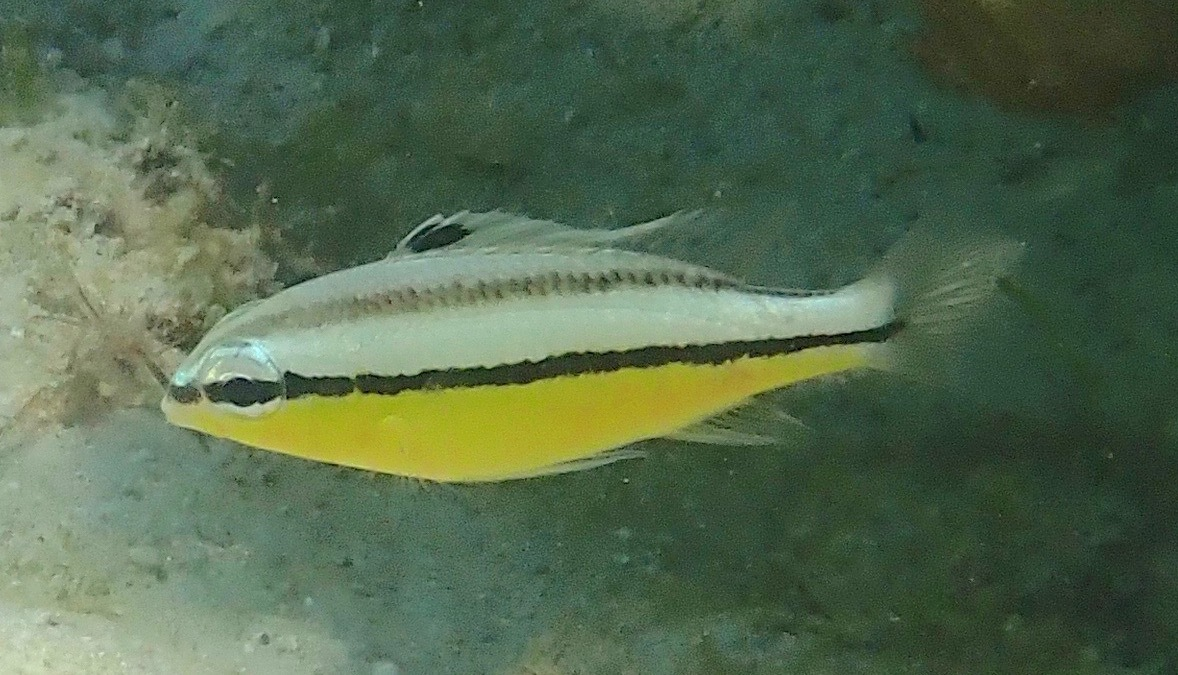
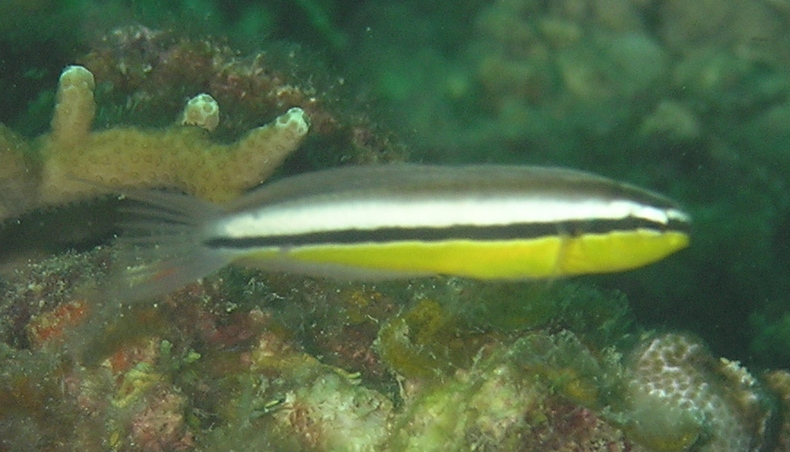
S. margaritifera juveniles (top) mimic the fangblenny Meiacanthus geminatus (bottom)

Scolopsis margaritifera is typically solitary. They feed on crustaceans, polychaetes, molluscs and smaller fishes. The colour and pattern of the juveniles seem to be Batesian mimics of the poison-fang blennies in the genus Meiacanthus, M. geminatus and M. vittatus, even mimicking the blennies' distinctive swimming action. The monogenean Anoplodiscus hutsonae is known to be an ectoparasite of this species, living on the pectoral fins and the surface of the body.
