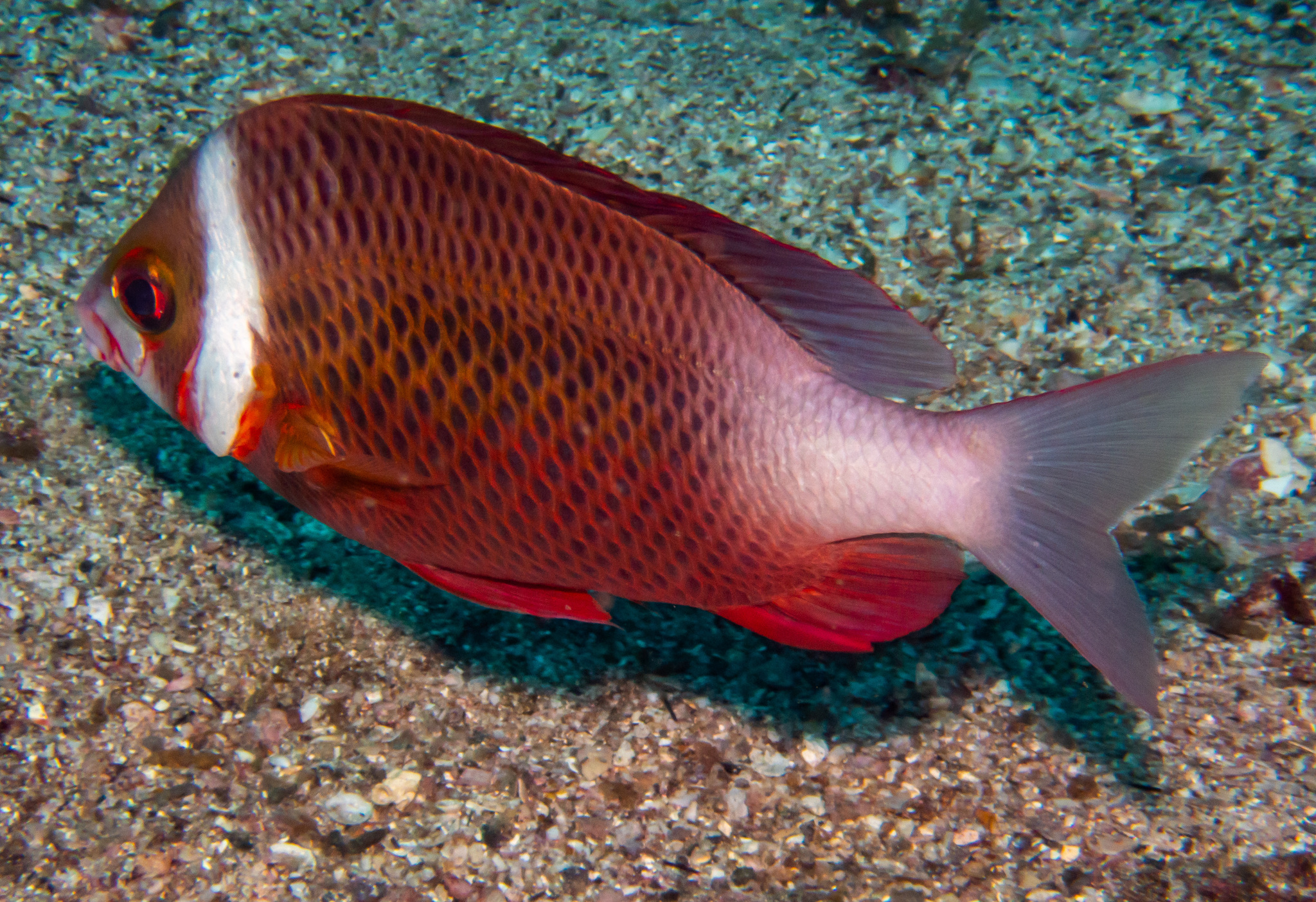

Conservation status
- Least Concern (IUCN 3.1)

Scientific classification
- Kingdom: Animalia
- Phylum: Chordata
- Class: Actinopterygii
- Order: Acanthuriformes
- Family: Nemipteridae
- Genus: Scolopsis
- Species: S. vosmeri

Binomial name
- Scolopsis vosmeri (Bloch, 1792)

Synonyms
- Anthias vosmeri Bloch, 1792; Pomacentrus enneadactylus Lacépède, 1802; Scolopsis igcarensis Mishra, Biswas, Russell, Satpathy & Selvanayagam, 2013

= Scolopsis vosmeri =

Species of fish

Scolopsis vosmeri, also known as Vosmaer's monocle bream, white-banded monocle bream, whitecheek monoclebream and whiteband spinecheek, is a species of marine ray-finned fish belonging to the family Nemipteridae, the threadfin breams. This species occurs in the eastern Indian Ocean and western Pacific Ocean.

== Taxonomy ==
Scolopsis vosmeri was first formally described as Anthias vosmeri by the German physician and naturalist Marcus Elieser Bloch with its type locality given as Japanisches Meer, taken to mean Nagasaki in Japan but this is regarded as erroneous and the correct type locality is probably Tranquebar in India. S. vosmeri was split into 3 species in 2022, revalidating the parapatric S. curite and S. japonica as valid species, separate from S. vosmeri. The 5th edition of Fishes of the World classifies the genus Scolopsis within the family Nemipteridae which it places in the order Spariformes.

== Etymology ==
Scolopsis vosmeri has an honorific specific name but Bloch did not explain who was being honoured but it is thought most likely to be Arnout Vosmaer, the Dutch naturalist who was curator of the natural history collection started by Anne, Princess Royal and Princess of Orange.

== Description ==
Scolopsis vosmeri has its dorsal fin supported by 10 spines and 7 soft rays while the anal fin contains 3 spines and 7 soft rays. It has a body which has a standard length that is twice, or slightly more than twice, its depth with a snot that is a little shorter than the diameter of the eye. The scales on the head extend beyond the eyes but not as far as the rear pair of nostrils. The lower limb of the preoperculum is scaled and there is a forward pointing spine underneath the eye. It has moderately long pelvic fins which reach as far as, or almost as far as, the level of the anus. The background colour is reddish brown with a whitish caudal peduncle, the scales on the flanks have dark spots. There is a wide white, vertical bar running from the crown onto the operculum. The dorsal, pectoral and pelvic fins are dark reddish and there is no black spot on the upper base of the base of the pectoral fin. There is normally a white longitudinal band running below the lateral line starting on the upper operculum to underneath the soft-rayed part of the dorsal fin. In some fish this is absent and observations have seen that the fish can actively make this band flash as they swim, probably as an intraspecific signal. This species has a maximum published total length of 25 cm (9.8 in) although 15 cm (5.9 in) standard length is more typical.

== Distribution and habitat ==
Scolopsis vosmeri is found in the Indian Ocean from the Arabian Sea and Sri Lanka east into the Western Pacific Ocean as far as East Malaysia and Brunei. This is a benthic fish found in inshore waters in weedy areas, normally on sand or mud turbid waters or weedy areas, usually on sand or mud substrates in the vicinity of reefs, typically in turbid waters, down to about 25 m (82 ft).

== Biology ==
Scolopsis vosmeri is typically encountered as solitary individual but this species will school in deeper waters. It feeds on benthic animals.

== Fisheries ==
Scolopsis vosmeri is caught in trawl fisheries, hand lines and fish traps, as well as bycatch. The catch is sold fresh, preserved by smoking or salting, or as fish balls.
