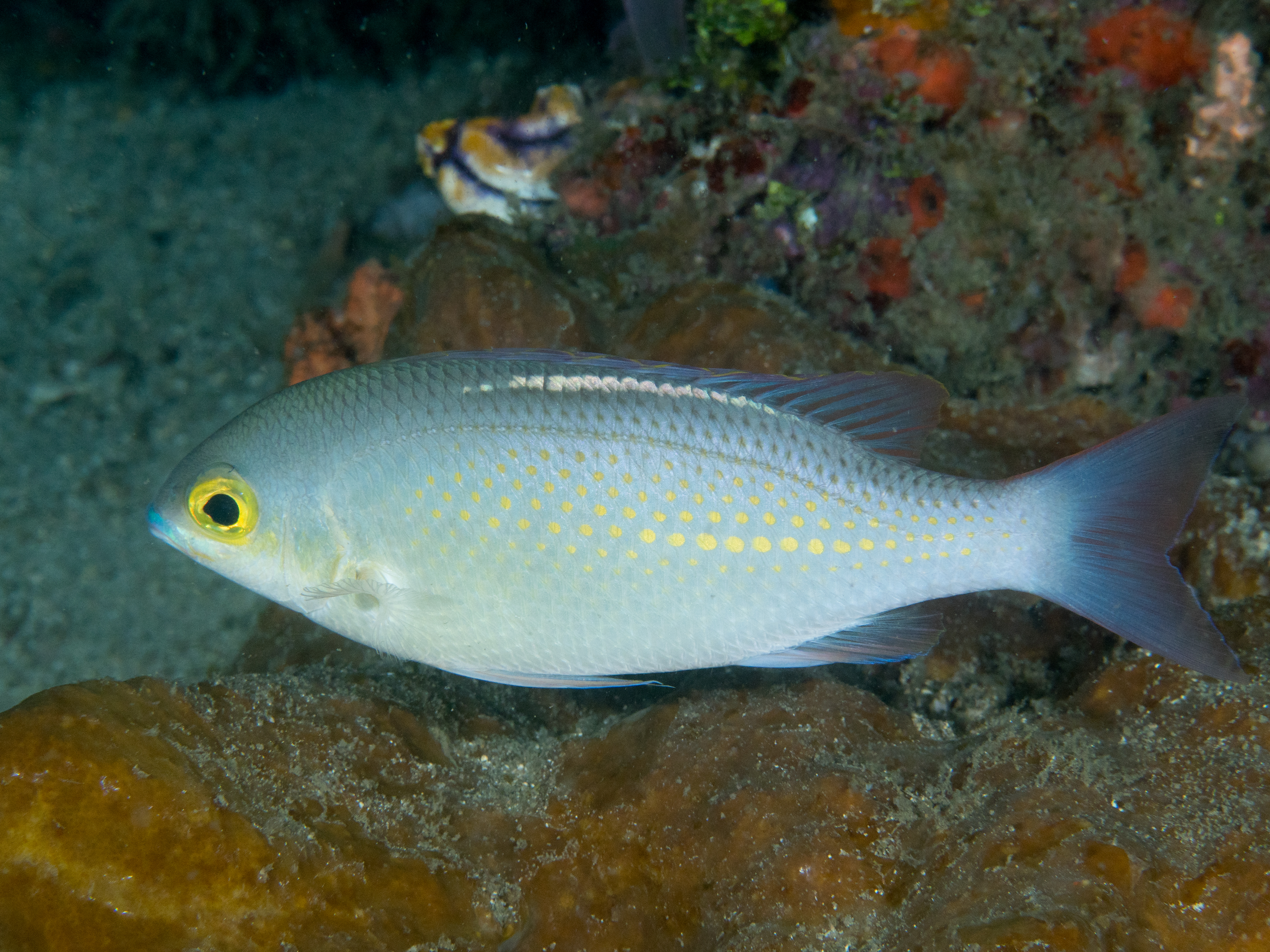

Conservation status
- Least Concern (IUCN 3.1)

Scientific classification
- Kingdom: Animalia
- Phylum: Chordata
- Class: Actinopterygii
- Order: Acanthuriformes
- Family: Nemipteridae
- Genus: Scolopsis
- Species: S. ciliata

Binomial name
- Scolopsis ciliata (Lacépède, 1802)

Synonyms
- List: Holocentrus ciliatus Lacépède, 1802; Scolopsis ciliatus (Lacépède, 1802); Scolopsides lycogenis Cuvier, 1829; Lycogenis argyrosoma Kuhl & Van Hasselt, 1830; Scolopsis specularis De Vis, 1882; Scolopsis luzonia D. S. Jordan & Seale, 1907

= Scolopsis ciliata =

Species of fish

Scolopsis ciliata, the saw-jawed monocle bream, ciliate spinecheek, silver-line spinecheek or whitestreak monocle bream is a species of marine ray-finned fish belonging to the family Nemipteridae, the threadfin breams. This fish is found in the Indian and Pacific Oceans.

== Taxonomy ==
Scolopsis ciliata was first formally described as Holocentrus ciliatus in 1802 by the French naturalist and politician Bernard Germain de Lacépède with no type locality given, other than Mer des Indes. The 5th edition of Fishes of the World classifies the genus Scolopsis within the family Nemipteridae which it places in the order Spariformes.

== Etymology ==
Scolopsis ciliata has the specific name ciliata which was given as this fish was said to have scales with cilia.

== Description ==
Scolopsis ciliata has its dorsal fin supported by 10 spines and 7 soft rays while the anal fin contains 3 spines and 7 soft rays. Its body has a depth that fits into its standard length between 3 and 3.4 times with the length of the snout being slightly shorter than the diameter of the eye. The scales on the head reach forward as far as or just beyond the front nostrils and there are scales on the lower limb of the preoperculum. There is a forward pointing spine underneath the eye. The pelvic fins are long, extending to or just beyond the level of the anus. The caudal fin is forked. The background colour is olive on the back and white on the lower body with a white stripe underneath the dorsal fin. There is a band of yellow spots along the flanks starting at the pectoral fin and ending on the caudal peduncle. The upper and lower margins of the caudal fin are occasionally reddish. This species has a maximum published total length of 25 cm (9.8 in) although 10 cm (3.9 in) standard length is more typical.

== Distribution and habitat ==
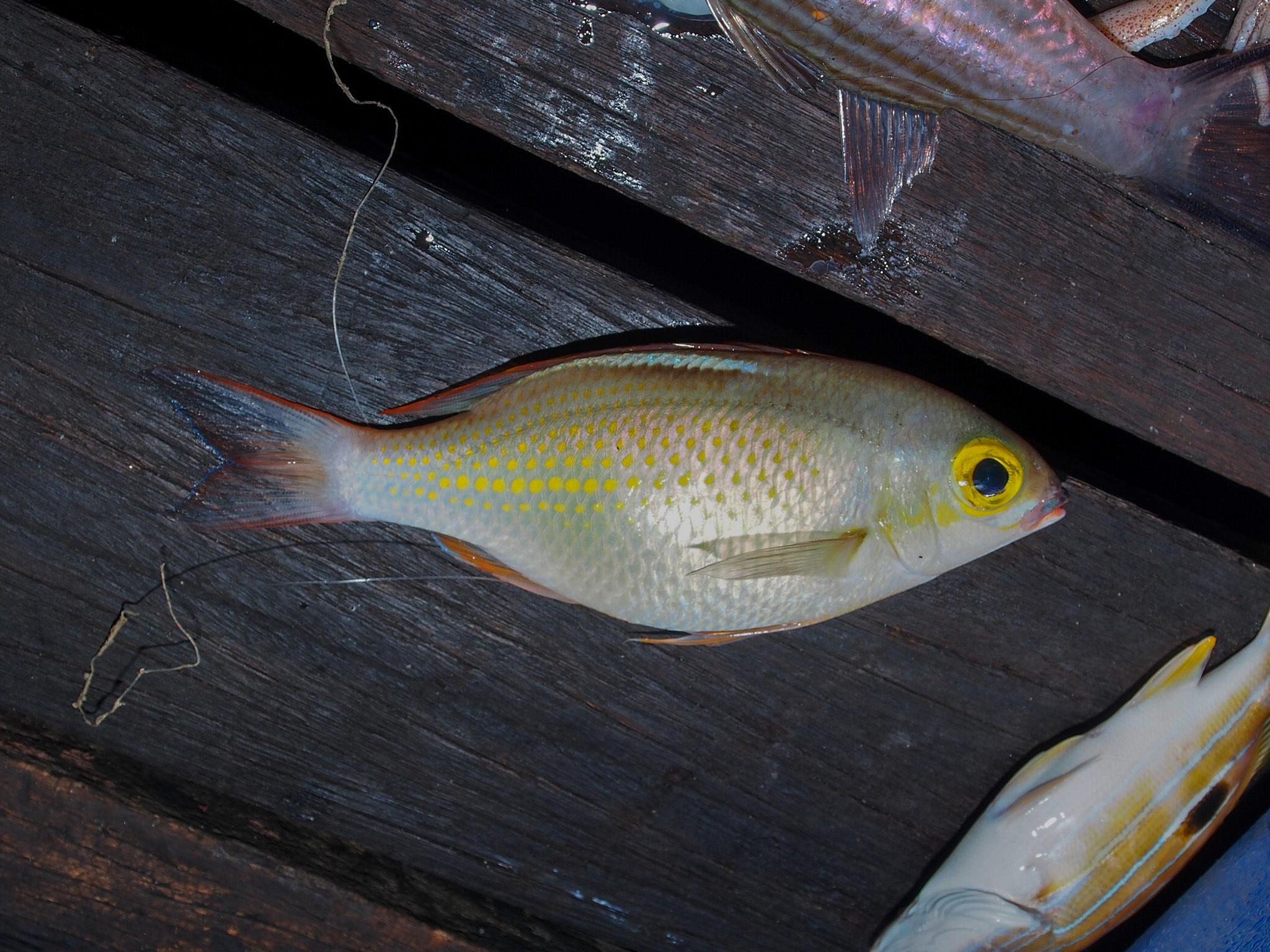
In Malaysia

Scolopsis ciliata is found in the eastern Indian Ocean in the Andaman Sea east into the Western Pacific Ocean as far east as New Caledonia and Vanuatu, north to the Ryukyu Islands. There is an unpublished record from Wallis Island too. This species is found at depths between 2 and 25 m (6 ft 7 in and 82 ft 0 in) on sandy substrates close to coral reefs, near mangroves and in silty areas where there is low visibility. Often found in groups and feeds on smaller fishes and benthic invertebrates.

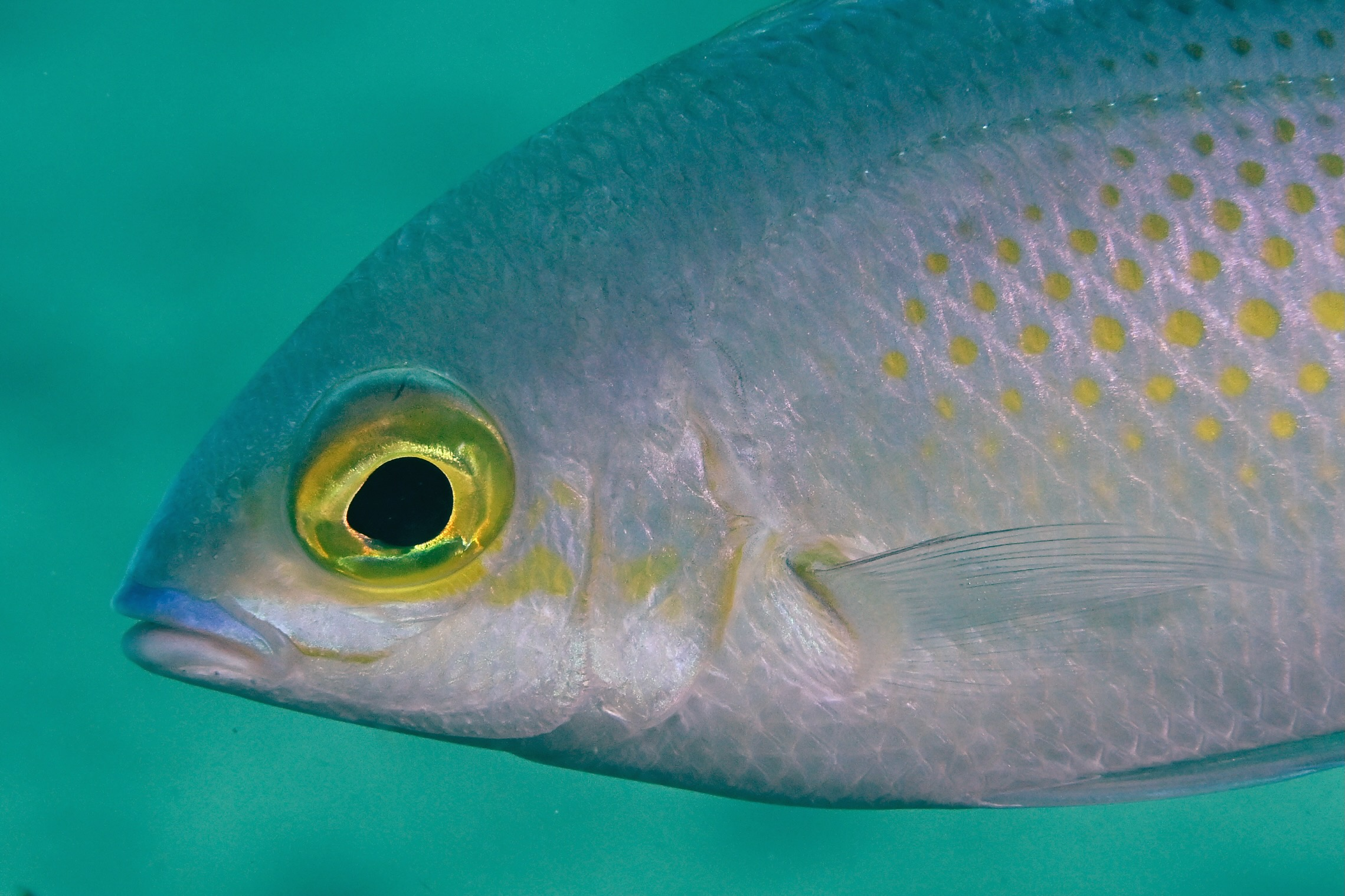
Face closeup of the "yellow monocle eye". Sabang, Puerto Galera, Mindoro, Philippines. 10-Apr-2025
