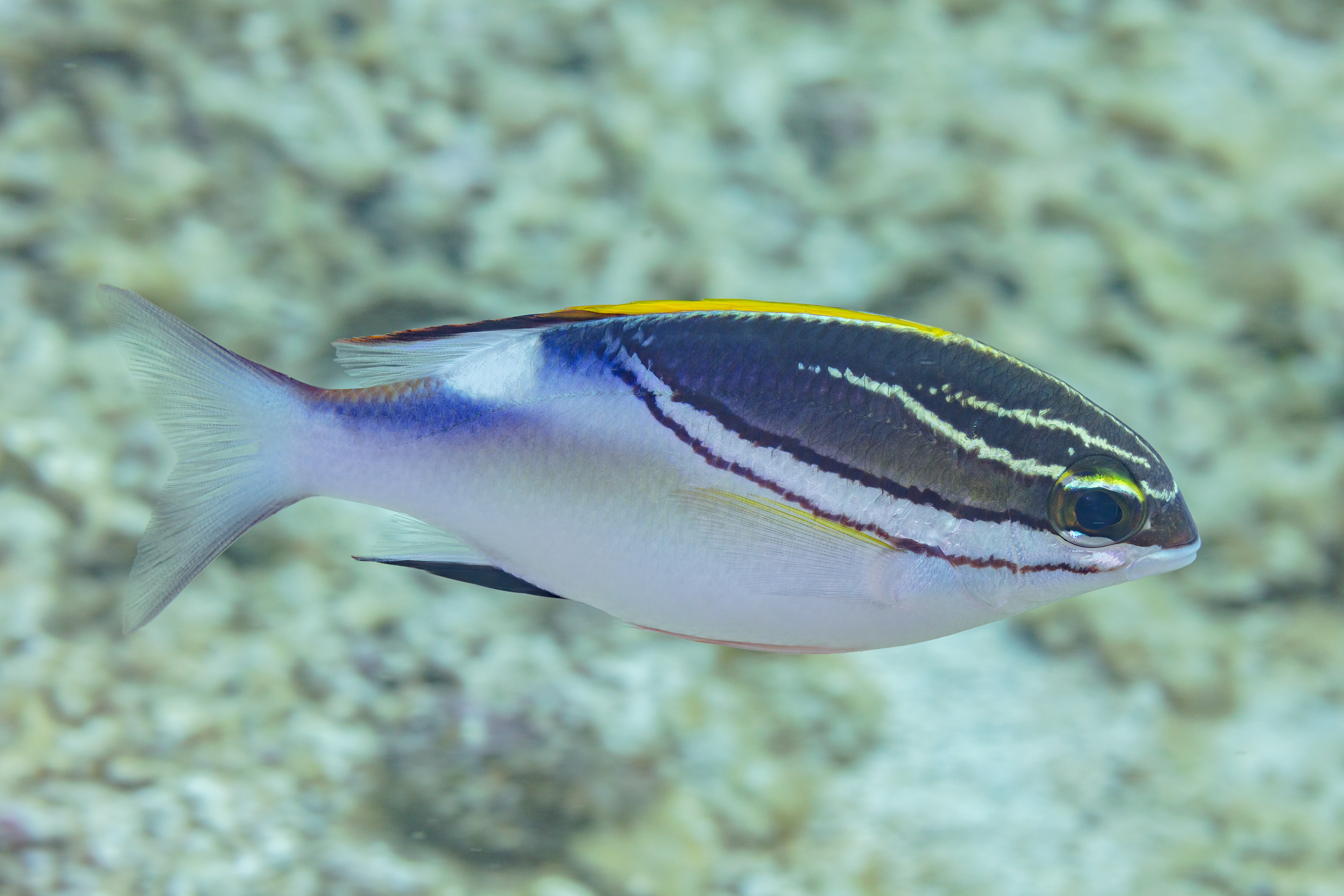
- Two-lined monocle bream (S. bilineata)

Scientific classification
- Kingdom: Animalia
- Phylum: Chordata
- Class: Actinopterygii
- Division: Teleostei
- Order: Acanthuriformes
- Family: Nemipteridae
- Genus: Scolopsis; G. Cuvier, 1814

Type species
- Scolopsis sayanus Gilliams, 1824

Synonyms
- Ghanan Forsskål, 1775 (not available); Scolopsides G. Cuvier, 1829; Lycogenis G. Cuvier, 1830; Ctenoscolopsis Fowler, 1931

= Scolopsis =

Genus of fishes

Scolopsis is a genus of marine ray-finned fishes commonly referred to as monocle breams. They belong to the family Nemipteridae, the threadfin breams. These fishes are found in the Indian Ocean and the western Pacific Ocean.

== Taxonomy ==
Scolopsis was first proposed as a genus in 1814 by the French zoologist Georges Cuvier. It is not clear what species Cuvier was classifying within the genus, although he referred to le curite which he referred to a fish described as having the Telugu name kurite from a figure by Patrick Russell. However, the type species has traditionally been stated as Scolopsis sayanus, described by Jacob Gilliams in 1824 from Pennsylvania. Scolopsis sayanus is a synonym of Aphredoderus sayanus, the freshwater American pirate perch. Some authorities argue that as the type species of this genus is not classified within it then the ICZN should be petitioned to designate a new type species, perhaps S. lineatus, while others state that it should be S. curite, a species revalidated in 2022.

The 5th edition of Fishes of the World classifies Scolopsis within the family Nemipteridae which it places in the order Spariformes.

== Etymology ==
Scolopsis combines scolo, meaning "thorn", with opsis, meaning "face", thought to be referring to the large backwards pointing spine on the suborbital or the serrated rear margin of the preoperculum having rows of blunt spines along its length.

== Species ==
The currently recognized species in this genus are:

Species	Common name	Image
Scolopsis affinis W. K. H. Peters, 1877	Peters' monocle bream	
Scolopsis aurata (M. Park, 1797)	Yellowstripe monocle bream	
Scolopsis bilineata (Bloch, 1793)	Two-lined monocle bream	
Scolopsis bimaculata Rüppell, 1828	Thumbprint monocle bream	
Scolopsis ciliata (Lacépède, 1802)	Saw-jawed monocle bream	
Scolopsis curite Cuvier 1815	Whitecheek monocle bream	
Scolopsis frenata (Cuvier, 1830)	Bridled monocle bream	
Scolopsis ghanam (Forsskål, 1775)	Arabian monocle bream	
Scolopsis japonica (Bloch 1793)	Javanese monocle bream	
Scolopsis lacrima Nakamura, Béarez & Motomura, 2019	Teary monocle bream	
Scolopsis lineata Quoy & Gaimard, 1824	Striped monocle bream	
Scolopsis margaritifera (Cuvier, 1830)	Pearly monocle bream	
Scolopsis meridiana Nakamura, Russell, Moore & Motomura, 2018	Sahul monocle bream	
Scolopsis monogramma (Cuvier, 1830)	Monogrammed monocle bream	
Scolopsis regina Whitley 1937	Crescent monocle bream	
Scolopsis taeniata (Cuvier, 1830)	Black-streaked monocle bream	
Scolopsis taenioptera (Cuvier, 1830)	Lattice monocle bream	
Scolopsis temporalis (Cuvier, 1830)	Bald-spot monocle bream	
Scolopsis trilineata Kner, 1868	Three-lined monocle bream	
Scolopsis vosmeri (Bloch, 1792)	Vosmaer’s monocle bream	
Scolopsis xenochrous Günther, 187	Oblique-barred monocle bream	

== Characteristics ==
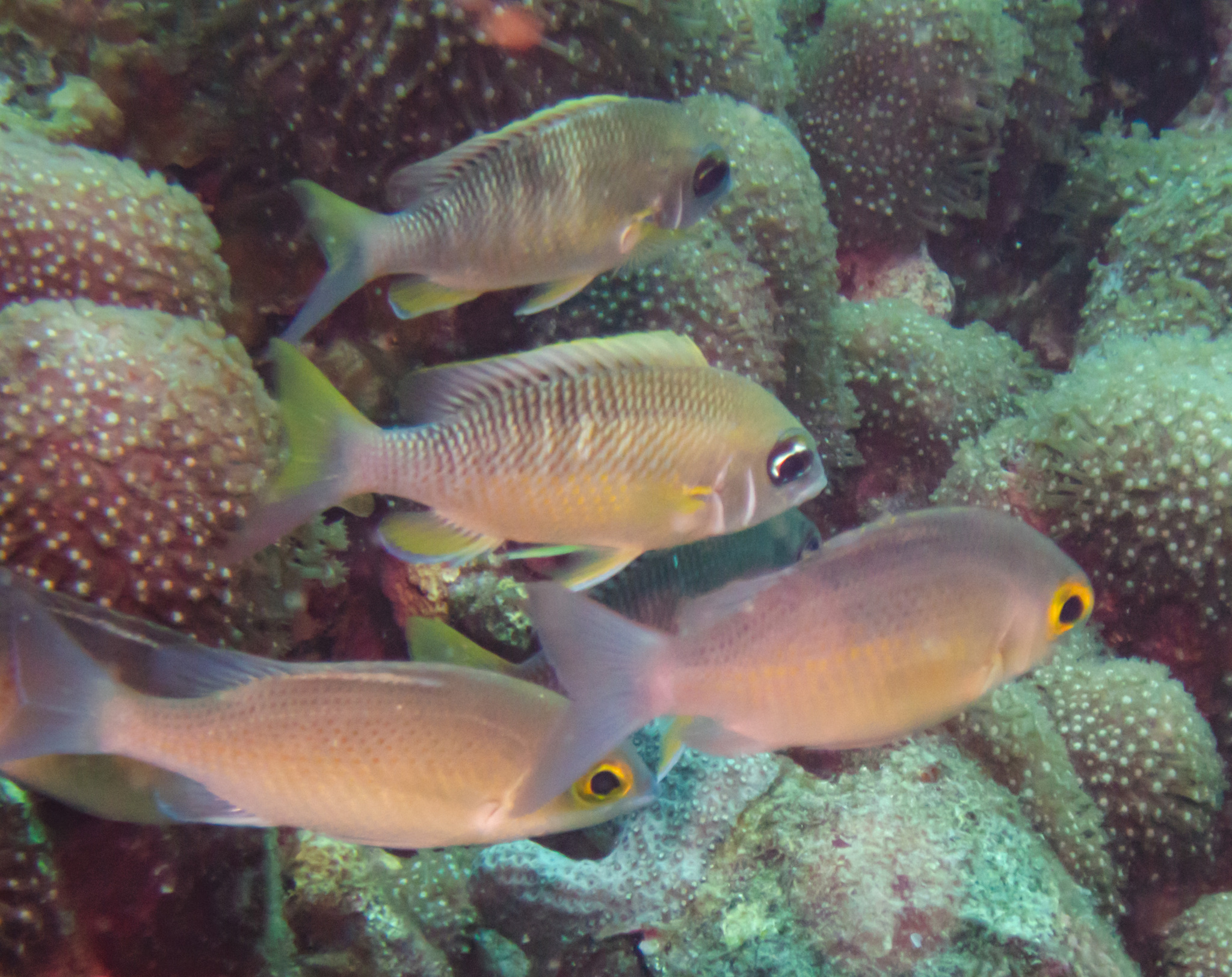
S. margaritifera and S. ciliata, in Thailand

Scolopsis monocle breams are small to medium sized fishes with slender to moderately deep bodies that are laterally compressed. They have brush like or small conical shaped teeth arranged in tapering bands in both the upper and lower jaws but there are no canine-like teeth. The pectoral fins are short to moderately long and are supported by 2 simple and between 12 and 17 branched fin rays. In the anal fin the second spine is longer and thicker than the others. The caudal fin may be emarginate or forked and either or both lobes may be pointed, falcate and extended by short filaments. The bodies of these fish are covered in ctenoid scales and the scales on the crown extend forwards to the level of the centre of the eyes or to the rear nostrils or beyond the rear nostrils. The suborbital is naked and has a large retrose spine and a series of smaller spines or serrations on its rear edge. Some species have a small forward pointing spine underneath the eye. The lower limb of the preoperculum may be naked or scaly and its rear margin may be serrated or spiny. The Operculum (fish) is scaly and its upper margin has a small, flat spine enclosed within the skin. The smallest species is S. xenochrous with a maximum published total length of 22 cm (8.7 in) while the largest is S. monogramma with a maximum published total length of 38 cm (15 in).

== Distribution and habitat ==
Scolopsis monocle breams have a wide distribution in the Indian and Western Pacific Oceans. They are benthic fishes, typically found at deoths arf 60 m (200 ft) or less on reefs or on sandy or muddy substrates.

== Biology ==
Scolopsis monocle breams may be found as individuals or in schools and their prey is mainly small crustaceans taken off the seabed. The juveniles of some species are Batesian mimics of other fish species. Some of the species in this genus are known to be protogynous hermaphrodites.
