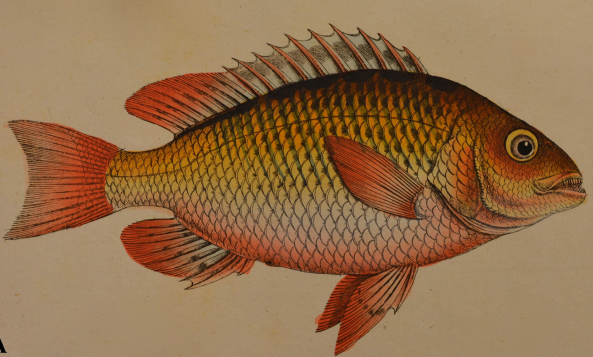

Scientific classification
- Kingdom: Animalia
- Phylum: Chordata
- Class: Actinopterygii
- Order: Acanthuriformes
- Family: Nemipteridae
- Genus: Scolopsis
- Species: S. japonica

Binomial name
- Scolopsis japonica (Bloch, 1793)

Synonyms
- Anthias japonicus Bloch, 1793; Lutjanus japonicus (Bloch. 1793); Sparus japonicus (Bloch. 1793); Scolopsides kate Cuvier, 1829; Scolopsides torquatus Cuvier, 1830; Scolopsides pomotis Richardson, 1846

= Scolopsis japonica =

Species of fish

Scolopsis japonica, the Javan monocle bream or whitecheek monocle bream, is a species of marine ray-finned fish belonging to the family Nemipteridae, the threadfin breams. This fish is found in the western Pacific Ocean.

== Taxonomy ==
Scolopsis japonica was first formally described in 1793 by the German physician and naturalist Marcus Elieser Bloch with its type locality given as Japan, but this is likely to mean Java. This taxon was regarded as a synonyms of S. vosmeri but S. vosmerii has been shown to be a species complex of three species in 2022. S. curite in the Indian Ocean, S. vosmeri in the northern Indian Ocean and Indonesia and S. japonica in the Western Pacific Ocean. S. japonica and S. curite are closely related sister species which replace each other geographically. The 5th edition of Fishes of the World classifies the genus Scolopsis within the family Nemipteridae which it places in the order Spariformes.

== Description ==
Scolopsis japonica is very similar to S. vosmeri but it has a wedge shape black spot on the upper pectoral fin base, has no white band underneath the lateral line and in having greenish yellow, rather than black spots on the bases of the scales on the body. The colour of the pelvic and anal fins also differing being yellow rather than reddish brown, the caudal peduncle being yellowish rather than white and the caudal fin being yellow rather than greyish. S. japonica is not easy to tell apart from S. curite as they have very similar colours and patterns, however, in S. japonica the margin of the preoperculum is serrated or has a sepny edge while the preoperculum of S. curite is more robust and rough with a bony margin which has one or two rows of short blunt spines along its whole length.

== Distribution and habitat ==
Scolopsis japonica is found in the western Pacific Ocean where it ranges from western Indonesia and north-western Australia, east as far as the Philippines and north as far as southern Japan. It is found on sand or mud substrates in depths down to 30 m (98 ft) and in the vicinity of reefs.
