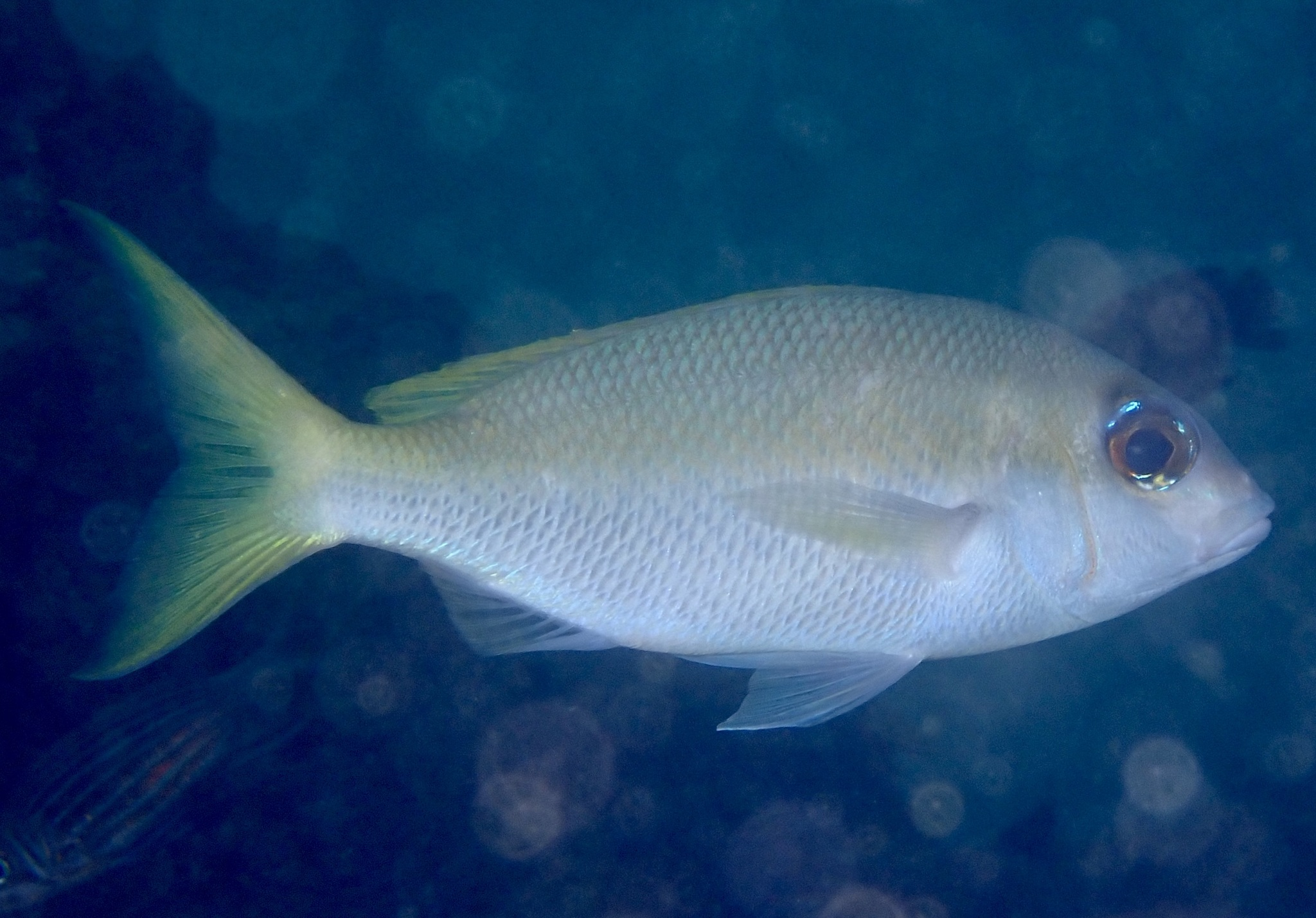

Conservation status
- Least Concern (IUCN 3.1)

Scientific classification
- Kingdom: Animalia
- Phylum: Chordata
- Class: Actinopterygii
- Division: Teleostei
- Order: Acanthuriformes
- Family: Nemipteridae
- Genus: Scolopsis
- Species: S. affinis

Binomial name
- Scolopsis affinis W.K.H. Peters, 1877

= Scolopsis affinis =

Species of fish

Scolopsis affinis, the Peters' monocle bream, bridled monocle bream or yellowtail spinecheek, is a species of marine ray-finned fish belonging to the family Nemipteridae, the threadfin breams. This species is found in the Indian and Western Pacific Oceans.

== Taxonomy ==
Scolopsis affinis was first formally described in 1877 by the German zoologist Wilhelm Peters with its type locality given as Carteret Harbour on Lambom Island, near Cape St. George in southern New Ireland, in the Bismarck Archipelago of Papua New Guinea. The 5th edition of Fishes of the World classifies the genus Scolopsis within the family Nemipteridae which it places in the order Spariformes.

== Etymology ==
Scolopsis affinis has the specific name affinis which means "related", a reference to its similarity to S. bilineata.

== Description ==
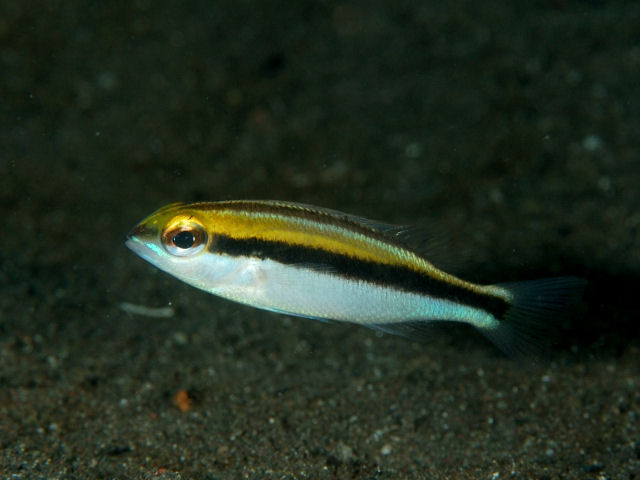
Juvenile

Scolopsis affinis has its dorsal fin supported by 10 spines and 7 soft rays while the anal fin contains 3 spines and 7 soft rays. Its body has a depth that is approximately one third of its standard length with the length of the snout being the same as the diameter of the eye. The scales on the head reach forward as far as the rear nostrils and there are scales on the lower limb of the preoperculum. There is no forward pointing spine on the suborbital. The pelvic fins are long extending as far or past the level of the anus. The caudal fin is forked with the lobes in larger individuals becoming falcate. The base colour of the body is silvery-white, with greyish above the lateral line and a wide, longitudinal yellow stripe down the middle of the body from the eye to the caudal peduncle. The crown and snout are dusky grey, there is a vague bluish intraorbital stripe and a slender white stripe from the centre of the upper lip to the eye. The caudal fin is yellow with thin pale blue edges. The juveniles have two longitudinal dusky brown stripes along the back and a dusky brown midlateral stripe. This species has a maximum published total length of 24 cm (9.4 in) although 15 cm (5.9 in) standard length is more typical.

== Distribution and habitat ==
Scolopsis affinis is found in the Western Pacific Ocean and, marginally, in the eastern Indian Oceand from the southern Andaman Sea east to the Solomon Islands and the reefs of the Timor Sea, north to the Ryukyu Islands of southern Japan and south to northeastern Australia and New Caledonia. It is found at depths between 3 and 60 m (9.8 and 196.9 ft) in sheltered areas, such as lagoons, on sandy and muddy substrates in the vicinity of reefs.

== Behaviour ==
Scolopsis affinis may be solitary or be found in small schools. The adults tend to be in deeper water while juveniles prefer shallower inshore waters. This species performs behaviour of mobbing the bobbit worm (Eunice aphroditois). The fish swims to the entrance of the bobbit worm's burrow, positions itself nearly vertically face-down above it, and blows sharp jets of water in the worm's direction.

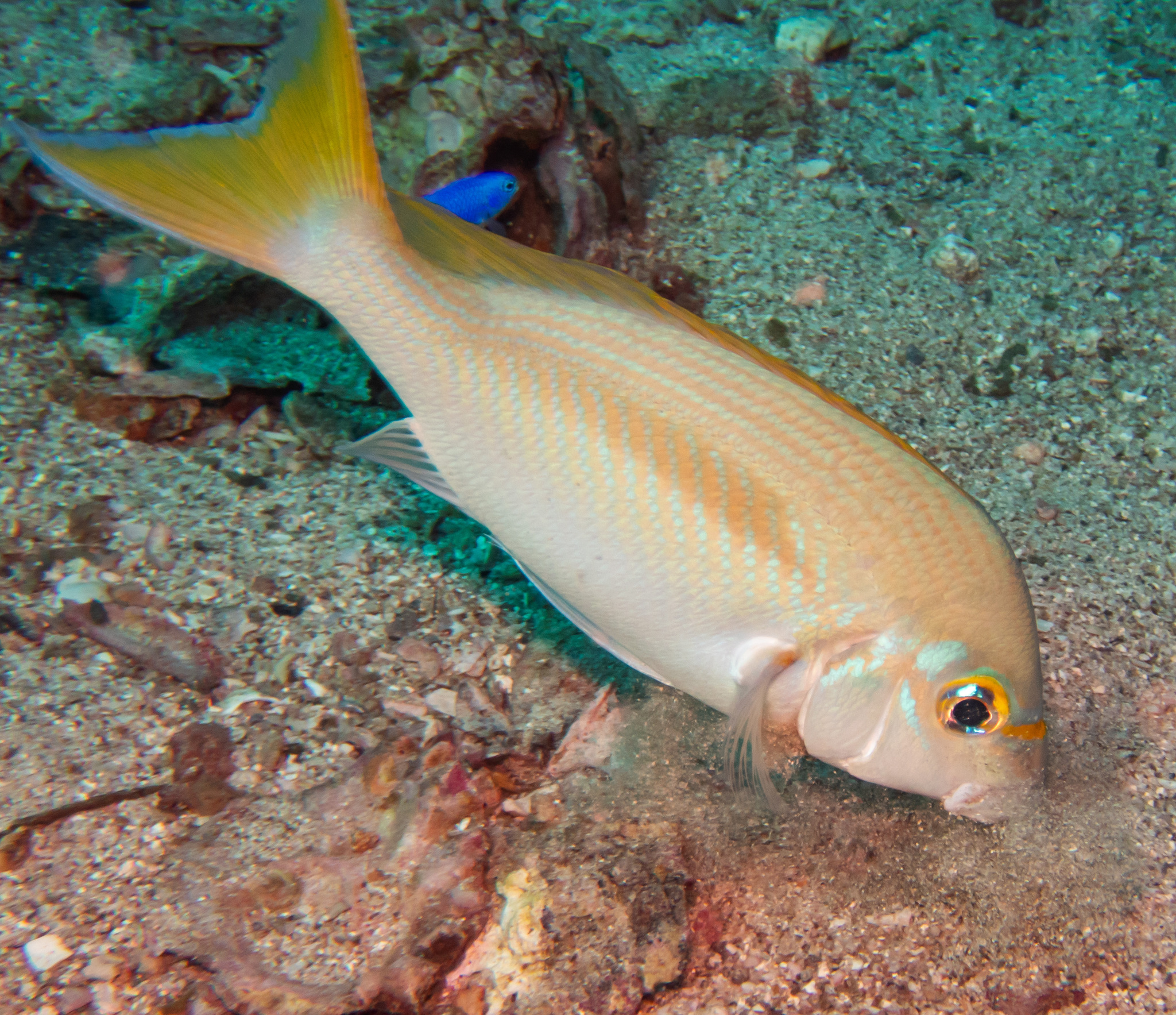
In Thailand

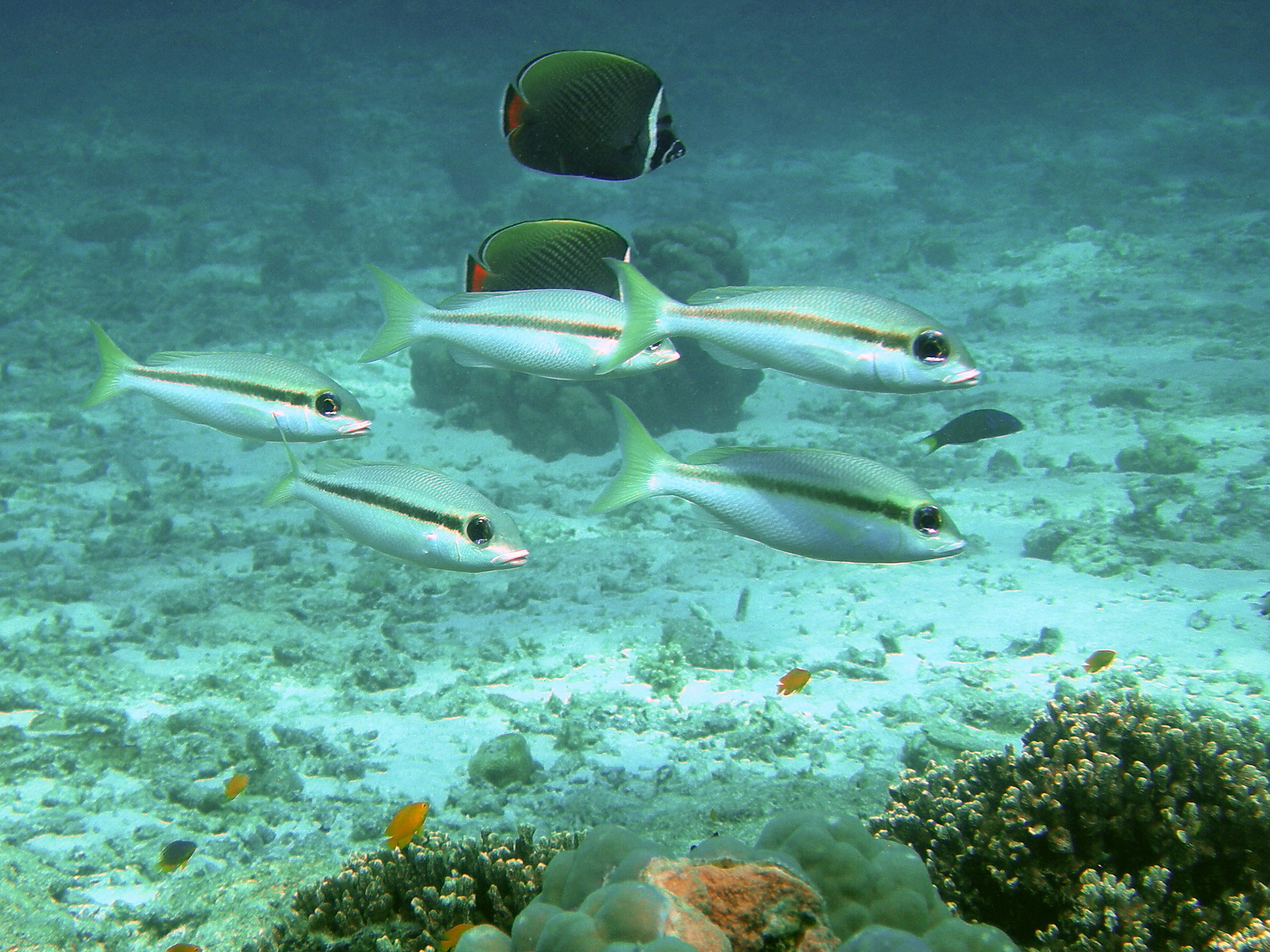
In Thailand

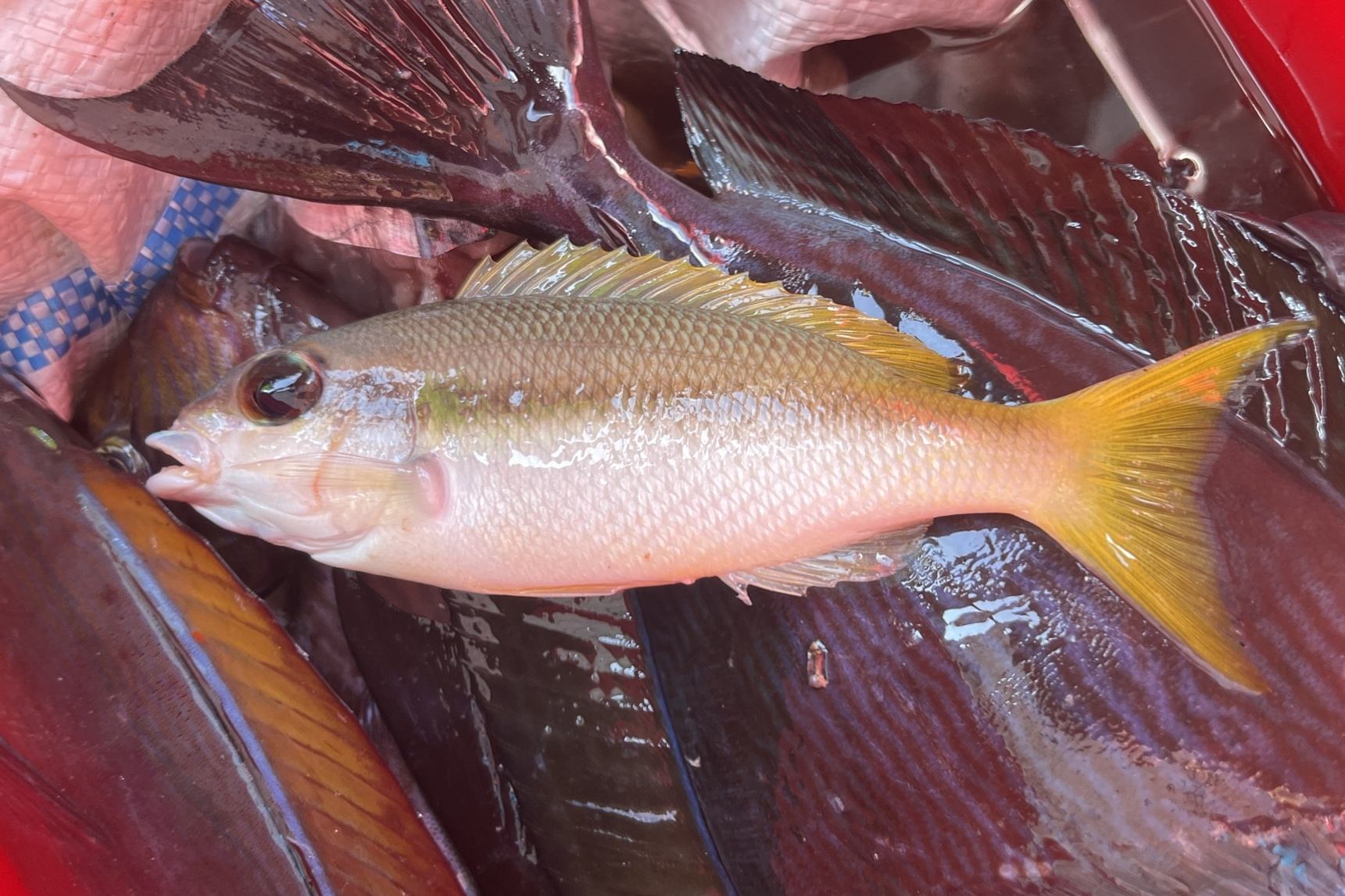
In Indonesia
