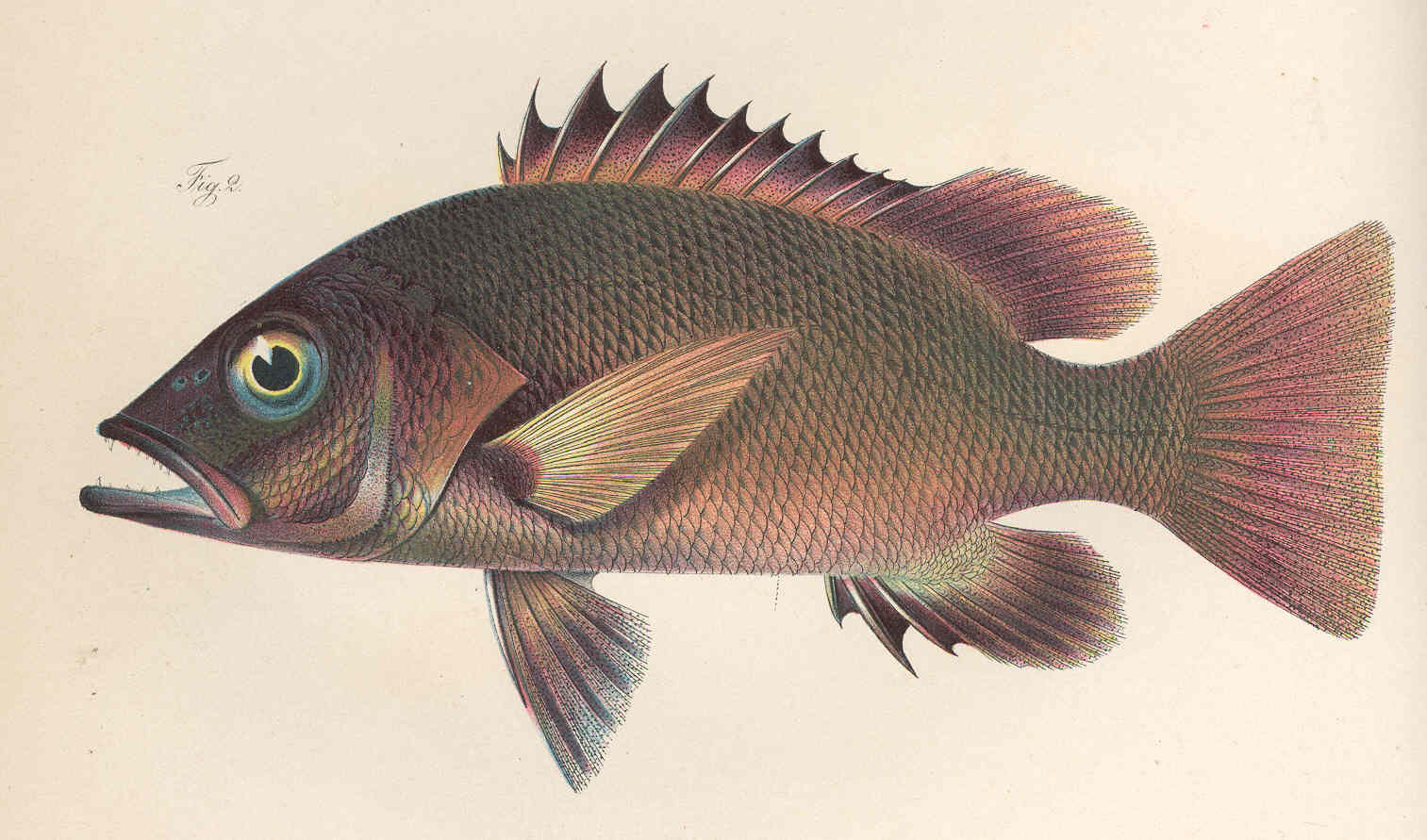

Conservation status
- Data Deficient (IUCN 3.1)

Scientific classification
- Kingdom: Animalia
- Phylum: Chordata
- Class: Actinopterygii
- Order: Acanthuriformes
- Family: Lutjanidae
- Genus: Lutjanus
- Species: L. endecacanthus

Binomial name
- Lutjanus endecacanthus Bleeker, 1863

Synonyms
- Lutjanus modestus Bleeker, 1863

= Lutjanus endecacanthus =

Species of fish

Lutjanus endecacanthus, the Guinea snapper, is a species of marine ray-finned fish, a snapper belonging to the family Lutjanidae. It is found on the west coast of Africa in the eastern Atlantic Ocean.

== Taxonomy ==
Lutjanus endecacanthus was first formally described in 1863 by the Dutch physician, herpetologist and ichthyologist Pieter Bleeker with the type locality given as "Ashantee in Guinea". The specific name endecacanthus is a compound of endeka which means "eleven" and acanthus meaning a "thorn" or "spine", referring to the 11 spines in the dorsal fin. Bleeker also described L. modestus in 1863 and it is not clear whether this is a synonym of this species or L. agennes, Other authorities consider that this taxon may be a synonym of Lutjanus dentatus.

== Description ==
Lutjanus endecacanthus has a moderately deep body with a pointed head which has an acute snout. The knob and incision on the preoperculum are weakly developed. The vomerine teeth are arranged a triangular patch and there is sometimes a rearwards extension. The dorsal fin contains 10-11 spines and 13-14 soft rays while the anal fin has 3 spines and 8 soft rays. The long pectoral fins extend to the level of the anus and contains 17 rays. The caudal fin is truncate. The maximum total length recorded for this species is 85 cm (33 in). The adults are brown, darker on the back and upper flanks and paler on the lower flanks, with a silvery abdomen and brown fins. The juveniles often have 6 to 8 vertical lines of white spots on the flanks and a pair of blue lines on the cheek underneath the eye. In individuals with a standard length of 15 cm (5.9 in) have a dusky patch with white front and rear margins on the dorsal part of the caudal peduncle and to the rear of the dorsal fin.

== Distribution and habitat ==
Lutjanus endecacanthus is found in the tropical eastern Atlantic Ocean. It is found along the coast of western Africa from Ghana to the mouth of the Congo River. reports from the Republic of Guinea may be erroneous. It occurs in shallow waters at depths between 5 and 30 m (16 and 98 ft) where it is associated with reefs and may be found over on rocky bottoms and coral reefs, it has also been recorded in brackish lagoons and occasionally in rivers and in shallow inshore waters.

== Biology ==
Lutjanus endencacanthus is a predatory species which feeds mainly in fishes and crustaceans but its biology is otherwise very poorly known.

== Fisheries and conservation ==
Lutjanus endencacanthus is important to artisanal and subsistence fisheries within its range. The species is known only from museum specimens and its range and taxonomic status are uncertain so the IUCN has classified its status as Data Deficient.
