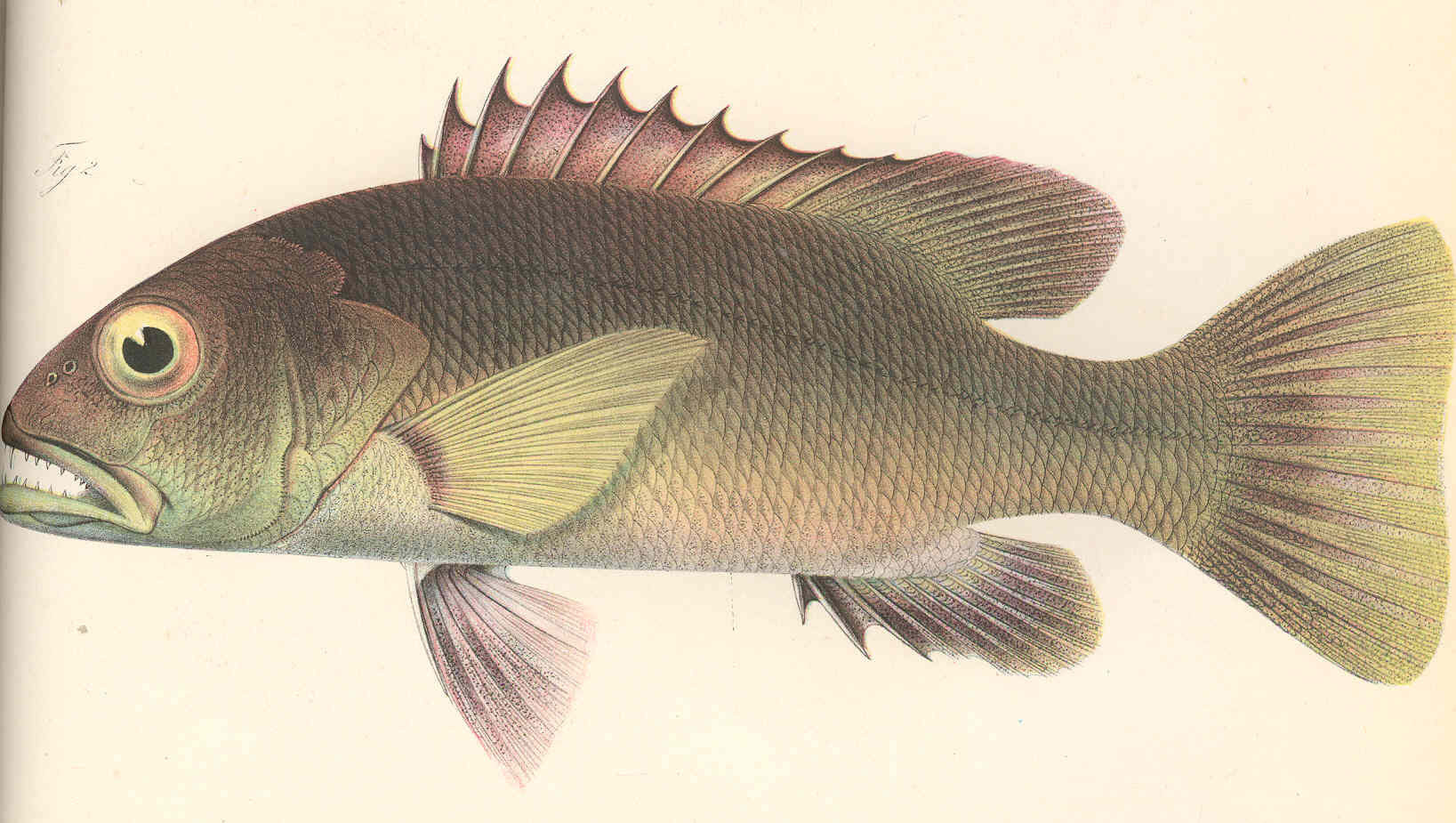

Conservation status
- Data Deficient (IUCN 3.1)

Scientific classification
- Kingdom: Animalia
- Phylum: Chordata
- Class: Actinopterygii
- Order: Acanthuriformes
- Family: Lutjanidae
- Genus: Lutjanus
- Species: L. dentatus

Binomial name
- Lutjanus dentatus (Duméril, 1861)

Synonyms
- Mesoprion dentatus Duméril, 1861; Lutjanus eutactus Bleeker, 1863

= African brown snapper =

Species of fish

The African brown snapper (Lutjanus dentatus) is a species of marine ray-finned fish, a snapper belonging to the family Lutjanidae. It is native to the eastern Atlantic Ocean off the coast of West Africa.

== Taxonomy ==
The African brown snapper was first formally described in 1861 as Mesoprion dentatus by the French zoologist Auguste Duméril with the type locality given as Gorée in Senegal. The specific name dentatus means "toothed" and refers to the large teeth possessed by this species. An examination of a specimen of a vagrant cubera snapper (Lutjanus cyanopterus) from Flores Island in the Azores with a vagrant specimen of this species from Gran Canaria suggested that these may be conspecific, if that is the case then L. dentatus will be a junior synonym of L. cyanopterus. The little known Guinea snapper (Lutjanus endecacanthus) is considered by some authorities to be synonymous with L. dentatus.

== Description ==
The African brown snapper has a relatively deep body with a slightly rounded head. Its mouth extends as far as the centre line of the eye and has thick lips. The notch and knob on the preoperculum are weak. The vomerine teeth are arranged in a triangular patch in adults, chevron shaped in juveniles and the adults sometime have a small rearwards extension. The dorsal fin contains 10 spines and 13-14 soft rays while the anal fin has 3 spines and 8 soft rays. In adults the pectoral fins do not extend as far as the anus and contain 17 rays. The maximum total length recorded for this species is 150 cm (59 in) although 50 cm (20 in) is more typical, the maximum published weight is 50 kg (110 lb). The back and upper flanks of adults are dusky grey in colour fading to whiteish pink on the lower flanks and abdomen. The juveniles have alternating light and dark vertical bars of roughly equal widths on their flanks.

== Distribution and habitat ==
The African brown snapper is found in the eastern Atlantic Ocean. It occurs along the western coast of African from Senegal to Angola, including Bioko and São Tomé and Príncipe. It has occurred in the Canary Islands. This species is found in relatively shallow waters at depths between 2 and 50 m (6 ft 7 in and 164 ft 1 in) normally over rocky and coral reefs but it is also found in brackish lagoons, mangroves and occasionally in rivers.

== Biology ==
The biology of the African brown snapper is little known, it is known to feed on smaller fishes and crustaceans.

== Fisheries and conservation ==
The African brown snapper is fished for by commercial fisheries, along with its congeners. Although it commands high prices it is not as sought after as the African red snapper (Lutjanus agennes). Separate data is not collected on the catch of this species but the fish stocks in West Africa are known to be overexploited. Both commercial trawlers and artisanal fishers fish for this species and some of the catch is exported to Europe. It is also likely that spawning aggregations of snappers are being targeted. The IUCN classify this species as Data Deficient because no separate data is available but they do consider that because of intense fishing pressure and declines in all West African snapper stocks that it may actually be Near Threatened or Vulnerable.
