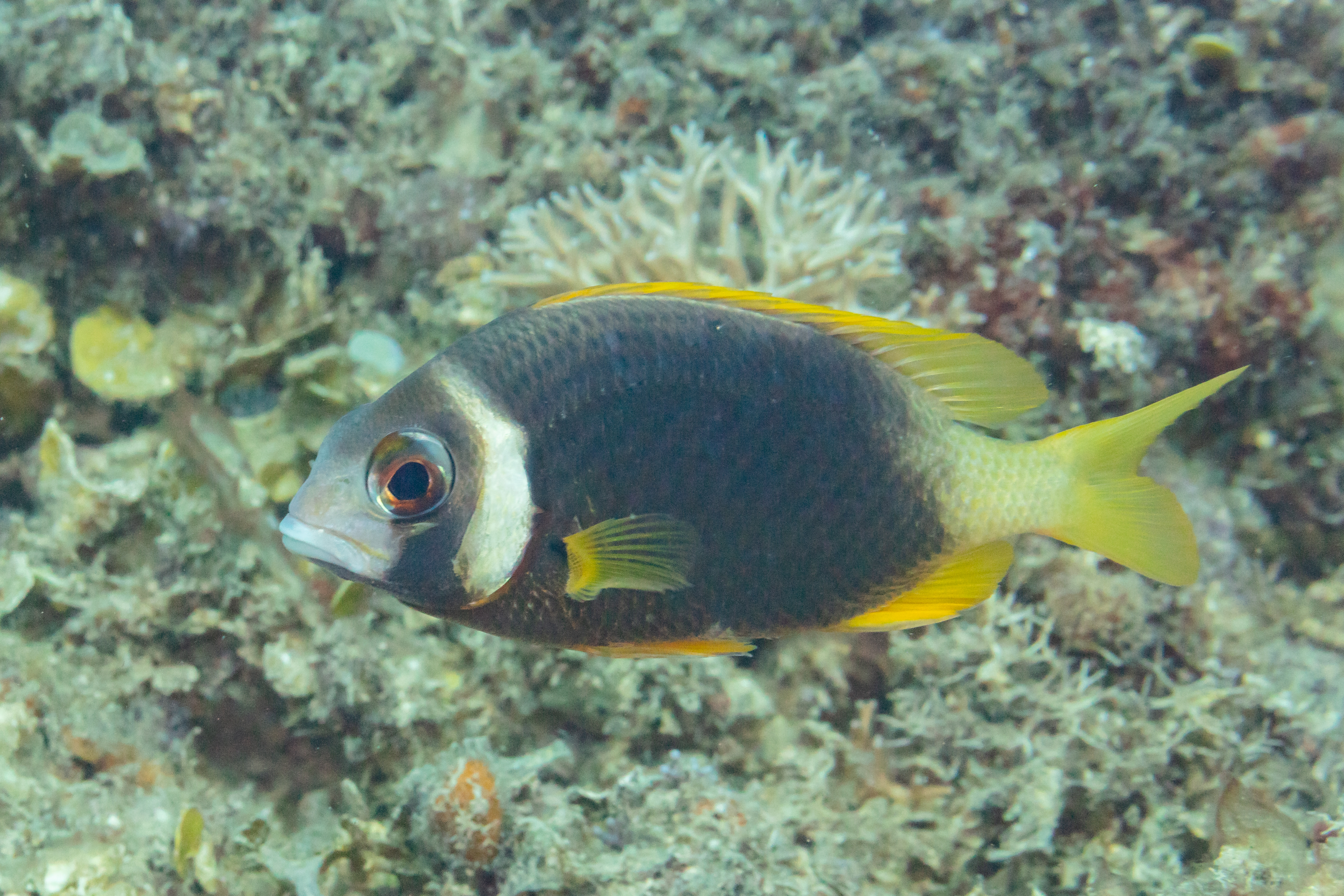

Scientific classification
- Kingdom: Animalia
- Phylum: Chordata
- Class: Actinopterygii
- Division: Teleostei
- Order: Acanthuriformes
- Family: Nemipteridae
- Genus: Scolopsis
- Species: S. curite

Binomial name
- Scolopsis curite Cuvier, 1815

Synonyms
- Scolopsis kurite Cuvier, 1816: .; Scolopsides kurita Cuvier, 1829; Scolopsides ruppelii Cuvier, 1830

= Scolopsis curite =

Species of fish

Scolopsis curite, the whitecheek monocle bream, is a species of marine ray-finned fish belonging to the family Nemipteridae, the threadfin breams. This fish is found in the Indian Ocean.

== Taxonomy ==
Scolopsis curite was first formally described in 1815 by the French zoologist Georges Cuvier following a figure drawn by Patrick Russell of a fish given the name Kurite in Visakhapatnam, India. This taxon was regarded as a synonyms of S. vosmeri but S. vosmerii has been shown to be a species complex of three species in 2022. S. curite in the Indian Ocean, S. vosmeri in the northern Indian Ocean and Indonesia and S. japonica in the Western Pacific Ocean. S. curite and S. japonica are closely related sister species which replace each other geographically.

The type species of the genus Scolopsis is Scolopsis sayanus but this is a synonym of the pirate perch (Aphredoderus sayanus) which is not a member of, or closely related to, the genus Scolopsis. As S. curite is now considered to be a valid species it should be designated the type species of the genus Scolopsis. In 2022 a neotype was designated for this species and its type locality is Puducherry in Tamil Nadu. The 5th edition of Fishes of the World classifies the genus Scolopsis within the family Nemipteridae which it places in the order Spariformes.

== Description ==
Scolopsis curite is very similar to S. vosmeri but it has a wedge shape black spot on the upper pectoral fin base, has no white band underneath the lateral line and in having greenish yellow, rather than black spots on the bases of the scales on the body. The colour of the pelvic and anal fins also differing being yellow rather than reddish brown, the caudal peduncle being yellowish rather than white and the caudal fin being yellow rather than greyish. S. curite is not easy to tell apart from S. japonica as they have very similar colours and patterns, however, in S. japonica the margin of the preoperculum is serrated or has a spiny edge while the preoperculum of S. curite is more robust and rough with a bony margin which has one or two rows of short blunt spines along its whole length.

== Distribution and habitat ==
Scolopsis curite is only found in the Indian Ocean where it occurs along the eastern coast of Africa from KwaZulu Natal and Madagascar north to the Red Sea, although absent from the far northern Red Sea, it occurs in the Persian Gulf and Arabian Sea east to the Andaman Sea. It is found in turbid waters at depths between 1 and 45 m (3 ft 3 in and 147 ft 8 in) over areas of seabed made up of sand and mud close to reefs, or in clear sandy area. Typically found in pairs or singly.
