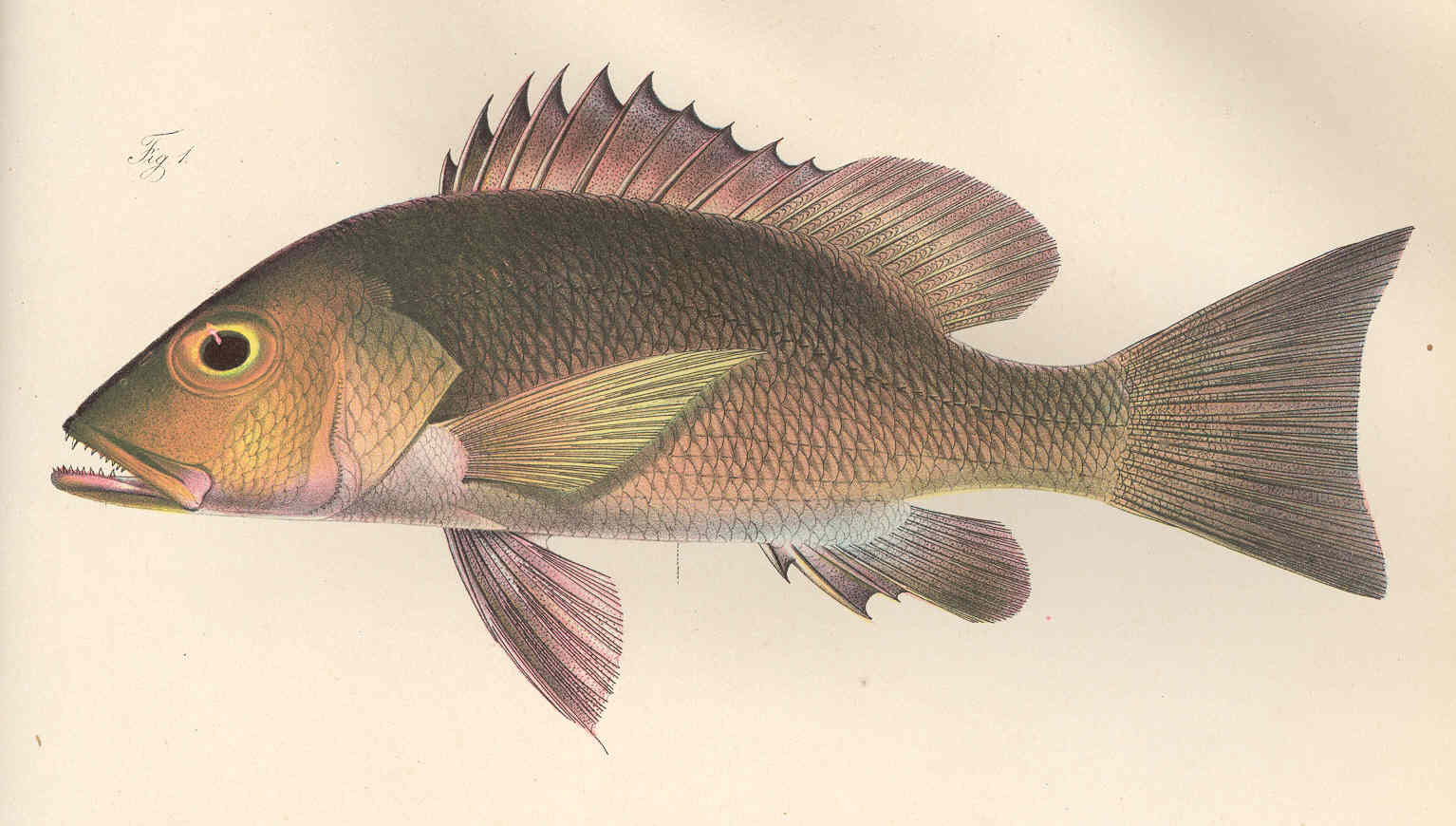

Conservation status
- Data Deficient (IUCN 3.1)

Scientific classification
- Kingdom: Animalia
- Phylum: Chordata
- Class: Actinopterygii
- Order: Acanthuriformes
- Family: Lutjanidae
- Genus: Lutjanus
- Species: L. agennes

Binomial name
- Lutjanus agennes Bleeker, 1863

Synonyms
- Lutjanus modestus Bleeker, 1863

= Lutjanus agennes =

Species of fish

Lutjanus agennes, the African red snapper, Guinean snapper or African cubera snapper, is a species of marine ray-finned fish belonging to the family Lutjanidae, the snappers. It is native to the coastal Atlantic waters of Africa.

== Taxonomy ==
Lutjanus agennes was first formally described in 1863 by the Dutch physician, herpetologist and ichthyologist Pieter Bleeker with the type locality given as "Ashantee in Guinea". Bleeker did not explain the derivation of the specific name but it may be from agenes, which means "of low family", possibly a reference to its similarity to L. modestus, the name modestus meaning the "modest or unassuming one". Bleeker also described L. modestus in 1863 and it is not clear whether this is a synonym of this species or L. endecacanthus.

== Description ==
Lutjanus agennes has a relatively deep body with a pointed snout and a rather angular forehead. The mouth extends back to below the centre of the eye. The vomerine teeth are arranged in a triangular patch which may have a posterior extension. The incision and the knob on the preoperculum are not well developed. The dorsal fin has 10 spines and 13–14 soft rays while the anal fin contains 3 spines and 8 soft rays. The overall colour is reddish brown to slightly orange on the back and upper flanks, shading to pink or whitish on lower flanks and abdomen. The tips of the pelvic fins are rather dark because there is no blue line on the cheeks. The juveniles are marked with 6 to 8 vertical rows of small white spots or slender bars on their flanks. This fish attains a maximum total length of 139 cm (55 in), although 50 cm (20 in) is more typical, and the maximum published weight is 60 kg (130 lb).

== Distribution and habitat ==
Lutjanus agennes is found in the eastern Atlantic Ocean, where it occurs along the western coast of Africa from Senegal to Angola. It also occurs in the Cape Verde Islands and the islands of the Gulf of Guinea. It occurs from the surface down to 80 m (260 ft), over rock substrates and reefs. It can also be found in brackish lagoons and estuaries, particularly in juveniles.

== Biology ==
Lutjanus agennes, like other snappers, is predatory and feeds mainly on fish and crustaceans. This species may form large spawning aggregations away from the coasts, in the open sea. Larger individuals have been observed by fishermen to congregate in large numbers in areas of rocky reefs to spawn. It is thought that the West African snapper is a long-lived species with a lifespan that may exceed 20 years.

== Fisheries and conservation ==
Lutjanus agennes is an important fish for fisheries throughout its range, especially for subsistence fisheries, and it is caught using handlines and fixed bottom nets. The catch is normally sold fresh. It is also caught commercially, and the commercial catch is both consumed internally in West Africa, especially in the Gulf of Guinea and Cape Verde. Some of the catch from Ghana and Senegal is exported to Europe. This species is taken in mixed catch fisheries, and no separate catch statistics are available. Potential spawning aggregations are thought to be targeted in at least one part of their range. Despite the fishing pressure, the African red snapper appears to be common, juveniles are not caught throughout the range of this species. There is some evidence of overfishing as the size of the fish caught is declining in some areas. An example of this is in Ghana, where the average catch sizes are no greater than 60 cm (24 in). The IUCN has listed it as Data Deficient as there is a paucity of information. They suggest that this species should be carefully monitored, as fishing practices in the region, in conjunction with modelling results, predict that there has been a major reduction in the overall biomass of the stocks of this species, and they suggest that it may qualify to be assessed as Near Threatened or worse when more data becomes available. It is a quarry species for recreational anglers in some parts of its range.
