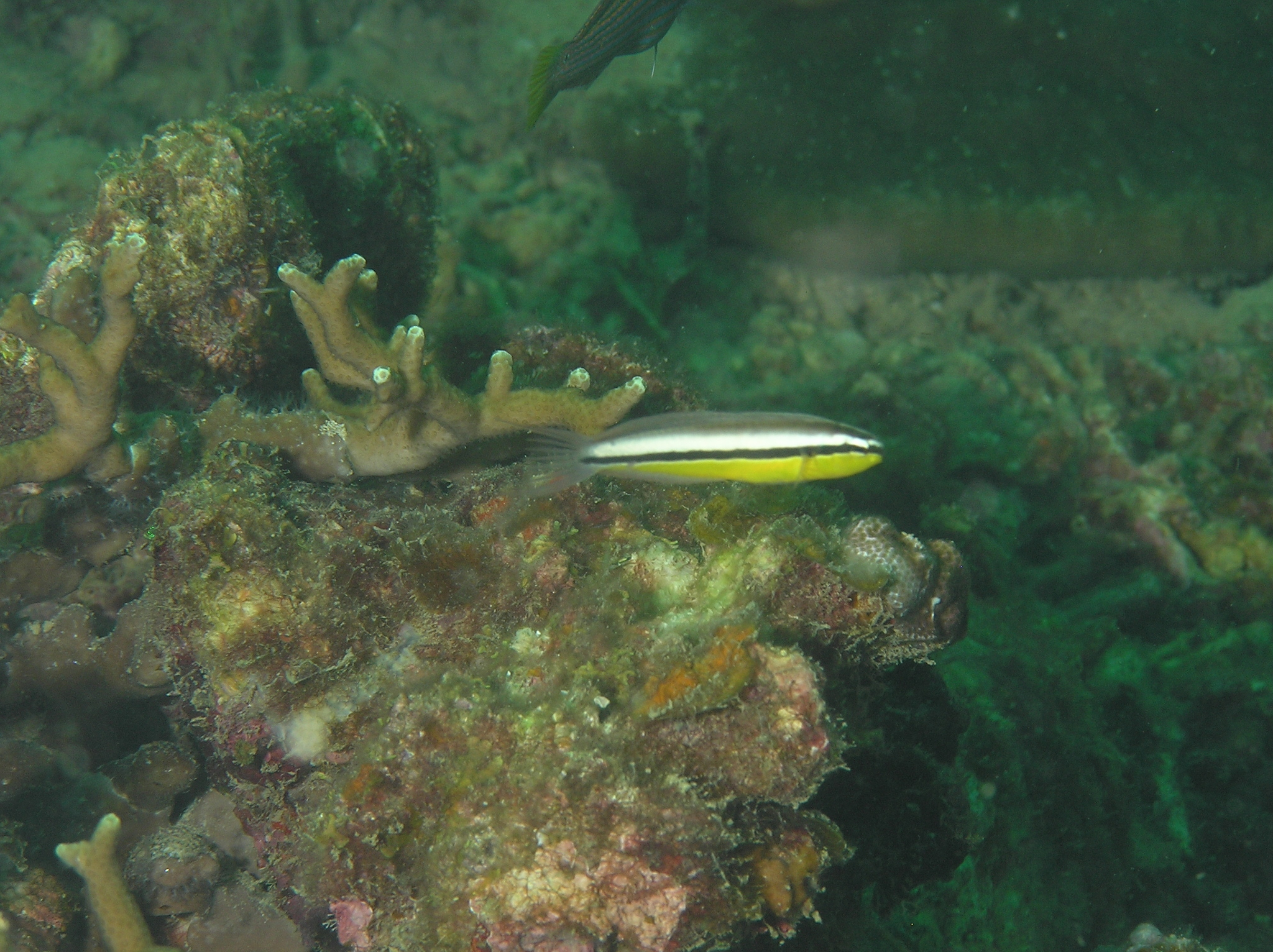

Conservation status
- Least Concern (IUCN 3.1)

Scientific classification
- Kingdom: Animalia
- Phylum: Chordata
- Class: Actinopterygii
- Division: Teleostei
- Order: Blenniiformes
- Family: Blenniidae
- Genus: Meiacanthus
- Species: M. geminatus

Binomial name
- Meiacanthus geminatus Smith-Vaniz, 1976

= Meiacanthus geminatus =

Species of fish

Meiacanthus geminatus is a species of combtooth blenny found in the western central Pacific Ocean where it is known from Darvel Bay, Borneo and Palawan, Philippines. This species grows to a length of 4.7 centimetres (1.9 in) SL.
