= Glossary of ichthyology =

This glossary of ichthyology is a list of definitions of terms and concepts used in ichthyology, the study of fishes.

== A ==
abdomen
Belly.
abdominal
Pertaining to the belly.
actinosts
A series of bones at the base of the pectoral rays.
acuminate
Tapering gradually to a point.
acute
Sharp, pointed.
adipose fin
A small fleshy fin which lacks fin rays.
adnate
Joined together.
adpressed
Pressed against the body.
anal fin
The fin on the median line behind the vent.
anal fin origin
The most anterior point of the anal fin base.
andropodium
A modification of the anal fin of males of certain live-bearing species in the family Goodeidae. It is used to transfer reproductive products to the female during mating.
ankylosed
Grown firmly together.
anterior
Relating to the front portion.
antrose
Turned forward.
approximate
Placed close together.
asperity
Roughness of surface.
asymmetrical
Without symmetry.
attenuate
Tapering to a point, usually in reference to a tail.
axillary
Pertaining to the axilla or upper angle of the pectoral fin.
axillary process
An enlarged, pointed scale projecting from the insertion of the pectoral or pelvic fin.

== B ==
barbel
An elongated fleshy projection, usually about the head.
basal
At or pertaining to the base.
base
The part of a projection (commonly a fin) which is connected to the body.
bathypelagic
Living at a depth between 1000 m and 4000 m, but well off the bottom.
benthic
Bottom-dwelling, living on the sea bed.
benthopelagic
Pertaining to fishes that swim just above the seabed at depths below about 200 m (the edge of the continental shelf).
bicuspid
Having two cusps or points.
bifid
Cleft in two.
bifurcate
Forked, or divided into two parts or branches.
branchial
Pertaining to the gills.
branchial aperture
The gill opening.
branchiostegal membrane
The membrane connecting the branchiostegal rays and enclosing the gill chamber ventrally.
branchiostegals, branchiostegal ray(s)
Bony rays supporting the gill membranes behind the lower jaw.
bristle
A stiff hair-like projection.
buckler
A bony shield.
bycatch
Species other than the target species that are caught incidentally in a trawl.

== C ==
caniniform
Shaped like a canine tooth, conical in form.
carapace
A horny or bony covering encasing the body.
cardiform
Small set conical outgrowths in a close set patch or band; usually refers to a band of small, close-set, conical teeth.
carinate
Keeled, having a ridge along the middle line.
caruncle
A fleshy outgrowth.
caudal
Pertaining to the tail.
caudal fin
The tail fin.
caudal peduncle
The region of the body between the end of the anal fin and the base of the caudal fin.
ciliated
Fringed with eyelash-like projections.
cirri
Small, thin appendages, often subdivided into branches.
cirrus
Singular of cirri.
claspers
The external reproductive organs of male sharks, rays, and chimaeras.
coalesced
Grown together.
compressed
Flattened laterally.
confluent
Joined together.
conical
Cone-shaped, with a cylindrical base and a pointed tip.
corselet
A scaly covering behind the pectorals of some fishes.
countershading
Body colouration which is dark above and lighter below.
crenulate
Having the edge slightly scalloped.
cutaneous
Pertaining to the skin.
ctenoid scale
A rough-edged scale.
cycloid scale
A smooth-edged scale.

== D ==
deciduous
Temporary, falling off.
demersal
Living on or near the sea bed.
dendritic
Resembling a tree or shrub.
denature
The "unfolding" of a protein resulting in a lessening of its biological properties. In the case of some fish toxins, denaturing with hot water can lessen painful symptoms.
dentate
Having tooth-like projections.
denticle, denticulate
A little tooth, having an edge with small projecting teeth, the placoid scales of cartilaginous fishes.
depressed
Flattened from top to bottom.
dermal
Pertaining to the skin.
dewlap
A fold of loose skin.
disc
The flattened head and body of various fishes such as stingrays, which also commonly includes the pectoral and ventral fins.
distal
Remote from the point of attachment.
dorsal
Pertaining to the back.
dorsum
The upper (dorsal) surface of the head or body.
dorsal fin
The fin on a fish's back.
dorsal fin origin
The most anterior point of the dorsal fin base.

== E ==
elasmobranchs
The cartilaginous fishes: sharks, rays, and allies.
electrocyte
A type of cell that generates electricity.
elongate
Extended, drawn out.
emarginate
Having the margin slightly hollowed.
endemic
Restricted to a particular region, for example endemic to Australia.
entire
Having a smooth margin.
epibenthic
Referring to organisms living on the bottom surface.
epipelagic
Referring to organisms living in the region between the surface and 200 m depth.
erectile
Capable of being raised or erected, often referring to spines.
esca
The lure or "bait" on the end of the illicium of some anglerfishes and relatives.
estuarine
Living in estuaries.

== F ==
falcate
Scythe-shaped, long, narrow, and curved.
falciform
Curved like a scythe.
filament
A slender or thread-like structure.
filiform
Thread-like.
fimbriate
Fringed at the margin.
finfold
Embryonic tissue which develops into a fin.
finlet
A small fin, positioned behind the dorsal or anal fins, that is supported by a ray or rays.
fluviatile
Living in rivers.
free rear tips (of fins)
The posterior tip of the fin that is closest to the most posterior point of the fin base.
frontal ridge
A ridge running along the top of the head along the midline.
furcate
Forked.
fusiform
Tapering towards both ends.

== G ==
ganoid scales
Armor-like scales coated with ganoin found in gars and bichirs.
genital papilla
A small, fleshy tube behind the anus in some fishes, from which the sperm or eggs are released; the sex of a fish often can be determined by the shape of its papilla.
gill arches
The bony arches to which the gills are attached.
gill cover
A bony flap that covers the gills; another name for the operculum.
gill filaments
A series of projections along the posterior edge of the gill arch, the site of gas exchange.
gill membranes
Membranes covering the gill openings, attached to the branchiostegals.
gill opening
The opening behind each operculum, leading to the gills.
gill rakers
A series of appendages along the anterior edges of the gill arches.
gills, branchiae
Organs for breathing the oxygen contained in water, and for excreting carbon dioxide from the blood.
glossohyal
The tongue bone.
gonopodium
A modification of the anal fin of males of certain live-bearing species in the families Anablepidae and Poeciliidae. It is used to transfer reproductive products to the female during mating.
gravid
Sexually ripe.
gular region
Pertaining to the region behind the chin and between the sides of the lower jaw.

== H ==
head length
The distance from the tip of the snout (or upper lip) to the most posterior point of the opercular margin.
heterocercal
(of a fin) Not symmetric, e.g. in sharks.
homocercal
(of a fin) Symmetric.
homology
Similarity of features based on common evolutionary descent.
hyperostosis
A condition resulting in enlargement of areas of bone.
hyaline
Translucent or transparent.
hypural joint
The joint between the caudal fin and the last of the vertebrae.
hypural plate
The flattened bony plate at the posterior end of the vertebral column, formed from parts of the posterior vertebrae.

== I ==
ichthyoplankton
The eggs and larvae of fish.
illicium
A "fishing rod-like" appendage on the head, usually a modified dorsal fin spine, used particularly in anglerfishes.
imbricate
Overlapping, like the shingles on a roof.
incised
Having a notched margin (often referring to fin membranes).
incisors
The front or cutting teeth.
inferior
Pertaining to the lower side (usually of the head).
interdorsal
Between the dorsal fins.
interorbital
The space between the orbits.
intromittent organ
A structure to facilitate sperm transfer in some internally fertilizing species.
iris lappet
A fleshy flap or lobe-like structure in the eye, short and rounded, simple or multiply branched.
isthmus
The fleshy projection of the body separating the gill openings.

== J ==
jugular
Pertaining to the throat.
juxtaposed
(of two or more objects) Placed near each other.

== K ==
kidneys
Organs involved in excretion and regulation of water balance.

== L ==
lanceolate
Spear-shaped; gradually tapering toward the extremity.
labial
Pertaining to the lips.
labial furrows
Shallow grooves around the lips.
labial papillae
Small fleshy projections around the lips.
lateral
At or toward the side.
lateral line
A series of muciferous tubes forming a raised line along the side of the body.
leptocephalic
Tallness and narrowness of the skull. In fish, the term usually refers to an "elongate highly compressed transparent, ribbon-like larval stage".
liver
A digestive and storage organ.
longitudinal series (scales)
The number of scale rows above the lateral line from the first pored lateral line scale to the caudal fin base.
lunate
Shaped like a crescent moon, with long upper and lower lobes.

== M ==
maxilla, maxillary
The upper jaw, or pertaining thereto.
maxillae, maxillaries
The hindmost bones of the upper jaw; preceded by the premaxillaries.
median, medially
Pertaining to the middle.
median fins
Fins located on the median line of the fish; the dorsal, anal and caudal fins.
mediolateral
Between the middle and the sides.
melanophore
A cell (chromatophore) containing melanin or other black pigment.
mesocoracoid
A bone of the pectoral arch or shoulder girdle.
mesopelagic
Refers to the region of the open ocean between 200 m and 1000 m in depth.
mesopelagic fishes
Fishes that live in the mesopelagic zone.
midwater
The middle stratum of water, well below the surface and well above the seabed. See also mesopelagic.
midwater fishes
Fishes that live in the midwater.
molars
Blunt and rounded grinding teeth.
morphology
Form and structure of an organism.
muciferous
Producing or containing mucus or slime.
myotomes
Blocks of lateral trunk muscles.
myomeres
Blocks of muscle corresponding to number of vertebrae, easily seen in larval fishes and used for identifying specimens.

== N ==
nape
Upper surface of the body behind the head and before the dorsal fin.
nasal
Pertaining to the nostrils.
nasoral
Between the nostrils and mouth.
nictitating membrane
An inner eyelid.
notochord
A rudimentary of embryonic spinal column.
nuchal
Pertaining to the nape.

== O ==
obsolete
Faintly marked; scarcely evident.
obtuse
Blunt.
occipital
Pertaining to the posterior part of the skull.
ocellus
An eye-like spot.
ocular
Pertaining to the eye.
odontode
A dermal tooth.
oesophagus
The gullet.
opercle
The large bone which forms the upper posterior part of the operculum.
operculum
The bony flap that covers the gills.
opercular
Pertaining to the operculum.
opercular spine
A spine projecting from the operculum.
orbit
The eye socket.
origin
The most anterior point of a fin base.
osseous
Bony.
ovate
Egg-shaped.

== P ==
palate
The roof of the mouth.
palatines
The set of bones on each side of the palate.
papilla (papillae)
A small fleshy projection(s).
papillose
Covered with papillae.
pectoral
Pertaining to the breast.
pectoral fins
The anterior or uppermost of the paired fins, which correspond to the anterior limbs of the higher vertebrates.
pectoral girdle
The bones to which the pectoral fin is attached.
peduncle
Usually referred to as the caudal peduncle, the region of the body between the end of the anal fin and the base of the caudal fin.
pelagic
Living on or in the open seas.
pelvic girdle
The bones to which the ventral fins are attached.
pelvic fins
Paired fins behind or below the pectoral fins.
pharyngeal bones
Bones behind the gills in the oesophagus or gullet.
pharyngeal teeth
Teeth within the pharynx.
pharynx
The back part of the throat, into which the gill slits open.
photophore
A circular light-producing organ on the surface of a fish.
placoid scales
Teeth-like scales found in sharks and rays.
posterior
Towards the hind end of the fish.
postorbital
Behind the eye.
precaudal
Anterior to the tail portion.
premaxillaries
Two bones forming the front portion of the upper jaw.
preocular spine
A spine positioned above and in front of the eye.
preopercle, preoperculum
The bone between the cheek and the gill cover.
preopercular spine
A spine projecting from the preopercule (see preopercle).
preorbital
The area under and in front of the eyes.
protractile
Capable of extending forward.
protrusible
Capable of extending forward, often referring to the jaws of fishes.
proximal
Nearest.
pseudobranchiae
Small gills developed on the inner side of the gill cover.
pseudoclasper
Stiff, ossified lobes or prongs in the tip of the intromittent organ.
pterygiophore
An internal cartilage or bone that supports a median fin ray or spine.
pyloric caecae
Finger-like pouches connected with the alimentary canal (the gut).

== R ==
ramus
One branch or one half of the jaw.
ray
A jointed, segmented rod which supports a fin.
redd
Spawning nest made by some fishes.
retrose
Turned backward.
rostrum
A projecting snout or beak.
rugose
Rough.

== S ==
scalation
The pattern/arrangement/presence of scales.
scute
Any external horny or bony plate.
serrate
Notched like a saw.
setae
Bristles or hairs.
soft dorsal
The posterior part of the dorsal fin which is composed of jointed rays.
spatulate
Shovel-like; having a broad, flat, and rounded shape.
spine
A sharp projecting point; an unjointed support in the anterior portions of the dorsal and anal fins.
spinous, spiniform, spinate
Spine-like or composed of spines.
spinous dorsal
The anterior part of the dorsal fin supported by spines.
spiracles
Respiratory openings behind the eyes in sharks and rays.
standard length (SL)
The length of a fish measured from the tip of the snout to the posterior extremity of the hypurals, the expanded bones at the end of the backbone that support the caudal fin.
submarginal
Almost at the edge.
suborbital
Below the eye.
superior
Above or on the upper surface.
supracleithrum
The bone forming a connection between the back of the skull and the pectoral girdle.
supralateral
Above the side.
supramaxillary
A supplemental bone lying along the upper edge of the maxillary.
supraocular
Positioned above the eye.
supraorbital
Above the eye.
supraorbital tentacle
A flap or filament of skin positioned above the eye.
suprascapular
A bone uniting the shoulder girdle with the skull.
suture
The line of union of two bones or plates.
swimbladder
A sac filled with gas, lying beneath the backbone.
symphysis
The point of junction of the two sides of the jaw.
symmetrical
Similarly arranged on both sides.

== T ==
teleost
A member of Teleostei, an infraclass containing most of the bony fishes.
terminal
At the end.
tessellated
Marked with little checks or squares, like tiles.
Tholichthys
A larval stage of butterflyfish and scats in which the larva is armoured with large bony plates which extend onto the body from the head, the head also being enclosed in bony armour which is frequently silvery in colour. The tholichthys armour plates are lost as the larva metamorphoses into the juvenile stage.
thoracic
Pertaining to the chest.
thorax
The chest region, just behind the head.
total length
The length from the tip of the snout to the tip of the tail.
transverse
Crosswise.
trilobate
Having three lobes.
tricuspid
Having three cusps or points.
truncate
Terminating abruptly, as if cut off square.
trunk
The region of a fish between the head and tail, or the last gill slit and vent.
tubercle
A small, usually hard excrescence or lump.
tubiform, tubuliform
Resembling a tube.
type locality
The location from which the type specimen was collected.

== U ==
undulated
Waved.
urogenital papilla
A papilla through which the urinary waste and gametes leave the body.

== V ==
vent
The external opening of the alimentary canal, the anus.
ventral
Pertaining to the abdominal or lower surface.
ventral fins
Paired fins behind or below the pectoral fins.
vertical fins
Fins on the median line of the body; the dorsal, anal, and caudal fins.
vestigial
Reduced or very poorly developed.
villiform teeth
Small, slender teeth forming velvety bands.
vomer
A bone forming the front part of the roof of the mouth.
vomerine teeth
Teeth on the vomer.

== W ==
Weberian apparatus
An adaptation found in Ostariophysi to improve hearing; includes the Weberian ossicles.
