= I. sinensis =

I. sinensis may refer to:

- Inimicus sinensis, the spotted ghoul, Chinese stinger, spotted stingerfish or spotted stonefish, a venomous fish species
- Ixobrychus sinensis, the yellow bittern, a bird species breeding in tropical Asia from India, Pakistan, and Sri Lanka, east to Japan and Indonesia

== See also ==
- Flora Sinensis
