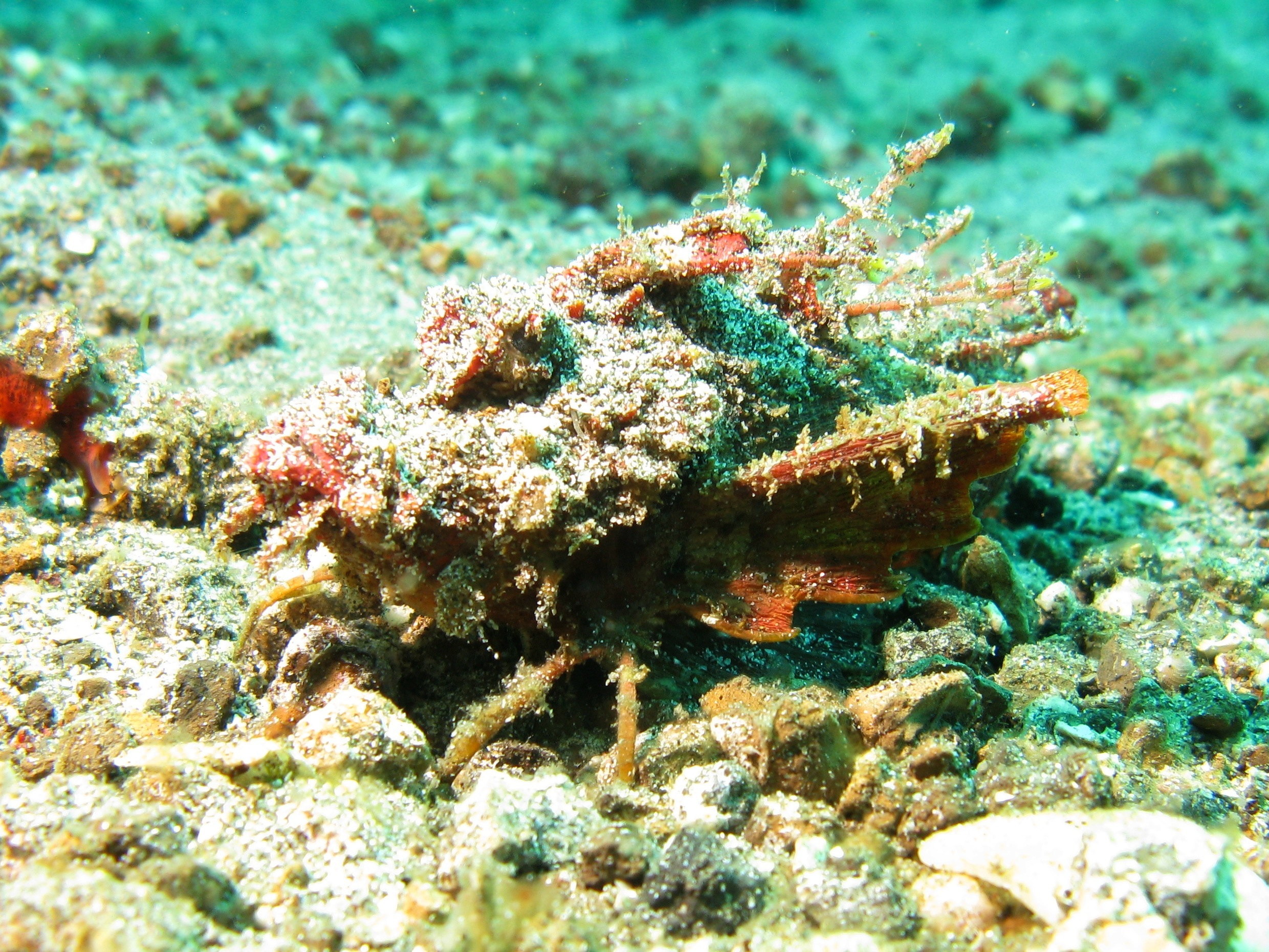

Scientific classification
- Domain: Eukaryota
- Kingdom: Animalia
- Phylum: Chordata
- Class: Actinopterygii
- Order: Perciformes
- Family: Scorpaenidae
- Genus: Inimicus
- Species: I. didactylus

Binomial name
- Inimicus didactylus (Pallas, 1769)

Synonyms
- Scorpaena didactyla Pallas, 1769

= Inimicus didactylus =

Species of fish

Inimicus didactylus, also known as sea goblin, demon stinger or devil stinger or red sea walkman, is a Western Pacific member of the Inimicus genus of venomous fishes, closely related to the true stonefishes. It can reach a body length of 25 cm (10 in) and is irregularly surfaced with spines and a knobby appearance. The fish has venomous spines to ward off enemies. The fish are nocturnal, and often dig themselves partially into the sandy seabed during the day. The body is red or sandy yellow and well camouflaged on sandy and coral seabeds.

== Taxonomy ==
Inimicus didactylus was first formally described as Scorpaena didactyla in 1769 by the German naturalist Peter Simon Pallas, with the type locality given as the Indian Ocean, thought to be Indonesia. The specific name didactylus means "two fingered", an allusion to the two detached, lowest pectoral fin rays.

== Physical description ==
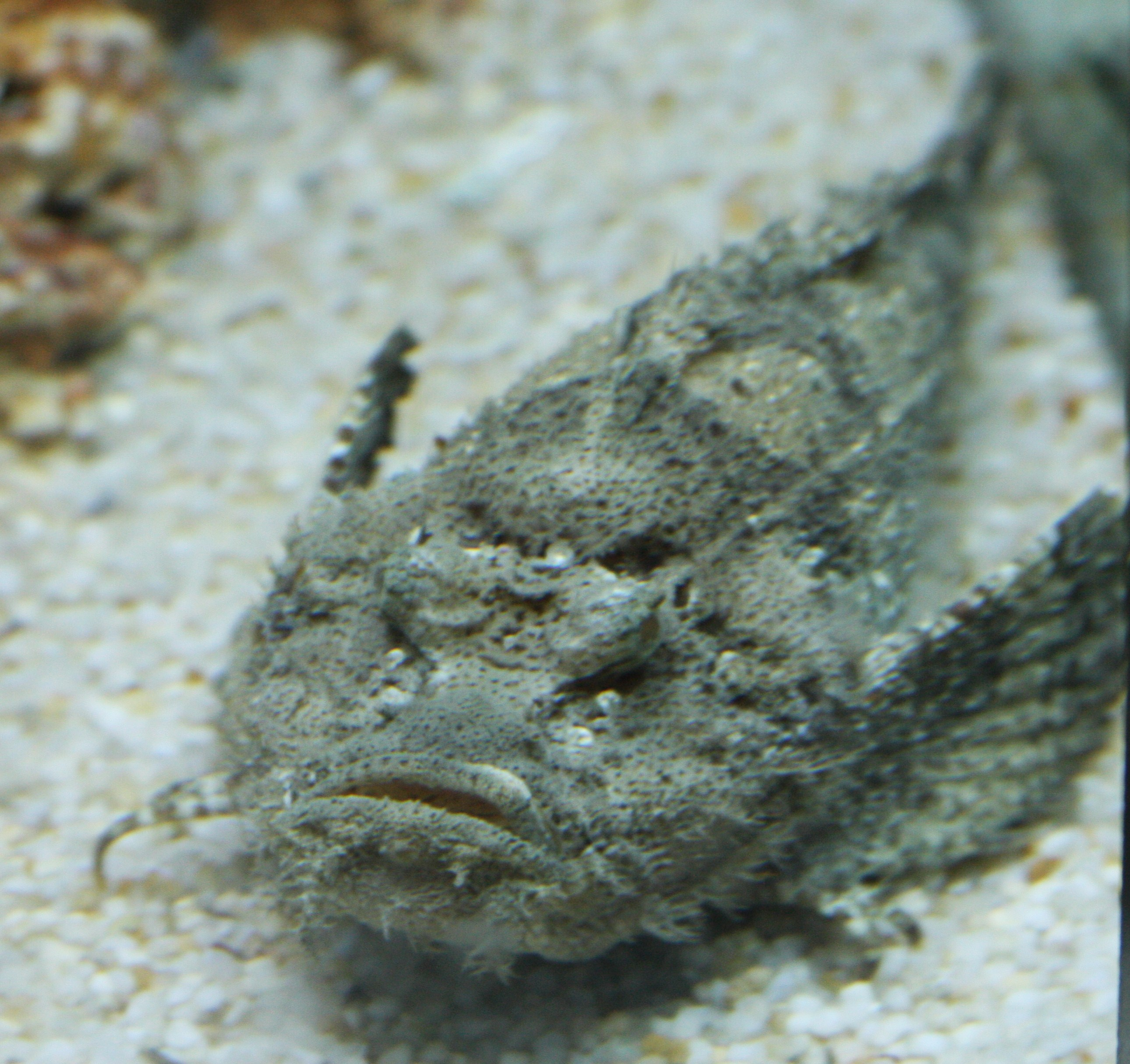
Inimicus didactylus

Inimicus didactylus adults can attain a body length of up to 26 centimeters in length. The body color is red or sandy yellow with light blotches, and very similar to that of the surrounding sandy or coral seabed in which they are found. This coloration acts as a camouflage which renders them extremely difficult to detect in their natural habitat. The skin is without scales except along the lateral line, and is covered with venomous spines and wartlike glands which give it a knobby appearance. The head is flattened, depressed and concave. The eyes, mouth and nostrils project upwards and outwards from the dorsal aspect of the head. Sexual dimorphism is not believed to occur in this species.

Fin morphology:

- dorsal fin: composed of 15 to 17 spines and 7 to 9 soft rays.
- caudal fin: composed of 2–4 spines and 4-14 soft rays, with dark bands at basal and subterminal positions.
- pelvic fin: composed of one spine and 3–5 soft rays.
- pectoral fin: composed of 10–12 rays. The two most caudal rays of each pectoral fin are detached from the rest of the fin, and angled in a ventral direction. The fish employ these two rays to prop up the forward part of their body, as well as to "walk" along the bottom of the substrate. The ventral surface of the pectoral fins bears broad black bands containing smaller, lighter spots at the basal and distal ends. In I. filamentosus, these bands are attenuated, while the bands of I. sinensis have yellow spots on them. This is a key feature for distinguishing the two species, which are otherwise nearly identical.

== Behavior ==
Inimicus didactylus is a piscivorous ambush predator. It is nocturnal and typically lies partially buried on the sea floor or on a coral head during the day, covering itself with sand and other debris to further camouflage itself. It has no known natural predators. When disturbed by a scuba diver or a potential predator, it fans out its brilliantly colored pectoral and caudal fins as a warning. Once dug in, it is very reluctant to leave its hiding place. When it does move, it displays an unusual mechanism of subcarangiform locomotion — it crawls slowly along the seabed, employing the four lower rays (two on each side) of its pectoral fins as legs. Its dorsal spines are venomous.

== See also ==
- Ambush predator
- Demersal fish
