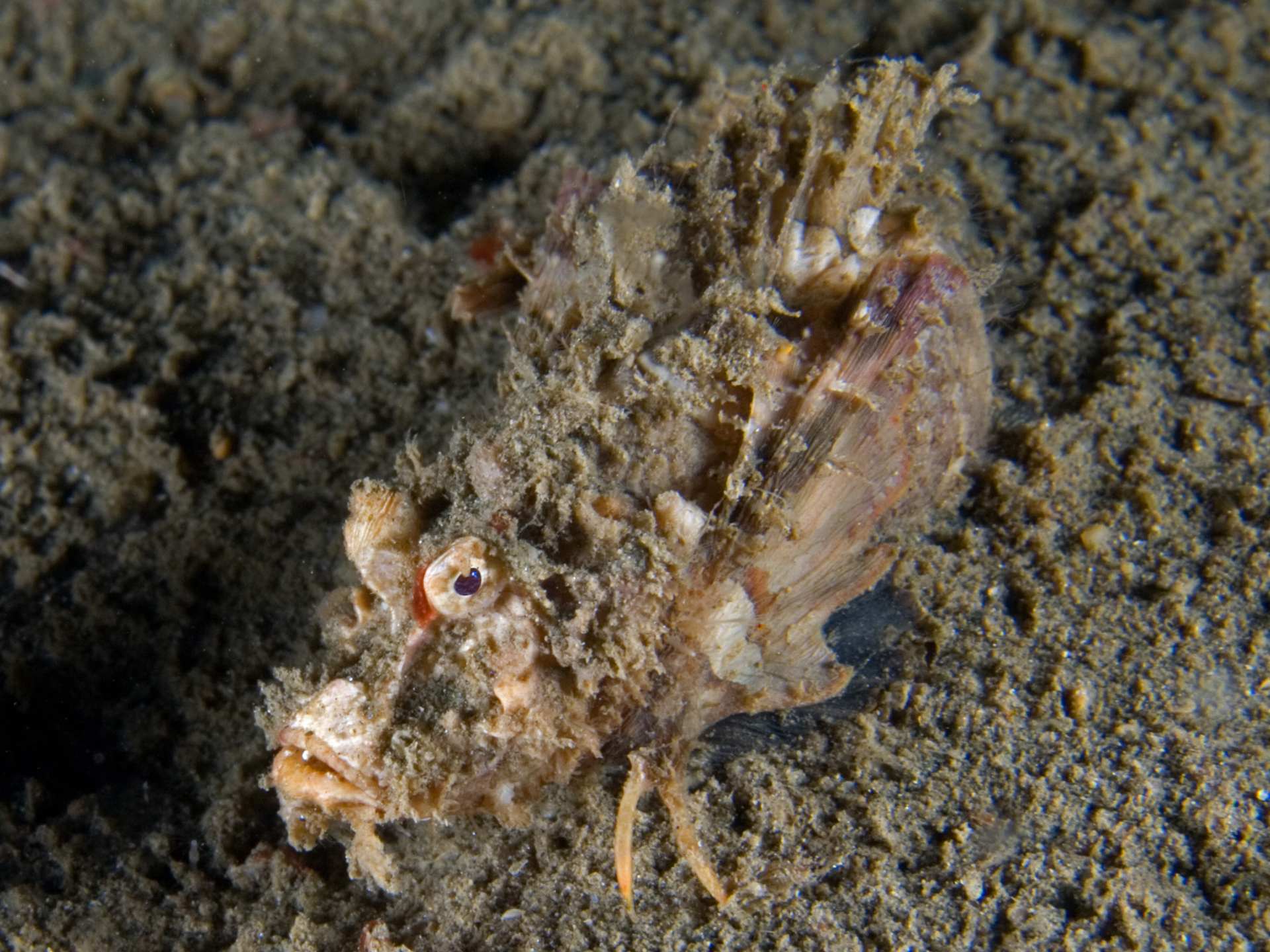
- Demon stinger, Inimicus didactylus

Scientific classification
- Kingdom: Animalia
- Phylum: Chordata
- Class: Actinopterygii
- Order: Perciformes
- Family: Synanceiidae
- Subfamily: Choridactylinae
- Genus: Inimicus; D. S. Jordan & Starks, 1904

Type species
- Pelor japonicum Cuvier, 1829

Species
- See text

Synonyms
- Chorismopelor Chevey, 1927; Pelor Cuvier, 1829; Simopias Gill, 1905

= Inimicus =

Genus of fishes

Inimicus is a genus of marine ray-finned fishes, it is one of two genera in the tribe Choridactylini, one of the three tribes which are classified within the subfamily Synanceiinae within the family Scorpaenidae, the scorpionfishes and their relatives. These venomous, benthic fishes are found on sandy or silty substrates of lagoon and seaward reefs, in coastal regions of tropical oceans. The ten described species are collectively known by various common names, including ghoul, goblinfish, sea goblin, spiny devilfish, stinger, and stingfish.

== Taxonomy ==
Inimicus was first described as a genus in 1904 by the American ichthyologists David Starr Jordan and Edwin Chapin Starks with the type species designated as Pelor japonicum, which had been described by Georges Cuvier in 1829 from the seas of China and Japan. It is one of two genera in the tribe Choridactylini within the subfamily Synanceiinae of the family Scorpaenidae. However, some authorities classify this taxon as a subfamily Choridactylinae within the family Synanceiidae. The genus name inimicus is Latin for "foe" or "enemy", Fishermen feared these fishes because of their venomous spines.

== Species ==
The members of the genus Inimicus are nearly identical in appearance and behavior, and often confused with one another. There are currently 10 recognized species in this genus:

Species	Common name	Habitat	Distribution	IUCN status
Inimicus brachyrhynchus (Bleeker, 1874)		Marine; tropical; reef-dwelling; demersal	Western Central Pacific	NE*
Inimicus caledonicus (Sauvage, 1878)	Chinese ghoul, Caledonian stinger, demon stinger	Marine; tropical; reef-dwelling; demersal	Eastern Indian Ocean: Andaman and Nicobar islands. Western Pacific: Australia, Papua New Guinea and New Caledonia.	LC
Inimicus cuvieri (J. E. Gray, 1835)		Marine; tropical; reef-dwelling; demersal	Western Pacific: South China Sea	NE
Inimicus didactylus (Pallas, 1769)	Goblinfish, popeyed sea goblin, demon stinger, devil stinger, longsnout stinger, spiny devilfish, bearded ghoul	Marine; tropical; reef-dwelling; demersal	Eastern Indian and Western Pacific oceans	NE
Inimicus filamentosus (G. Cuvier, 1829)	Filament-finned stinger, barred ghoul, two-stick stingfish, devil scorpionfish	Marine; tropical; reef-dwelling; demersal	Western Indian Ocean: Red Sea and East Africa to Maldives	LC
Inimicus gruzovi Mandritsa, 1991		Marine; tropical; reef-dwelling; demersal	Western Central Pacific	NE
Inimicus japonicus (G. Cuvier, 1829)	Devil stinger	Marine; tropical; reef-dwelling; demersal	Indo-West Pacific: Japan and East China Sea	NE
Inimicus joubini (Chevey, 1927)		Marine; tropical; reef-dwelling; demersal	Northwest Pacific: Japan and Vietnam	NE
Inimicus sinensis (Valenciennes, 1833)	Spotted ghoul, spotted stonefish	Marine; tropical; reef-dwelling; demersal		LC
Inimicus smirnovi Mandritsa, 1990		Marine; tropical; reef-dwelling; demersal	Western Central Pacific	NE

NE: Not Evaluated

Species no longer recognized:

- Inimicus barbatus (De Vis, 1884) is a jr. synonym of Inimicus caledonicus
- Inimicus dactylus (Cornic, 1987) is a jr. synonym of Inimicus filamentosus

== Geographic distribution ==
Members of the genus Inimicus are distributed mainly in warm tropical waters in the coastal regions of Indo-Pacific oceans. Their range does however extend a little into the subtropical zone. The waters of the Red Sea off the coast of Egypt appear to mark the westernmost limit of their range, while specimens have been reported as far to the east as New Caledonia. The northern coast of New South Wales, Australia marks the southernmost extent of their range, which extends as far to the north as Japan's Aomori, the northernmost prefecture of Japan's main island. Inimicus are benthic fishes, living mainly on the bottom of mangrove swamps and coral reefs, at depths between 5 and 450 meters.

== Description ==
Adults are typically 13–25 centimeters in length, and can weigh up to 480 grams. The body color can be a dull yellow, gray, brown, or rust in color with light blotches, and very similar to that of the surrounding sandy or coral seabed in which they are found. This coloration acts as a camouflage which renders them extremely difficult to detect in their natural habitat. The skin is without scales except along the lateral line, and is covered with venomous spines and wartlike glands which give it a knobby appearance. The head is flattened, depressed and concave. The eyes, mouth and nostrils project upwards and outwards from the dorsal aspect of the head. Sexual dimorphism in this genus was once unreported; however, it has been confirmed that Inimicus sinensis is sexually dimorphic.

Fin morphology:

- dorsal fin: composed of 15 to 17 spines and 7 to 9 soft rays.
- caudal fin: composed of 2–4 spines and 4–14 soft rays, with dark bands at basal and subterminal positions.
- pelvic fin: composed of one spine and 3–5 soft rays.
- pectoral fin: composed of 10–12 rays. The two most caudal rays of each pectoral fin are detached from the rest of the fin, and angled in a ventral direction. The fish employ these two rays to prop up the forward part of their body, as well as to "walk" along the bottom of the substrate. The ventral surface of the pectoral fins bears broad black bands containing smaller, lighter spots at the basal and distal ends. In I. filamentosus, these bands are attenuated, while the bands of I. sinensis have yellow spots on them. This is a key feature for distinguishing the two species, which are otherwise nearly identical.

== Behavior ==
Inimicus are piscivorous ambush predators. They are nocturnal and typically lie partially buried on the sea floor or on a coral head during the day, covering themselves with sand and other debris to further camouflage themselves. They have no known natural predators. When threatened, they spread their brilliantly colored pectoral and caudal fins as a warning. Once dug in, they are very reluctant to leave their hiding places. When they do move, they display an unusual mechanism of subcarangiform locomotion---they crawl slowly along the seabed, employing the four lower rays (two on each side) of their pectoral fins as legs.

The paired pectoral fins of these fishes are a remarkable example of their adaptation to life in a benthic environment. No longer useful or necessary for aiding the animal in maneuvering within the water column, the fins have taken on a number of other functions useful to life as a demersal fish. Among these include probing for food items, propping the forward part of the body away from the bottom, and the aforementioned subcarangiform locomotion.

Inimicus is not the only fish that demonstrate this type of ambulation; it has been extensively described in other related benthic Scorpaeniformes fish such as the Sea robin, Flying gurnards, and the Tub Gurnard, Chelidonichthys lucerna. This type of locomotion, based on voluntary and coordinated movements of paired pectoral fins, is believed by some to be a precursor to the later development of similar ambulation in terrestrial vertebrates.

== Relevance to humans ==
Like all known members of the family Synanceiidae, all members of the genus Inimicus possess a complex and extremely potent venom. It is stored in glands at the bases of needle-like spines in their dorsal fins. Upon contact with the dorsal fin, the fish can deliver a very painful, potentially fatal, sting. The genus name means enemy in Latin.

Despite the obvious risks, one species of Inimicus, I. japonicum, is commercially cultured in Japan. It is used as a food fish there, and it also has applications in Chinese medicine.

== Treatment of envenomation ==
Envenomation by Inimicus species is characterized by immediate and severe local pain. Medical aid must be sought at the earliest opportunity after envenomation. Recommended first aid treatment includes immersion of the affected area in hot water. Immersing the injured area in water at a temperature of at least 45 °C (113 °F) can partially denature the proteolytic enzymes in the venom. Some relief can also be obtained by infiltrating the envenomation site with a local anesthetic. For more extreme cases, an intramuscular injection of a specific horse-derived antivenom can be lifesaving. Tetanus toxoid vaccine should also be administered, if indicated. Surviving victims often suffer localized tissue necrosis and nerve damage, leading to atrophy of adjoining muscle tissues.

== Gallery ==
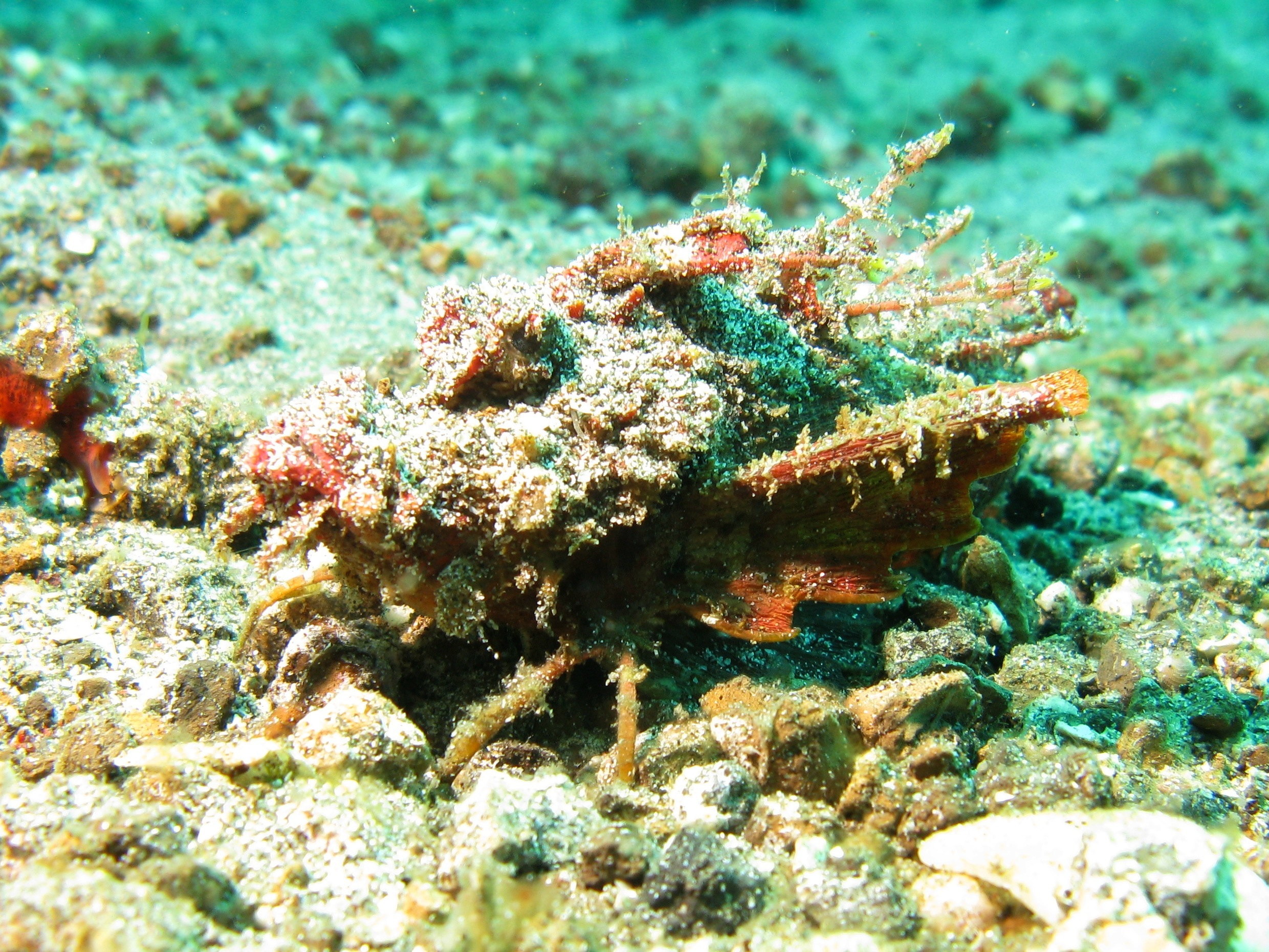
Inimicus didactylus (goblinfish or popeyed sea goblin)

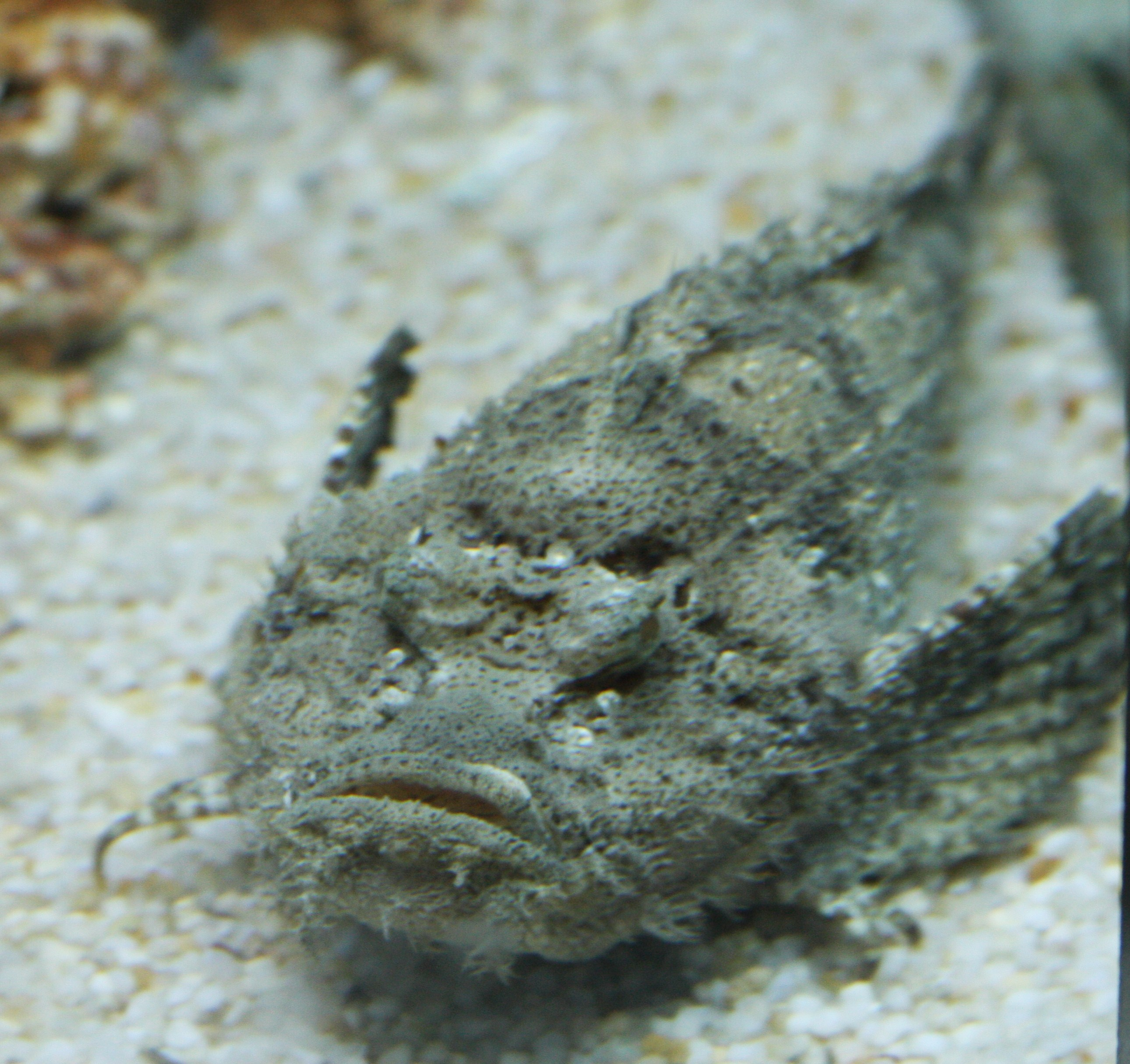
Inimicus didactylus (goblinfish or popeyed sea goblin)

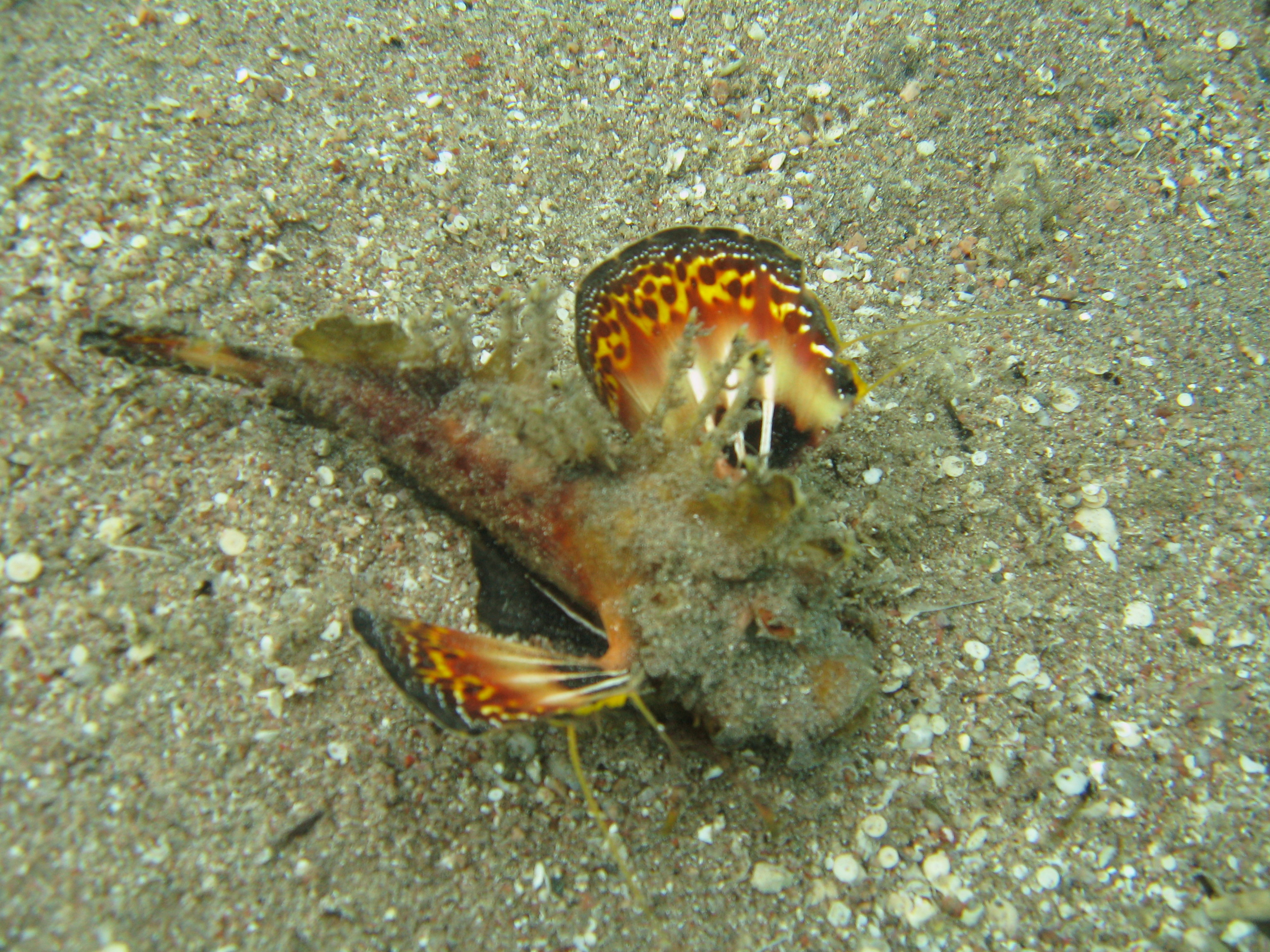
Inimicus filamentosus (filament-finned stinger or two-stick stingfish)

Click here to see more photographs of various specimens of the genus Inimicus.
