= Choridactylus =

Scientific classification
- Kingdom: Animalia
- Phylum: Chordata
- Class: Actinopterygii
- Order: Perciformes
- Family: Synanceiidae
- Subfamily: Choridactylinae
- Genus: Choridactylus; J. Richardson, 1848

Type species
- Choridactylus multibarbus Richardson, 1848

Synonyms
- Choridactylodes Gilchrist, 1902

Genus of fishes

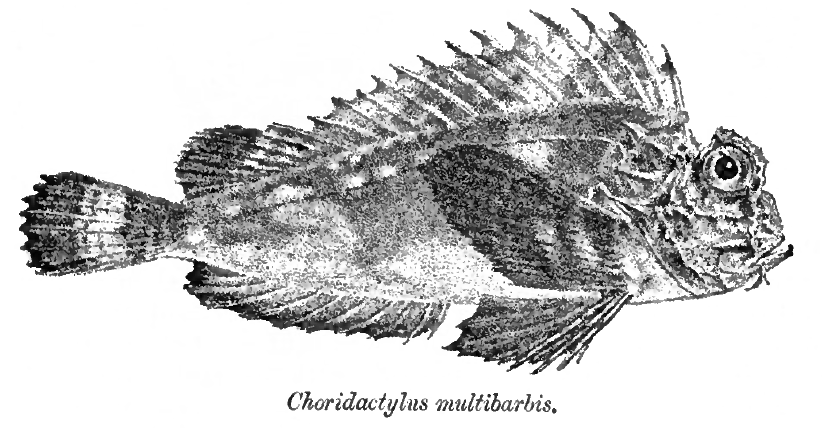
An 1848 illustration of Choridactylus multibarbarus

Choridactylus is a genus of marine ray-finned fishes, it is one of two genera in the tribe Choridactylini, one of the three tribes which are classified within the subfamily Synanceiinae within the family Scorpaenidae, the scorpionfishes and their relatives. They are commonly known as stingfishes. They are found in the Indo-West Pacific.

== Taxonomy ==
Choridactylus was first described as a genus in 1848 by the Scottish naval surgeon, Arctic explorer and naturalist John Richardson as a monotypic genus. Its only species was Choridactylus multibarbus which Richardson had also described in 1848 with its type locality given as the "Sea of China". It is one of two genera in the tribe Choridactylini within the subfamily Synanceiinae of the family Scorpaenidae. However, some authorities classify this taxon as a subfamily Choridactylinae within the family Synanceiidae. The generic name is made up of choris, meaning "separated", and dactylus, which means "finger", and allusion to the detached pectoral fin rays of C. multibarbus, a feature which "readily distinguished" it from other stonefishes known to Richardson.

== Species ==
There are currently four recognized species in this genus:

- Choridactylus lineatus Poss & Mee, 1995 (Lined stingfish)
- Choridactylus multibarbus J. Richardson, 1848 (Orangebanded stingfish)
- Choridactylus natalensis (Gilchrist, 1902) (Threestick stingfish)
- Choridactylus striatus Mandritsa, 1993

== Characteristics ==
Choridactylus stingfishes have 12-15 spines and 8-10 soft rays in the dorsal fin with 2 spines and 8-10 soft rays in the anal fin. The pectoral fins have 12 fin rays with the 3 lower rays being separated. They have small blunt heads with bulging eyes with an occipital depression. The mouth is small and slightly oblique with villiform teeth on the jaws with no vomerine teeth or palatine teeth. The body has small tentacles or skin flaps on the lower jaw, eye, spiny dorsal fin and spiny anal fin. There are tufts on the lateral line and upper body. These fishes vary in size from a total length of 14 cm (5.5 in) in C. multibarbus and C. natalensis to 25 cm (9.8 in) in C. lineatus.

== Distribution and habitat ==
Choridactylus stingfishes are found in the Indian and Pacific Oceans, C. multibarbus is widespread reaching from Red Sea to the Philippines but the other three species are restricted to the western Indian Ocean. These fishes occur in shallow waters over sandy substrates.
