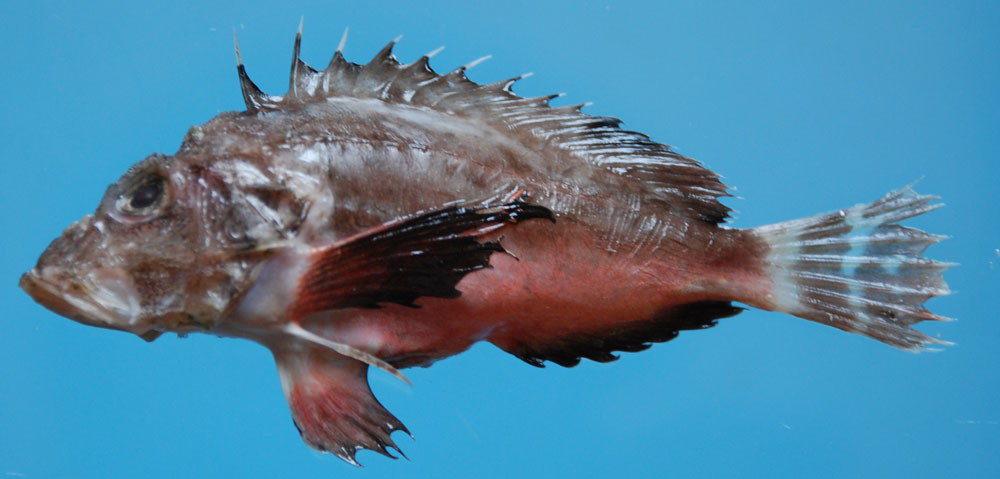

Conservation status
- Least Concern (IUCN 3.1)

Scientific classification
- Kingdom: Animalia
- Phylum: Chordata
- Class: Actinopterygii
- Order: Perciformes
- Family: Synanceiidae
- Genus: Minous
- Species: M. monodactylus

Binomial name
- Minous monodactylus (Bloch & Schneider, 1801)

Synonyms
- Scorpaena monodactyla Bloch & Schneider, 1801; Minous woora Cuvier, 1829; Scorpaena biaculeata Kuhl & van Hasselt, 1829; Minous adamsii Richardson, 1848; Minous blochi Kaup, 1858; Minous oxycephalus Bleeker, 1876; Minous echigonius Jordan & Starks, 1904

= Minous monodactylus =

Species of fish

Minous monodactylus, the grey stingfish or grey goblinfish, is a species of marine ray-finned fishes, it is the only genus in the tribe Minoini, one of the three tribes which are classified within the subfamily Synanceiinae within the family Scorpaenidae, the scorpionfishes and their relatives. This species found in the Indo-Pacific and is venomous to humans.

== Taxonomy ==
Minous monodactylus was first formally described as Scorpaena monodactyla in 1801 by the German naturalists Marcus Elieser Bloch and Johann Gottlob Theaenus Schneider, the type locality was not given. In 1876 Pieter Bleeker designated Scorpaena monodactyla as the type species of the genus Minous which had originally been described in 1829 by Georges Cuvier. Cuvier named a species called Minous woora in 1829, based on "woorah minoo", the name reported by Patrick Russell to be used in Vizagapatam on the Coromandel Coast in India for what turned out to be S. monodactyla. The specific name monodactylus means "one finger", alluding to the detached lowest pectoral fin ray.

== Description ==
Minous monodactylus has between 9 and 11 spines and 10 and 12 soft rays in the dorsal fin. The anal fin has 2 spines and between 7 and 10 soft rays. It reaches a maximum total length of 15 cm (5.9 in). the pectoral fins have 12 rays with the lowest ray being clearly detached from the rest, is slightly larger and has fleshy "cap". The pelvic fin has a single spine and 5 soft rays. All fin rays are simple, i.e. unbranched. There are no scales on the head and body except for those that make up the lateral line. There are teeth in the jaws and there are vomerine teeth but no teeth on the palatine. There are dermal cirrhi on the upper eyeball and lower jaw but the rest of the skin is smooth. This species is variable in colour with the upper body being marked with pale bars and stripes and the lower body being pale. The margin of the dorsal fin is dark and there is a black spot on the front part of the soft rayed portion of the dorsal fin, typically with barring to its rear. The inner parts of the pectoral fin and its axil are pale without markings while the outer part one the anal and pelvic fins are dark. The caudal fin is crossed by two wide, vertical bars.

== Distribution and habitat ==
Minous monodactylus is found in the Indian and Pacific Oceans. It occurs along the eastern coast of Africa from Somalia south to South Africa and Madagascar but is absent from the Red Sea and Gulf of Aden. It is found from the Persian Gulf east into the Pacific where it is found in Indonesia north to southern Japan. It is absent from Australia but there is a disjunct population in New Caledonia. It is found at depths between 10 and 55 m (33 and 180 ft) in nearshore waters of the continental shelf, including sheltered waters such as bays and lagoons, where it prefers soft substrates.

== Biology ==
Minous monodactylus has a venom gland at the base of their fin spines with an anterolateral glandular groove in the spine which takes the venom to the tip.
