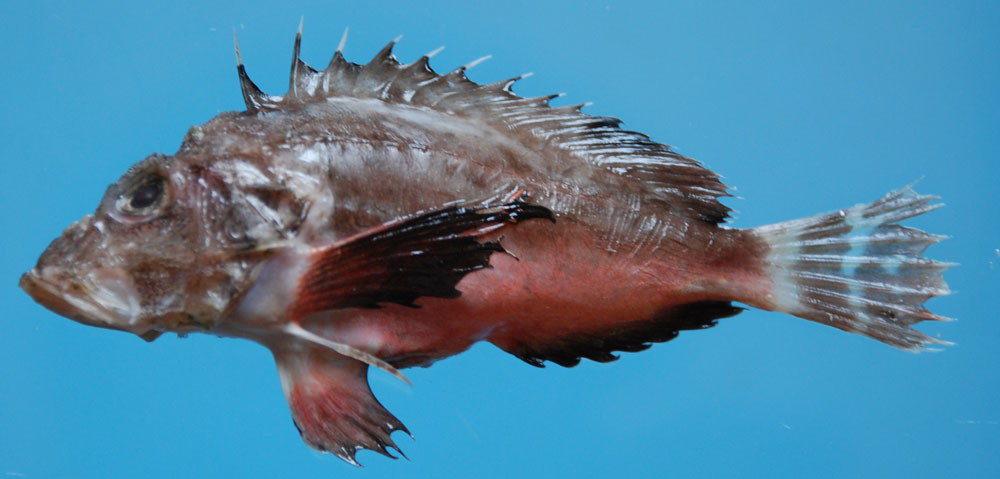
- Grey stingfish (M. monodactylus)

Scientific classification
- Kingdom: Animalia
- Phylum: Chordata
- Class: Actinopterygii
- Order: Perciformes
- Family: Synanceiidae
- Subfamily: Choridactylinae
- Tribe: Minoini; Jordan & Starks, 1904
- Genus: Minous; G. Cuvier, 1829

Type species
- Scorpaena monodactyla Bloch & Schneider, 1801

Synonyms
- Corythobatus Cantor, 1849; Decterias Jordan & Starks, 1904; Lysodermus Smith & Pope, 1906; Paraminous Fowler, 1943

= Minous =

Genus of fishes

Minous, is a genus of marine ray-finned fishes, it is the only genus in the tribe Minoini, one of the three tribes which are classified within the subfamily Synanceiinae within the family Scorpaenidae, the scorpionfishes and their relatives. They are commonly known as stingfishes. They are found in the Indo-West Pacific.

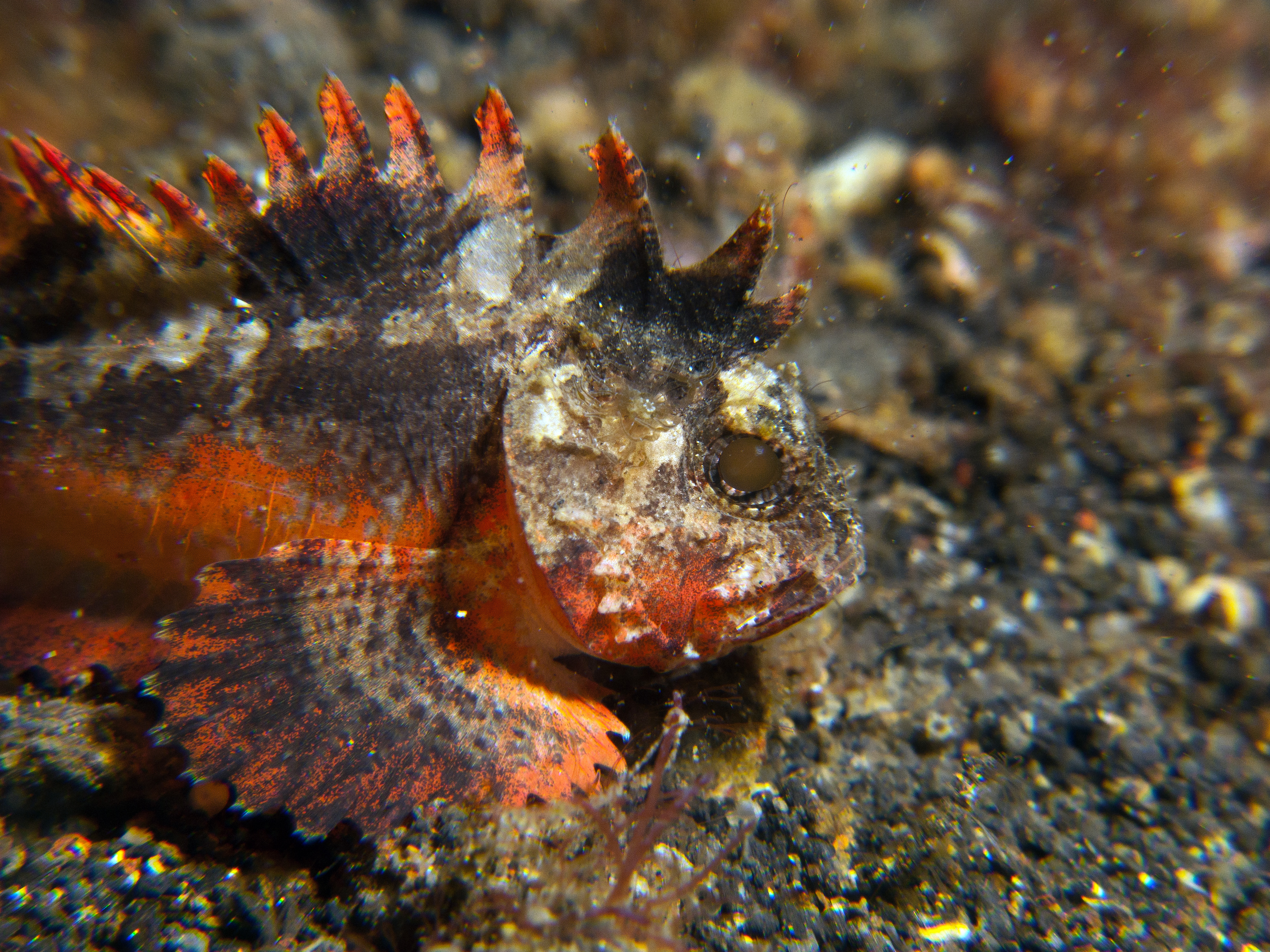
Painted stinger (Minous pictus)

== Taxonomy ==
Minous was first described as a genus by the French zoologist Georges Cuvier, in 1876 Pieter Bleeker designated Minous monodactylus, which had originally been described as Scorpaena monodactyla by Bloch and Schneider in 1801, as its type species. It is the only genus in the tribe Minoini within the subfamily Synanceiinae of the family Scorpaenidae. However, some authorities classify this taxon as a subfamily, Minoinae, Others include it within the subfamily Choridactylinae, within the family Synanceiidae.

The genus name, Minous, is a latinisation of woorah minooh, the name that in 1803 the herpetologist Patrick Russell reported was used for the type species in Vizagapatam on the Coromandel Coast in India.

== Species ==
There are currently 15 recognized species in this genus:

- Minous andriashevi Mandritsa, 1990
- Minous coccineus Alcock, 1890 (Onestick stingfish)
- Minous dempsterae Eschmeyer, Hallacher & Rama Rao, 1979 (Oblique-banded stingfish)
- Minous groeneveldi Matsunuma & Motomura, 2018 (Groeneveld’s stingfish)
- Minous inermis Alcock, 1889 (Alcock's scorpionfish)
- Minous longimanus Regan, 1908
- Minous monodactylus (Bloch & J. G. Schneider, 1801) (Grey stingfish)
- Minous pictus Günther, 1880 (Painted stinger)
- Minous pusillus Temminck & Schlegel, 1843 (Dwarf stingfish)
- Minous quincarinatus (Fowler, 1943)
- Minous radiatus Matsunuma & Motomura, 2018
- Minous roseus Matsunuma & Motomura, 2018
- Minous trachycephalus (Bleeker, 1855) (Striped stingfish)
- Minous usachevi Mandritsa, 1993
- Minous versicolor J. D. Ogilby, 1910 (Plum-striped stingfish)

== Characteristics ==
Minous stingishes are small, most are less than 15 cm (5.9 in) in total length with mainly scaleless bodies. the lowest ray of the pectoral fin is detached from the fin and is tipped with a cap. The dorsal fins have between 8 and 12 spines and 10 and 14 soft rays, although there is one species with only 4 spines and 18 soft rays. The anal fin has 2 spine and between 7 and 11 soft rays. Their pelvic fin has a single spine and 5 soft rays and the pectoral fin has 12 soft rays. The soft fin rays are unbranched. They may or may not have a swim bladder.

== Distribution and habitat ==
Minous stingfishes are found in the Indo-Pacific region from the Red Sea east into the Western pacific, north to Japan and south to Australia. These fishes are found on mud and sand bottoms where they use the detached lower pectoral fin rays to walk over the substrate.

== Biology ==
Minous stingfishes have a venom gland at the base of their fin spines with an anterolateral glandular groove in the spine which takes the venom to the tip. Some species are known to have commensal relationships with hydroids in the order Anthoathecata, there are records of commensalism between various species of Minous and the hydroids of Hydractinia minoi.
