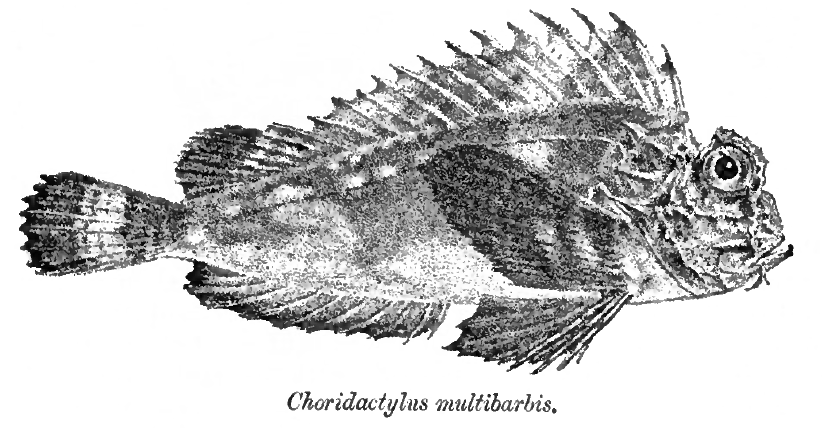
- Orangebanded stingfish (C. multibarbus)

Scientific classification
- Kingdom: Animalia
- Phylum: Chordata
- Class: Actinopterygii
- Order: Perciformes
- Family: Synanceiidae
- Subfamily: Choridactylinae; Kaup, 1859

Genera
- see text

Synonyms
- Choridactylinae Kaup, 1859; Pelorinae Gill, 1893; Inimicinae Gill, 1905

= Choridactylinae =

Tribe of fishes

Choridactylinae, commonly known as stingfishes, stingers or ghouls, is a subfamily of venomous ray-finned fishes classified within the family Synanceiidae, the stonefishes, part of the suborder Scorpaenoidei, the scorpionfishes and their relatives. These fishes are found in the Indo-Pacific.

== Taxonomy ==
Choridactylinae was first recognised as a taxonomic grouping in 1859 by the German zoologist Johann Jakob Kaup. The 5th edition of the Fishes of the World treats this taxon as a tribe within the subfamily Synanceiinae which it, in turn, treats as being classified in the family Scorpaneanidae. More recently, authorities such as Eschmeyer's Catalog of Fishes treat it as a subfamily, Choridactylinae, of the family Synanceiidae.

The name of this taxon is based on that of the genus Choridactylus, described by John Richardson in 1848, which is made up of choris, meaning "separated", and dactylus, which means "finger", and allusion to the detached pectoral fin rays of Choridactylus multibarbus, a feature which "readily distinguished" it from other stonefishes known to Richardson.

== Genera ==
Choridactylini has 3 genera classified within it:

- Choridactylus Richardson, 1848
- Inimicus Jordan & Starks, 1904
- Minous Cuvier, 1829

== Characteristics ==
Choridactylini stingfishes are characterised by having bodies and heads which are almost completely naked having almost no scales other than the 13 to 15 widely spaced and embedded scales which make up the lateral line and the clumps of other buried scales, which manifest as warts or tufts scattered on the upper body. They have 12 to 18 spines and 5 to10 soft rays in their dorsal fin while the anal fin has 2 spines and 8 to 13 soft rays. There are 12 fin rays in the pectoral fins with the lower rays separated (2 separate rays in Inimicus or 3 in Choridactylus). The pelvic fin has a single spine and 5 soft rays. The majority of the fin rays are branched. These fishes vary in size from a total length of 14 cm (5.5 in) to 29 cm (11 in).

== Distribution and habitat ==
Choridactylini are found in the Indian and Western Pacific Oceans in shallow coastal waters over sandy substrates.
