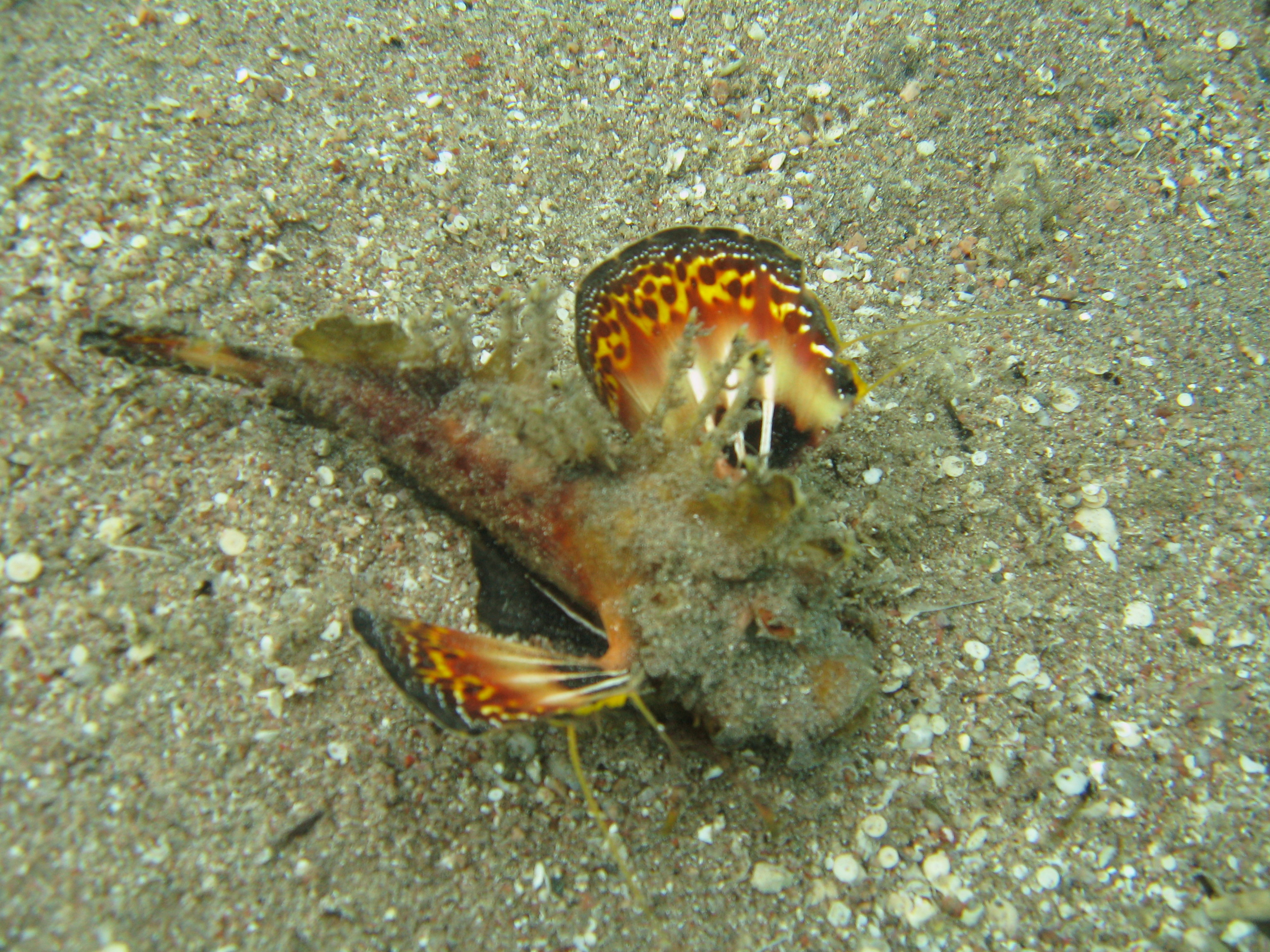

Conservation status
- Least Concern (IUCN 3.1)

Scientific classification
- Kingdom: Animalia
- Phylum: Chordata
- Class: Actinopterygii
- Order: Perciformes
- Family: Synanceiidae
- Genus: Inimicus
- Species: I. filamentosus

Binomial name
- Inimicus filamentosus (G. Cuvier, 1829)

Synonyms
- Inimicus dactylus Cornic, 1987; Pelor filamentosum Cuvier, 1829

= Inimicus filamentosus =

Species of fish

Inimicus filamentosus, also known as the filament-finned stinger, barred ghoul, two-stick stingfish, or devil scorpionfish, is a member of the Inimicus genus of venomous fishes. It is a member of the Synanceiidae (devilfishes, goblinfishes, and stonefishes) family of the Scorpaeniformes order of ray-finned fishes. These benthic fishes are found on sandy or silty substrates of lagoon and seaward reefs, in coastal regions of tropical oceans. Like all the other known species of Inimicus, I. filamentosus is a demersal ambush predator. They are nocturnal, and often dig themselves partially into the sandy seabed during the day.

== Distribution ==
Western Indian Ocean: Red Sea and East Africa to Maldives.

== Description ==
Adults are typically 13-25 centimeters in length, and can weigh up to 480 grams. The body color can be a dull yellow, gray, brown, or rust in color with light blotches, and very similar to that of the surrounding sandy or coral seabed in which they are found. This coloration acts as a camouflage which renders them extremely difficult to detect in their natural habitat. The skin is without scales except along the lateral line, and is covered with venomous spines and wartlike glands which give it a knobby appearance. The head is flattened, depressed and concave. The eyes, mouth and nostrils project upwards and outwards from the dorsal aspect of the head. Sexual dimorphism is not believed to occur in this species.

Fin morphology:

- dorsal fin: composed of 15 to 17 spines and 7 to 9 soft rays.
- caudal fin: composed of 2-4 spines and 4-14 soft rays, with dark bands at basal and subterminal positions.
- pelvic fin: composed of one spine and 3-5 soft rays.
- pectoral fin: composed of 10-12 rays. The two most caudal rays of each pectoral fin are detached from the rest of the fin, and angled in a ventral direction. The fish employ these two rays to prop up the forward part of their body, as well as to "walk" along the bottom of the substrate. The ventral surface of the pectoral fins bears broad black bands containing smaller, lighter spots at the basal and distal ends. In I. filamentosus, these bands are attenuated, while the bands of I. sinensis have yellow spots on them. This is a key feature for distinguishing the two species, which are otherwise nearly identical.

== Behavior ==
I. filamentosus is a piscivorous ambush predator. It is nocturnal and typically lies partially buried on the sea floor or on a coral head during the day, covering itself with sand and other debris to further camouflage itself. It has no known natural predators. When disturbed by a scuba diver or a potential predator, it fans out its brilliantly colored pectoral and caudal fins as a warning. Once dug in, it is very reluctant to leave its hiding place. When it does move, it displays an unusual mechanism of subcarangiform locomotion — it crawls slowly along the seabed, employing the four lower rays (two on each side) of its pectoral fins as legs.
