= Ambush predator =

Predator that hunts by surprise, as opposed to those that chase

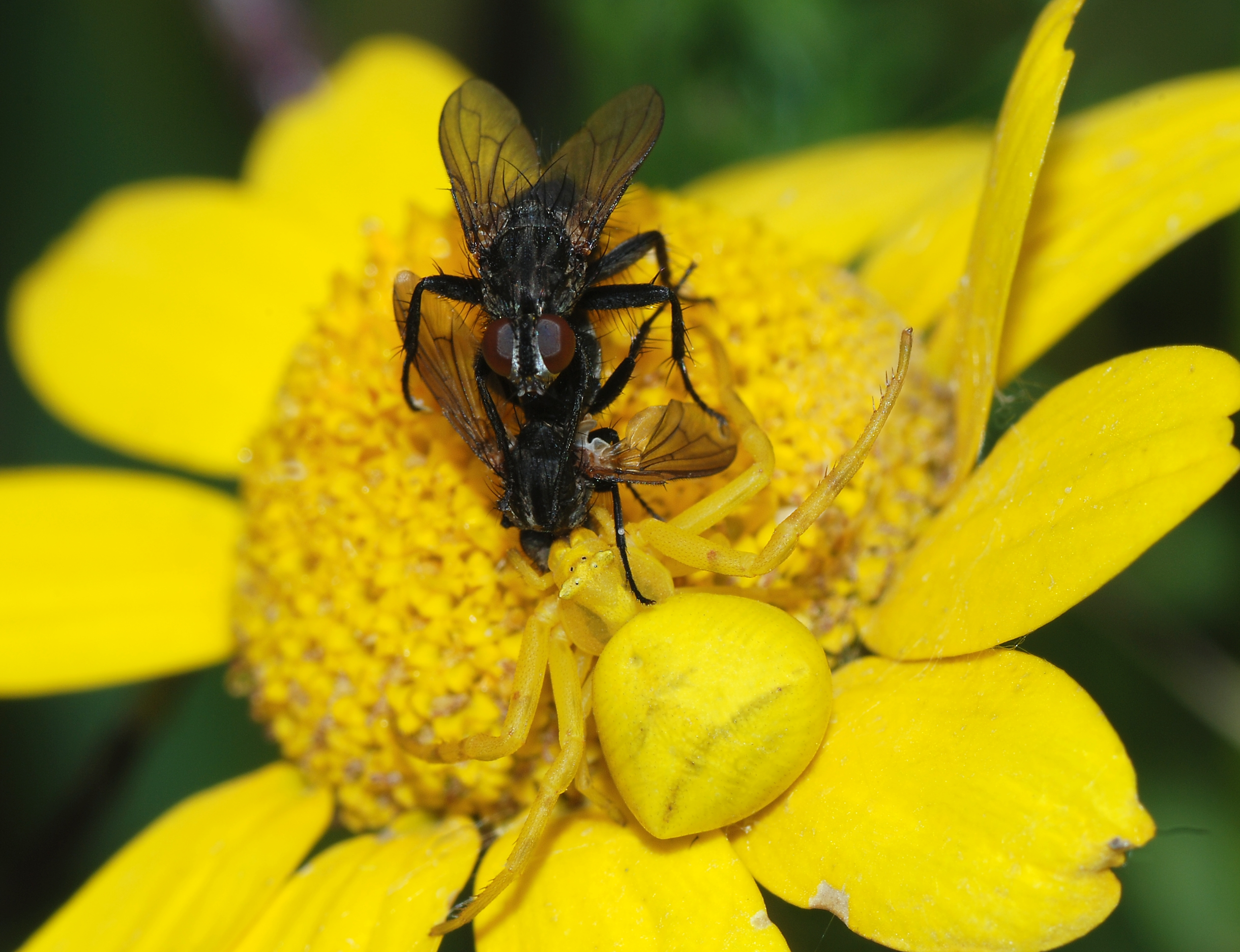
A camouflaged female goldenrod crab spider (Misumena vatia) ambushing the female of a pair of mating flies

Ambush predators, or sit-and-wait predators, are carnivorous animals that capture their prey via stealth, luring or (typically instinctive) strategies utilizing an element of surprise. Unlike pursuit predators, who chase to capture prey using sheer speed or endurance, ambush predators avoid fatigue by staying in concealment, waiting patiently for the prey to get near, before launching a sudden overwhelming attack that quickly incapacitates and captures the prey.

The ambush is often opportunistic, and may be set by hiding in a burrow, by camouflage, by aggressive mimicry, or by the use of a trap (e.g. a web). The predator then uses a combination of senses to detect and assess the prey, and to time the strike. Nocturnal ambush predators such as cats and snakes have vertical slit pupils helping them to judge the distance to prey in dim light. Different ambush predators use a variety of means to capture their prey, from the long sticky tongues of chameleons to the expanding mouths of frogfishes.

Ambush predation is widely distributed in the animal kingdom, spanning some members of numerous groups such as the starfish, cephalopods, crustaceans, spiders, insects such as mantises, and vertebrates such as many types of snake, fish, and cats.

== Strategy ==
In the foraging cycle, ambush predators choose variants of the sit-and-wait strategy in place of active pursuit to capture their prey.

Ambush predators usually remain motionless (sometimes hidden) and wait for prey to come within ambush distance before pouncing. Ambush predators are often camouflaged, and may be solitary. Pursuit predation becomes a better strategy than ambush predation when the predator is faster than the prey. Ambush predators use many intermediate strategies. For example, when a pursuit predator is faster than its prey over a short distance, but not in a long chase, then either stalking or ambush becomes necessary as part of the strategy.

== Bringing the prey within range ==
=== Concealment ===
Ambush often relies on concealment, whether by staying out of sight or by means of camouflage.

==== Burrows ====
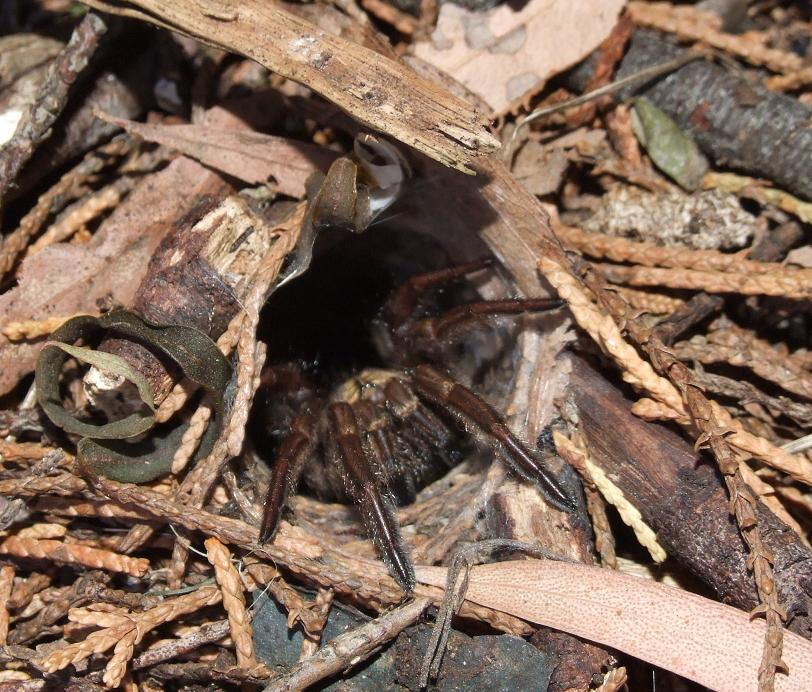
Trapdoor spider Misgolas rapax in its burrow

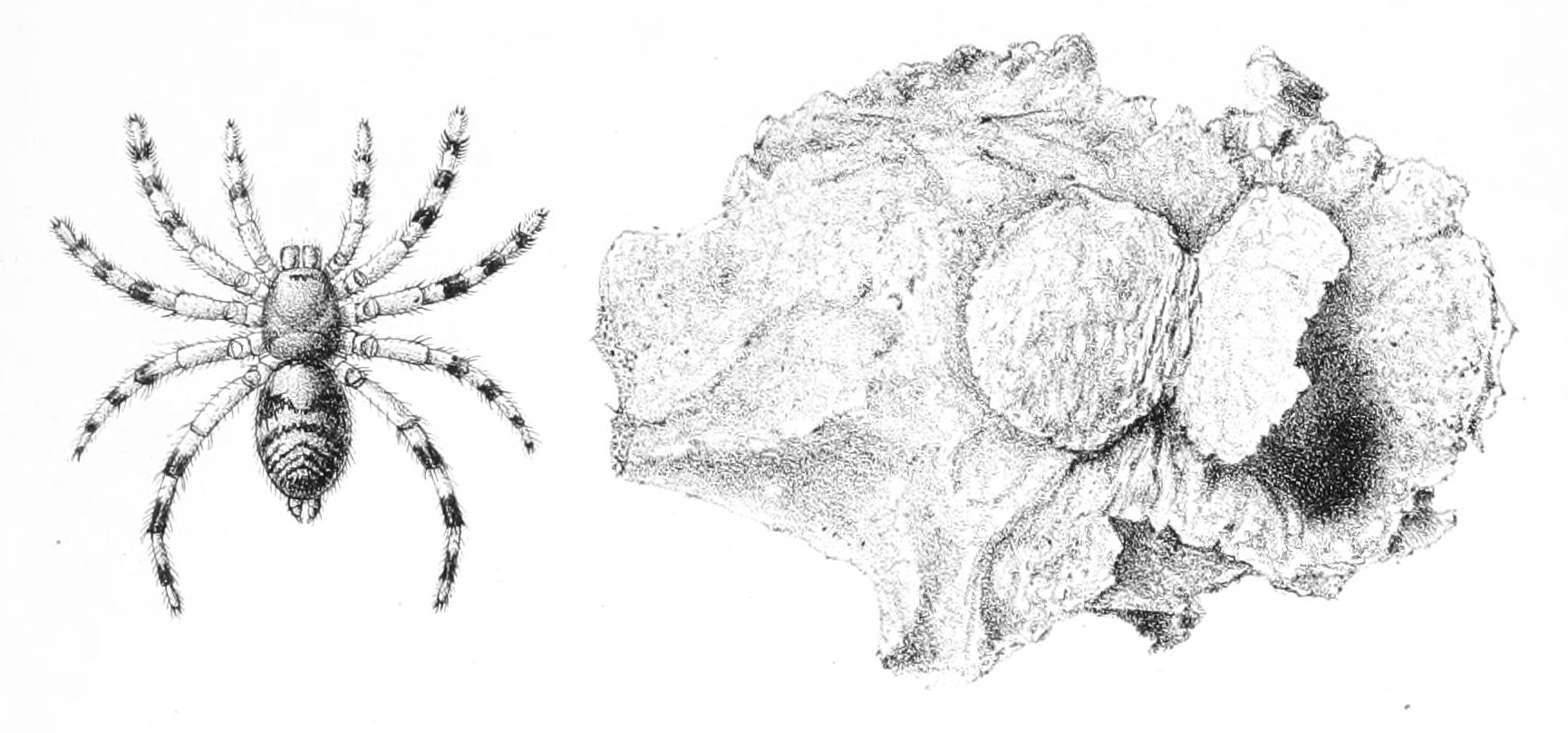
The trapdoor spider Sason robustum and its nest

Ambush predators such as trapdoor spiders and Australian crab spiders on land and mantis shrimps in the sea rely on concealment, constructing and hiding in burrows. These provide effective concealment at the price of a restricted field of vision.

Trapdoor spiders excavate a burrow and seal the entrance with a web trapdoor hinged on one side with silk. The best-known is the thick, bevelled "cork" type, which neatly fits the burrow's opening. The other is the "wafer" type; it is a basic sheet of silk and earth. The door's upper side is often effectively camouflaged with local materials such as pebbles and sticks. The spider spins silk fishing lines, or trip wires, that radiate out of the burrow entrance. When the spider is using the trap to capture prey, its chelicerae (protruding mouthparts) hold the door shut on the end furthest from the hinge. Prey make the silk vibrate, and alert the spider to open the door and ambush the prey.

==== Camouflage ====
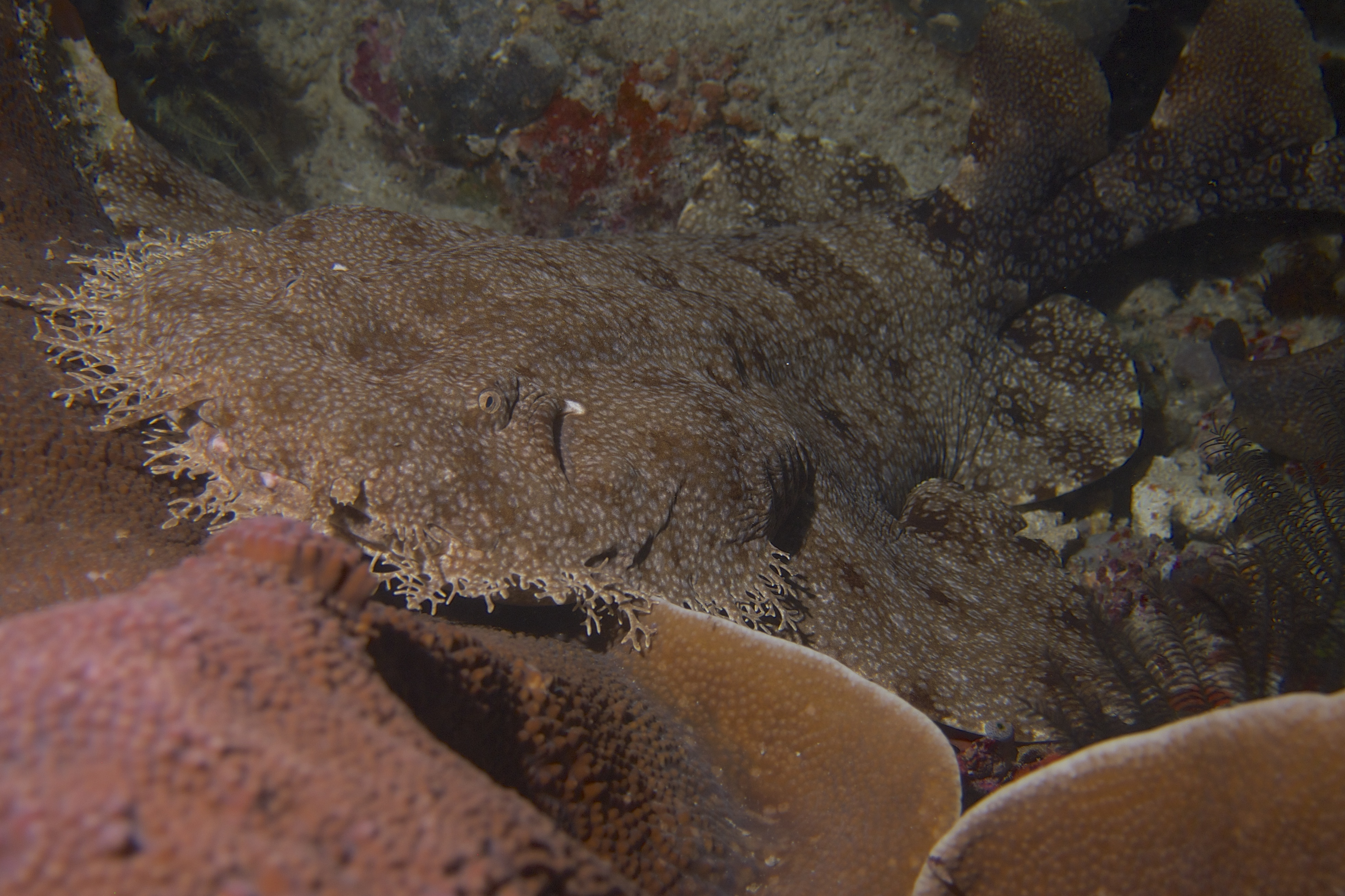
Tasselled wobbegong relies on its disruptive camouflage to ambush fish and invertebrates.

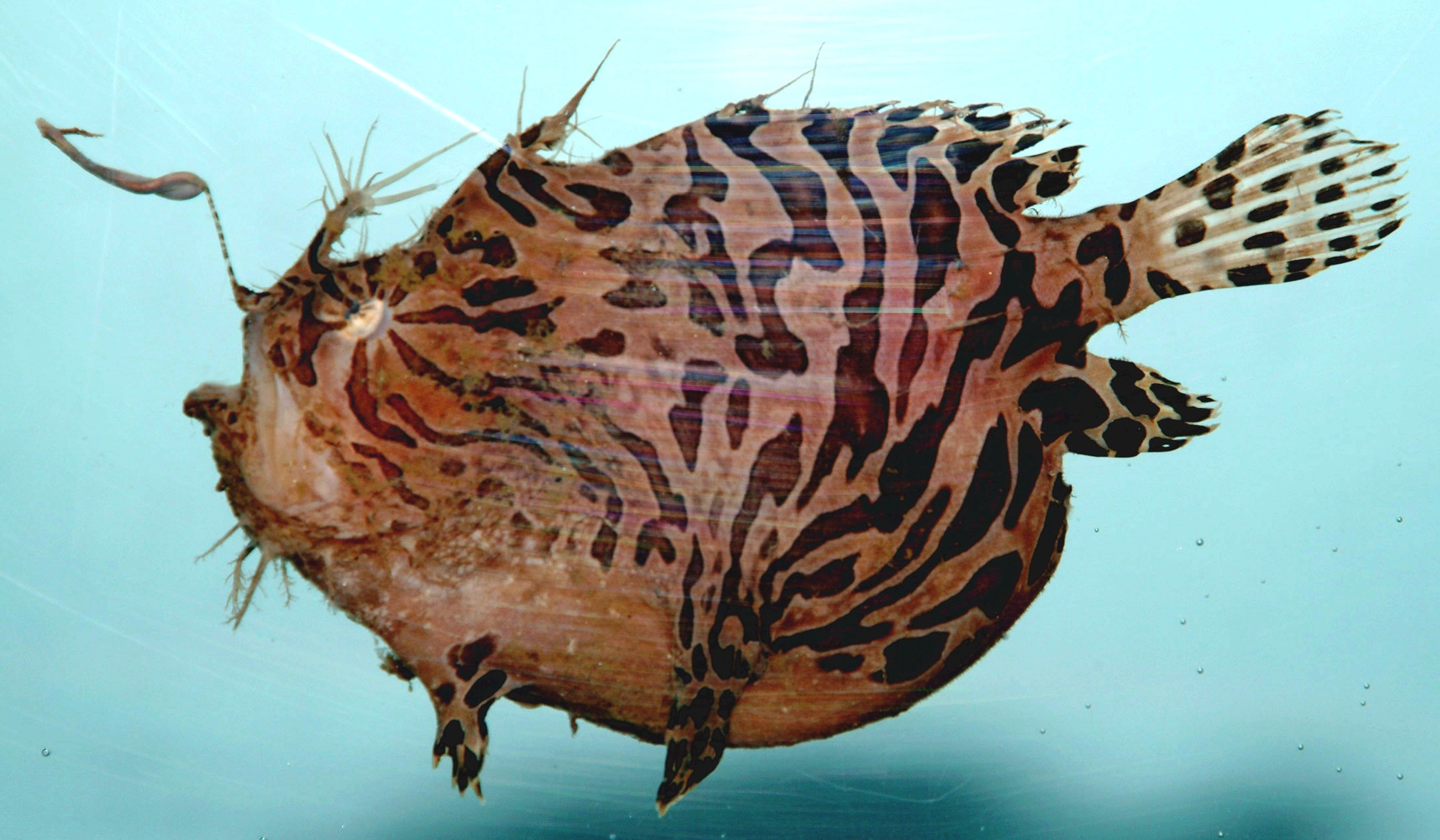
Striated frogfish uses camouflage and aggressive mimicry in the form of a fishing rod-like esca (lure) on its head to attract prey.

Many ambush predators make use of camouflage so that their prey can come within striking range without detecting their presence. Among insects, coloration in ambush bugs closely matches the flower heads where they wait for prey. Among fishes, the warteye stargazer buries itself nearly completely in the sand and waits for prey. The devil scorpionfish typically lies partially buried on the sea floor or on a coral head during the day, covering itself with sand and other debris to further camouflage itself. The tasselled wobbegong is a shark whose adaptations as an ambush predator include a strongly flattened and camouflaged body with a fringe that breaks up its outline. Among amphibians, the Pipa pipa's brown coloration blends in with the murky waters of the Amazon Rainforest which allows for this species to lie in wait and ambush its prey.

=== Aggressive mimicry ===
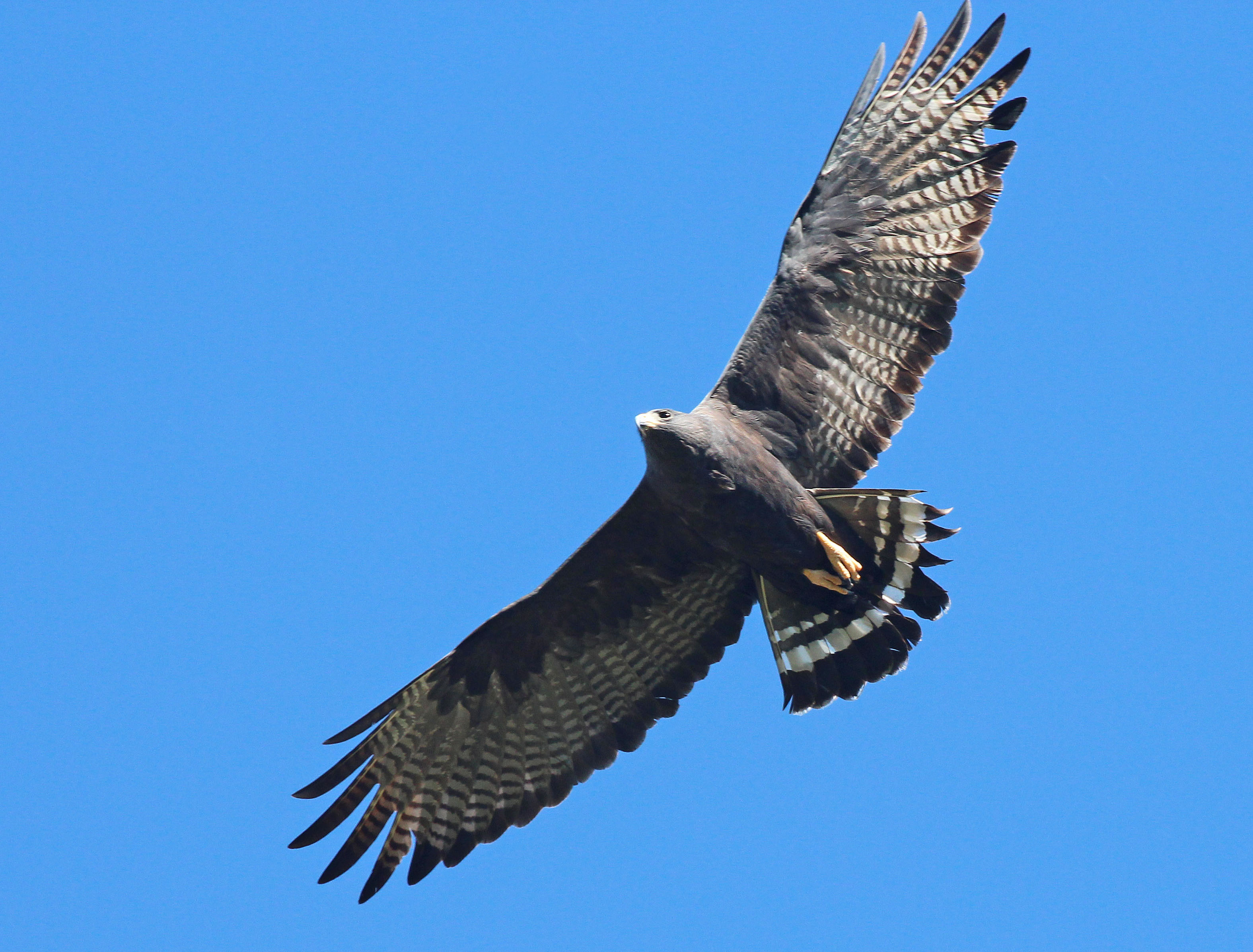
Claimed mimic: zone-tailed hawk

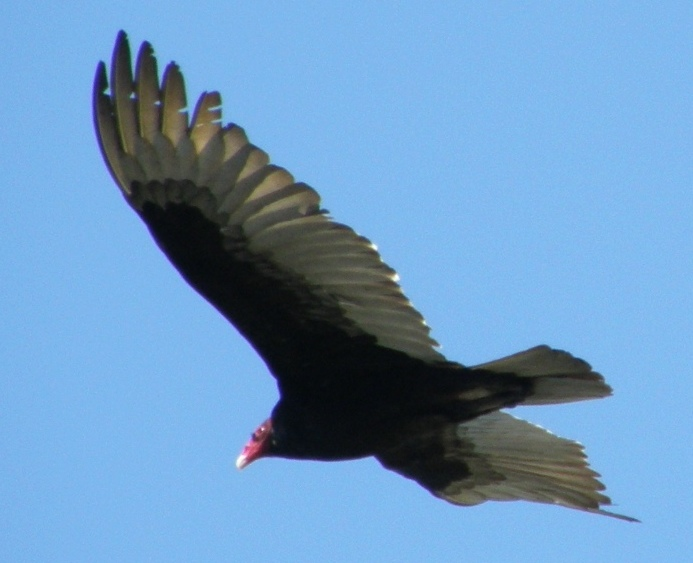
Model: Turkey vulture

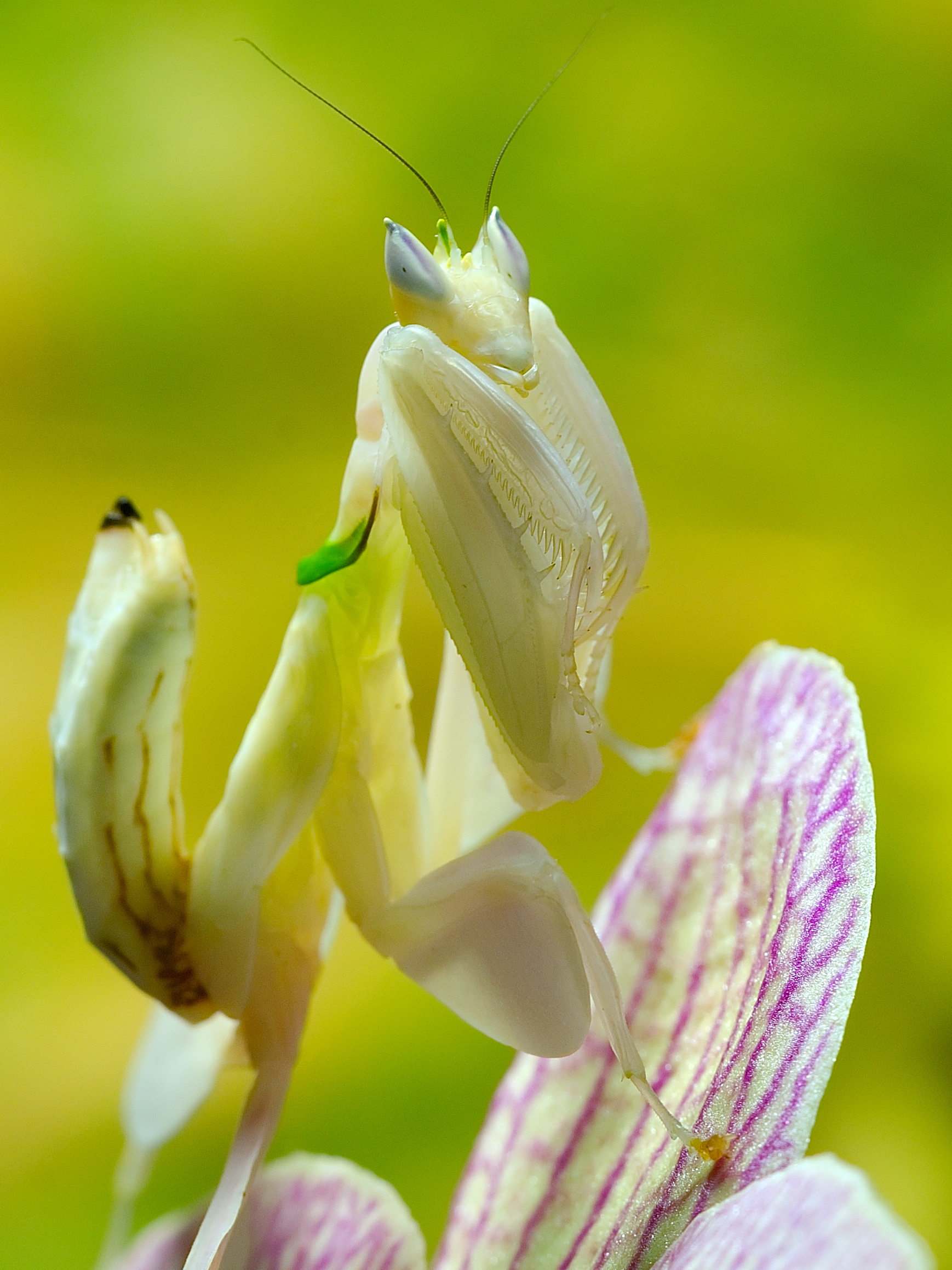
The orchid mantis, Hymenopus coronatus, mimics a rainforest orchid of southeast Asia to lure its prey, pollinator insects.

Many ambush predators actively attract their prey towards them before ambushing them. This strategy is called aggressive mimicry, using the false promise of nourishment to lure prey. The alligator snapping turtle is a well-camouflaged ambush predator. Its tongue bears a conspicuous pink extension that resembles a worm and can be wriggled around; fish that try to eat the "worm" are themselves eaten by the turtle. Similarly, some reptiles such as Elaphe rat snakes employ caudal luring (tail luring) to entice small vertebrates into striking range.

The zone-tailed hawk, which resembles the turkey vulture, flies among flocks of turkey vultures. There is however some controversy about whether this is a true case of wolf in sheep's clothing mimicry.

Flower mantises are aggressive mimics, resembling flowers convincingly enough to attract prey that come to collect pollen and nectar. The orchid mantis actually attracts its prey, pollinator insects, more effectively than flowers do. Crab spiders, similarly, are coloured like the flowers they habitually rest on, but again, they can lure their prey even away from flowers.

=== Traps ===
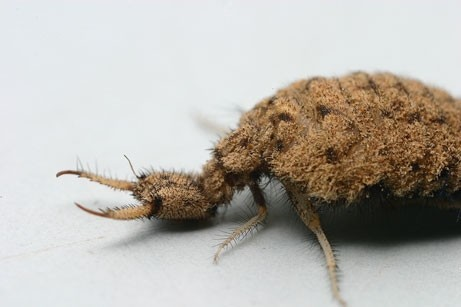
Antlion larva with grasping mandibles

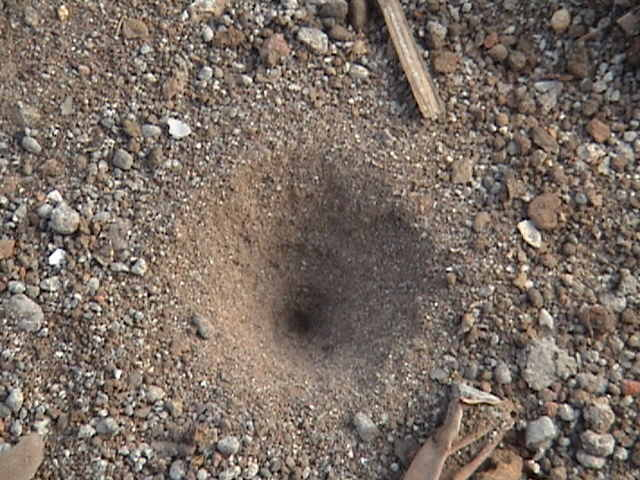
Antlion's sandpit trap

Some ambush predators build traps to help capture their prey. Lacewings are a flying insect in the order Neuroptera. In some species, their larval form, known as the antlion, is an ambush predator. Eggs are laid in the earth, often in caves or under a rocky ledge. The juvenile creates a small, crater shaped trap. The antlion hides under a light cover of sand or earth. When an ant, beetle or other prey slides into the trap, the antlion grabs the prey with its powerful jaws.

Some but not all web-spinning spiders are sit-and-wait ambush predators. The sheetweb spiders (Linyphiidae) tend to stay with their webs for long periods and so resemble sit-and-wait predators, whereas the orb-weaving spiders (such as the Araneidae) tend to move frequently from one patch to another (and thus resemble active foragers).

== Detection and assessment ==
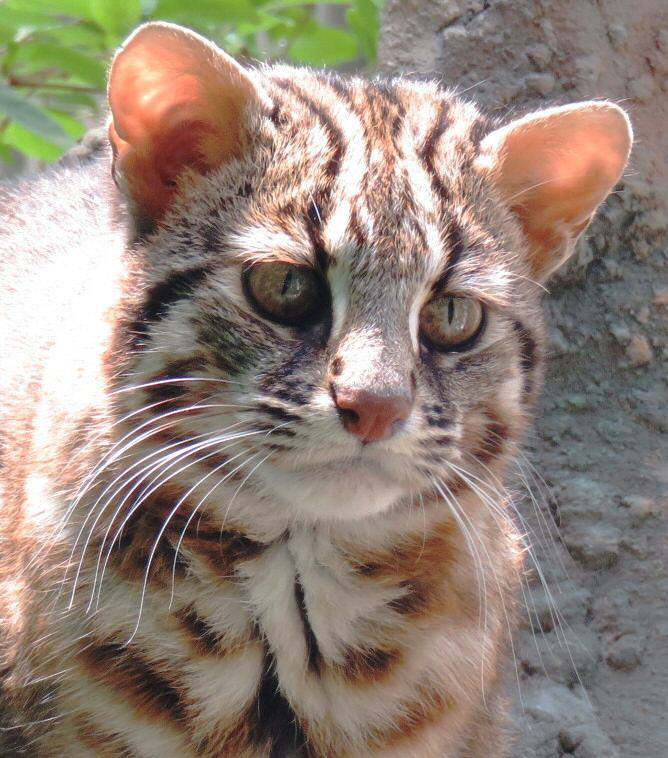
Many nocturnal ambush predators like this leopard cat have vertical pupils, enabling them to judge distance to prey accurately in dim light.

Ambush predators must time their strike carefully. They need to detect the prey, assess it as worth attacking, and strike when it is in exactly the right place. They have evolved a variety of adaptations that facilitate this assessment. For example, pit vipers prey on small birds, choosing targets of the right size for their mouth gape: larger snakes choose larger prey. They prefer to strike prey that is both warm and moving; their pit organs between the eye and the nostril contain infrared (heat) receptors, enabling them to find and perhaps judge the size of their small, warm-blooded prey.

The deep-sea tripodfish Bathypterois grallator uses tactile and mechanosensory cues to identify food in its low-light environment. The fish faces into the current, waiting for prey to drift by.

Several species of Felidae (cats) and snakes have vertically elongated (slit) pupils, advantageous for nocturnal ambush predators as it helps them to estimate the distance to prey in dim light; diurnal and pursuit predators in contrast have round pupils.

== Capturing the prey ==
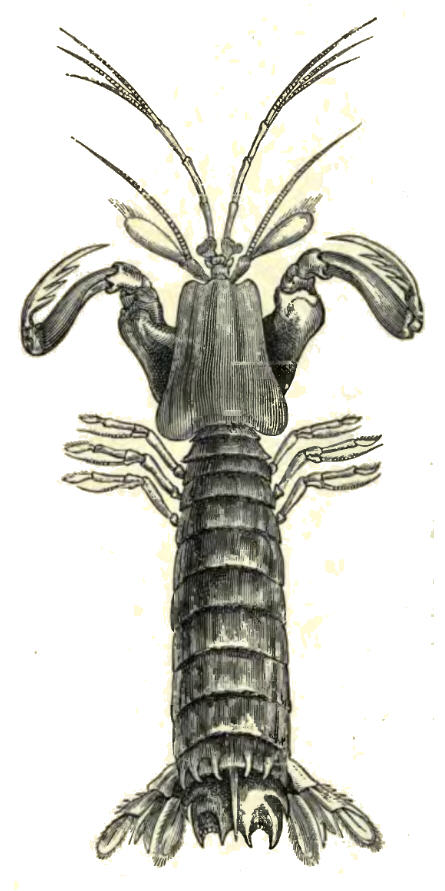
Mantis shrimp captures its prey rapidly with its mantis-like front legs.

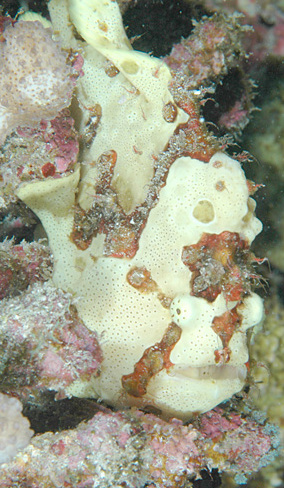
Frogfish traps its prey by suddenly opening its jaws and sucking the prey in.

Ambush predators often have adaptations for seizing their prey rapidly and securely. The capturing movement has to be rapid to trap the prey, given that the attack is not modifiable once launched. Zebra mantis shrimp capture agile prey such as fish primarily at night while hidden in burrows, striking very hard and fast, with a mean peak speed 2.30 m/s (5.1 mph) and mean duration of 24.98 ms.

A chameleon's tongue striking ballistically at food

Chameleons (family Chamaeleonidae) are highly adapted as ambush predators. They can change colour to match their surroundings and often climb through trees with a swaying motion, probably to mimic the movement of the leaves and branches they are surrounded by. All chameleons are primarily insectivores and feed by ballistically projecting their tongues, often twice the length of their bodies, to capture prey. The tongue is projected in as little as 0.07 seconds, and is launched at an acceleration of over 41 g. The power with which the tongue is launched, over 3000 W·kg^{−1}, is more than muscle can produce, indicating that energy is stored in an elastic tissue for sudden release.

All fishes face a basic problem when trying to swallow prey: opening their mouth may pull food in, but closing it will push the food out again. Frogfishes capture their prey by suddenly opening their jaws, with a mechanism which enlarges the volume of the mouth cavity up to 12-fold and pulls the prey (crustaceans, molluscs and other whole fishes) into the mouth along with water; the jaws close without reducing the volume of the mouth cavity. The attack can be as fast as 6 milliseconds.

== Taxonomic range ==
Video of a water bug nymph attacking a fish

Ambush predation is widely distributed across the animal kingdom. It is found in many vertebrates including fishes such as the frogfishes (anglerfishes) of the sea bottom, and the pikes of freshwater; reptiles including crocodiles, snapping turtles, the mulga dragon, and many snakes such as the black mamba; mammals such as the cats; and birds such as the anhinga (darter). The strategy is found in several invertebrate phyla including arthropods such as mantises, purseweb spiders, and some crustaceans; cephalopod molluscs such as the colossal squid; and starfish such as Leptasterias tenera.
