= Coral reef fish =

Fish which live amongst or in close relation to coral reefs

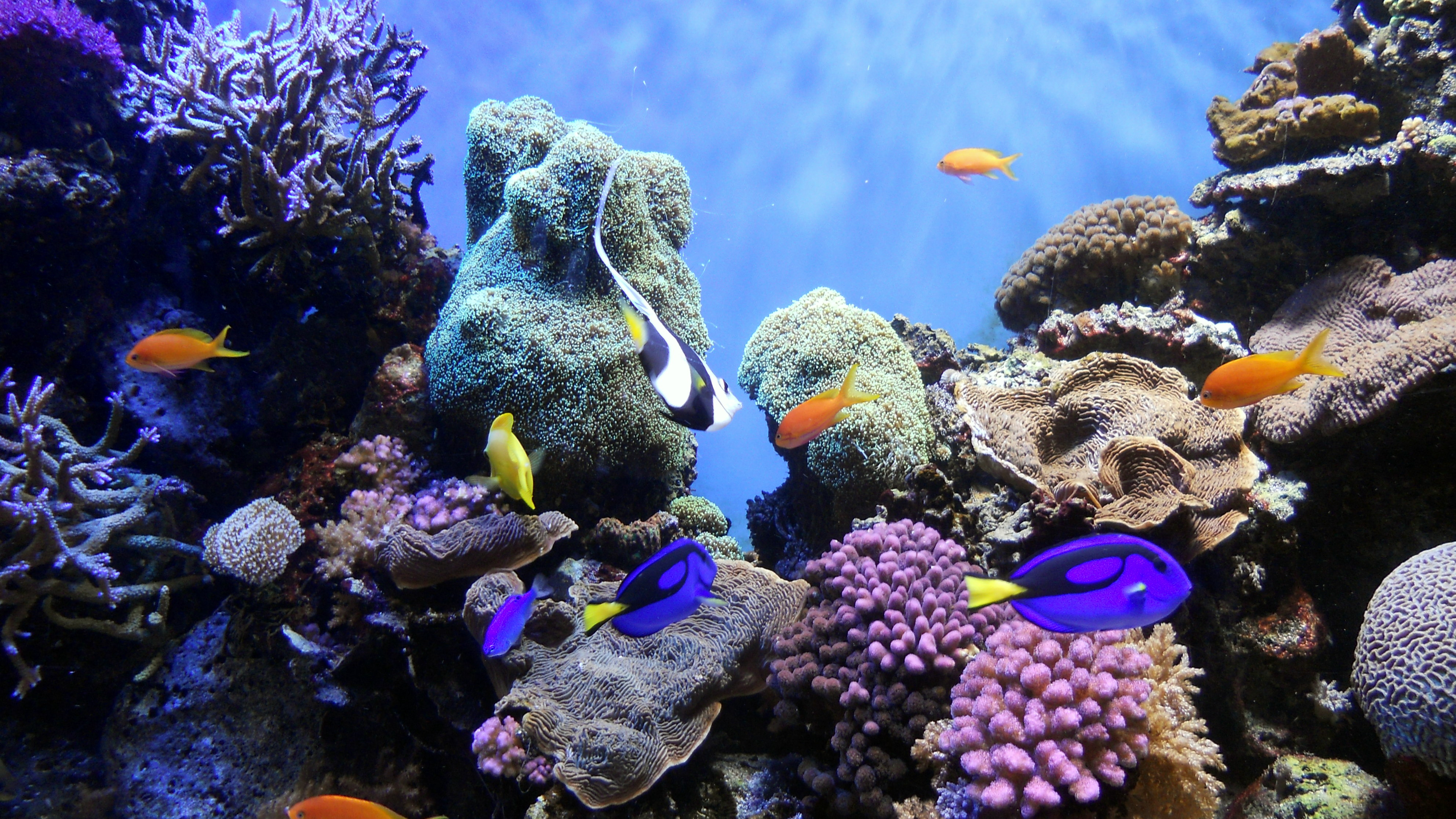
The fish that inhabit coral reefs are numerous and diverse.

Coral reef fish are marine fish which live amongst or in close relation to coral reefs. Coral reefs form complex ecosystems with a high amount of biodiversity. Among the multitude of inhabitants, the fish stand out as colourful and interesting to watch. Hundreds of species can exist in a small area of a healthy reef, many of them hidden or well camouflaged. Reef fish have developed many specialisations adapted to survival on the reefs.

Coral reefs occupy less than 1% of the surface area of the world oceans, but provide a home for 25% of all marine fish species. Reef habitats are a sharp contrast to the open water habitats that make up the other 99% of the world oceans.

However, loss and degradation of coral reef habitat, increasing pollution, and overfishing including the use of destructive fishing practices, are threatening the survival of the coral reefs and the associated reef fish.

== Overview ==
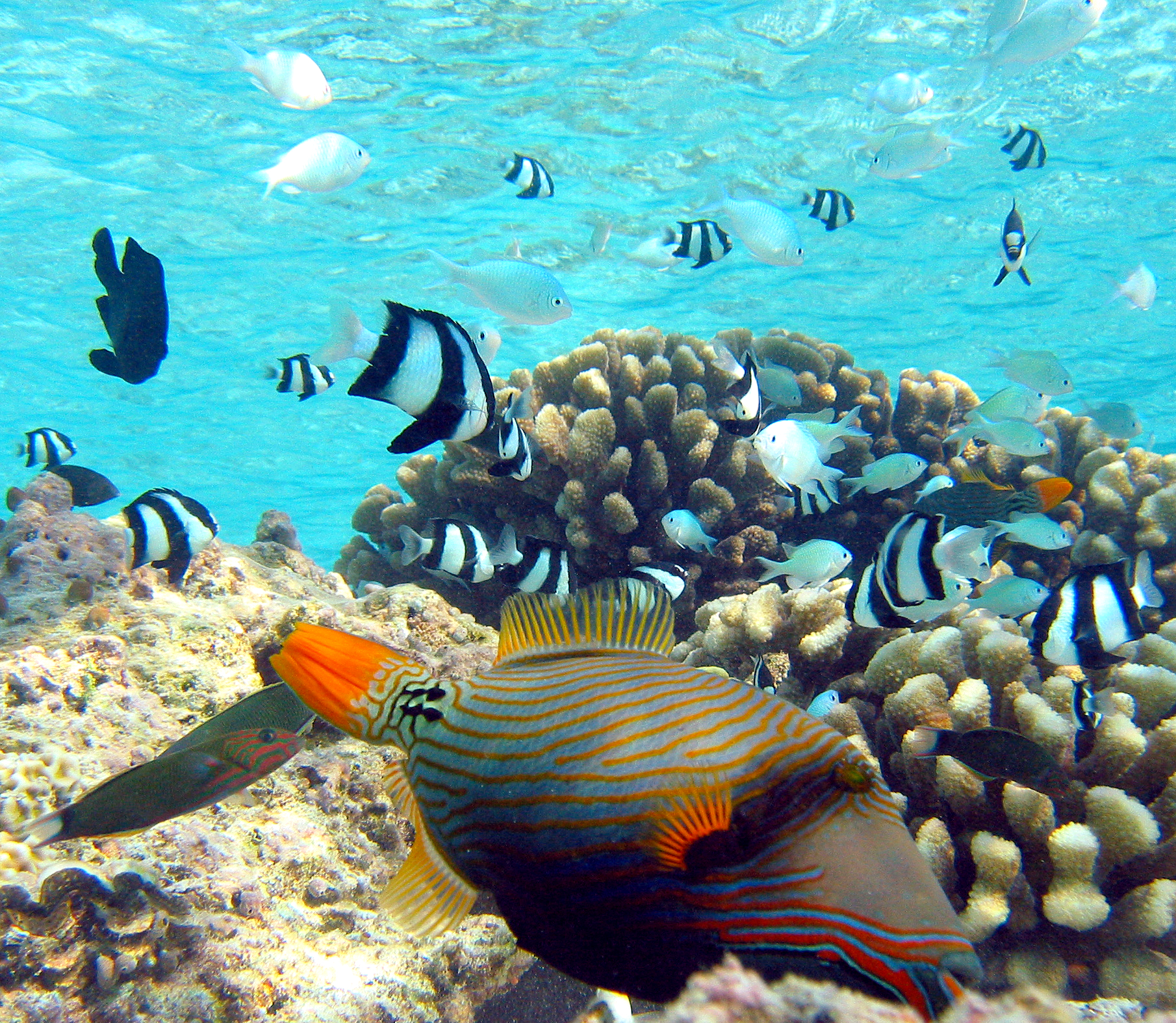
In the foreground is an orange-lined triggerfish displaying spines. Triggerfish have mouths that crush shells. Orange-lined triggerfish are particularly aggressive. The black and white fish are three-stripe damselfish and the unstriped fish are blue-green chromis damselfish. If the triggerfish attacks, the damselfish will hide in the nearby cauliflower coral. If the triggerfish wants to hide, it will squeeze into a coral crevice and lock itself in place with its spines.

Coral reefs are the result of millions of years of coevolution among algae, invertebrates and fish. They have become crowded and complex environments, and the fish have evolved many ingenious ways of surviving. Most fishes found on coral reefs are ray-finned fishes, known for the characteristic sharp, bony rays and spines in their fins. These spines provide formidable defences, and when erected they can usually be locked in place or are venomous. Many reef fish have also evolved cryptic coloration to confuse predators.

Reef fish have also evolved complex adaptive behaviours. Small reef fish get protection from predators by hiding in reef crevices or by shoaling and schooling. Many reef fish confine themselves to one small neighbourhood where every hiding place is known and can be immediately accessed. Others cruise the reefs for food in shoals, but return to a known area to hide when they are inactive. Resting small fish are still vulnerable to attack by crevice predators, so many fish, such as triggerfish, squeeze into a small hiding place and wedge themselves by erecting their spines.

As an example of the adaptations made by reef fish, surgeon fishes are herbivores which feed on benthic turf algae. They also provide cleaner services to marine turtles, by removing algal growth from their shells. They do not tolerate other fish with the same colour or shape. When alarmed, they can erect spines in their tail and slash at their opponent with rapid sideways movements.

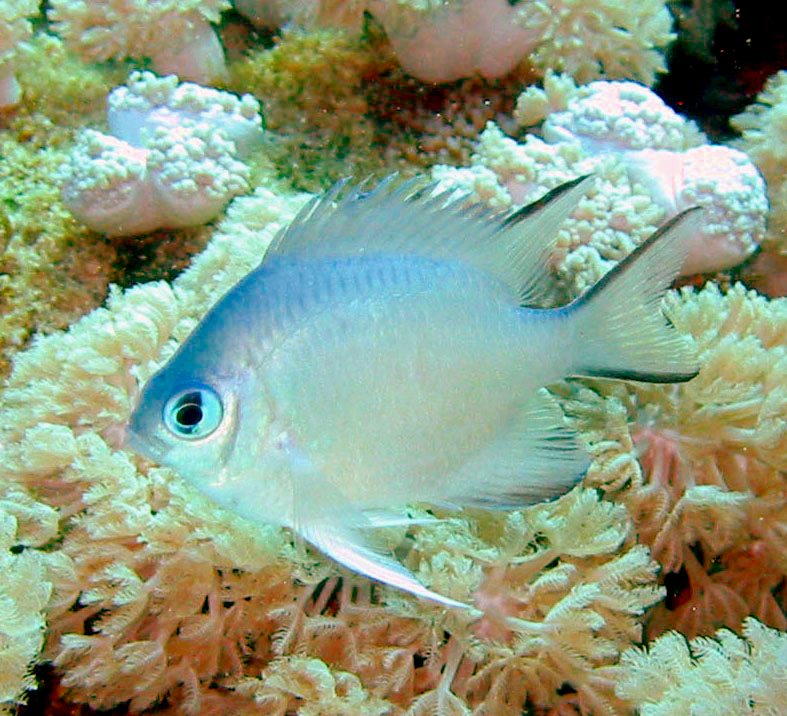
Most coral reef fish have spines in their fins like this damselfish.

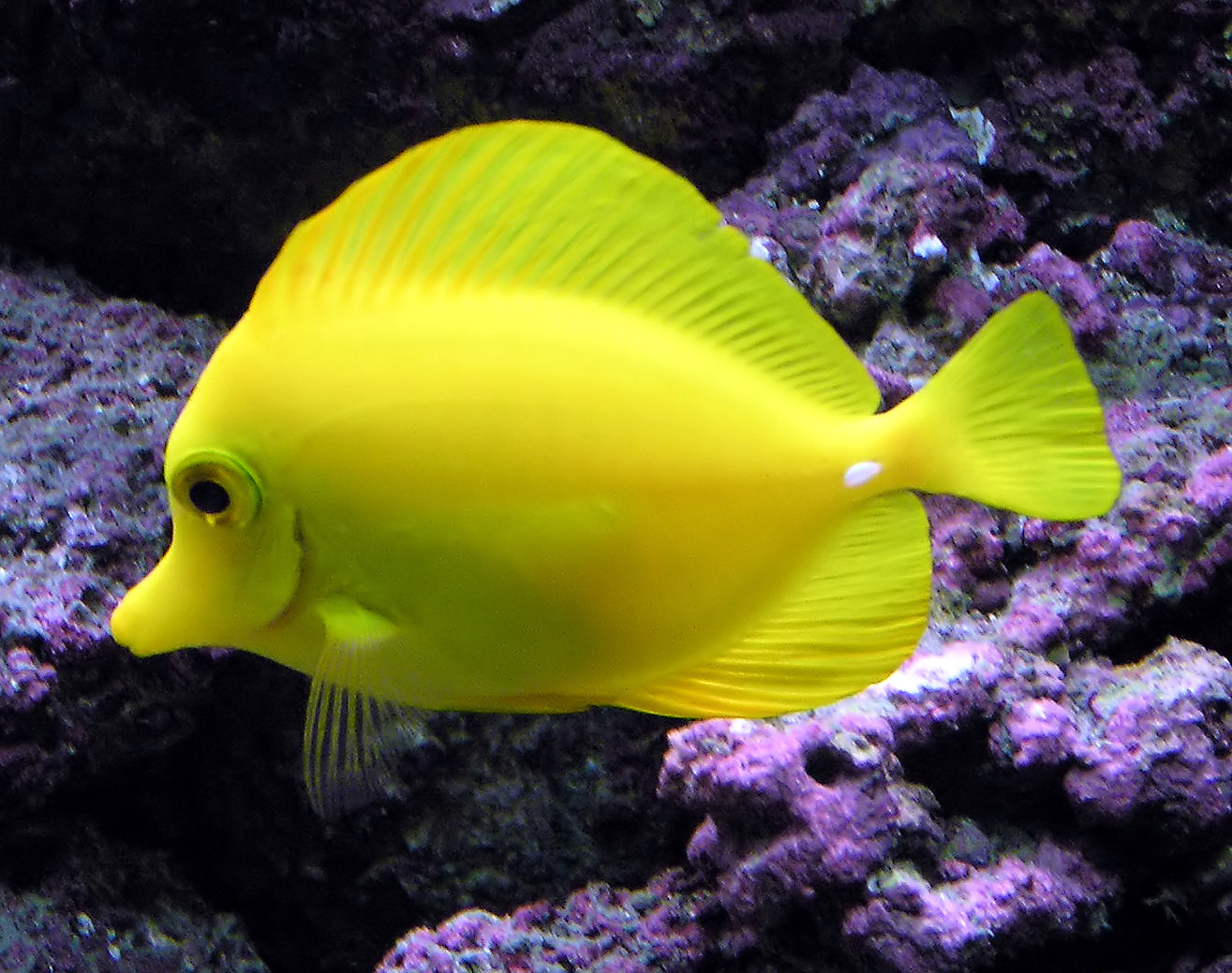
The yellow tang, a usually placid surgeon fish, can erect spines in its tail and slash at its opponent with rapid sideways movements.

== Diversity and distribution ==
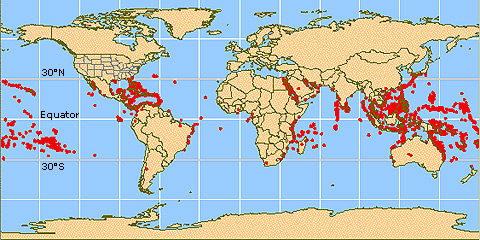
Distribution of coral reefs

Coral reefs contain the most diverse fish assemblages to be found anywhere on earth, with perhaps as many as 6,000–8,000 species dwelling within coral reef ecosystems of the world's oceans.

The mechanisms that first led to, and continue to maintain, such concentrations of fish species on coral reefs has been widely debated over the last 50 years. While many reasons have been proposed, there is no general scientific consensus on which of these is the most influential, but it seems likely that a number of factors contribute. These include the rich habitat complexity and diversity inherent in coral reef ecosystems, the wide variety and temporal availability of food resources available to coral reef fishes, a host of pre and post-larval settlement processes, and as yet unresolved interactions between all these factors. The wealth of fishes on reefs is filled by tiny, bottom-dwelling reef fishes.

There are two major regions of coral reef development recognized; the Indo-Pacific (which includes the Pacific and Indian Oceans as well as the Red Sea), and the tropical western Atlantic (also known as the "wider" or "greater" Caribbean). Each of these two regions contains its own unique coral reef fish fauna with no natural overlap in species. Of the two regions, the richest by far in terms of reef fish diversity is the Indo-Pacific where there are an estimated 4,000–5,000 species of fishes associated with coral reef habitats. Another 500–700 species can be found in the greater Caribbean region.

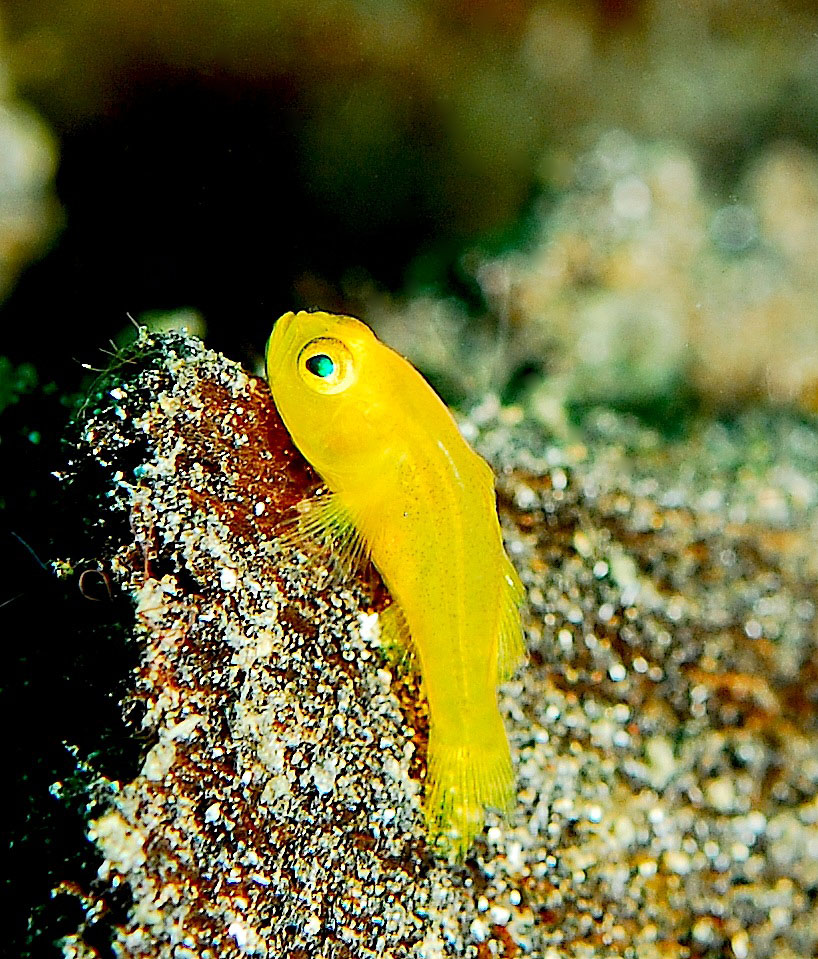
Among goby species, small coral reef-dwelling fishes, is the world's shortest lived vertebrate, the seven-figure pygmy goby, which lives for less than 60 days.

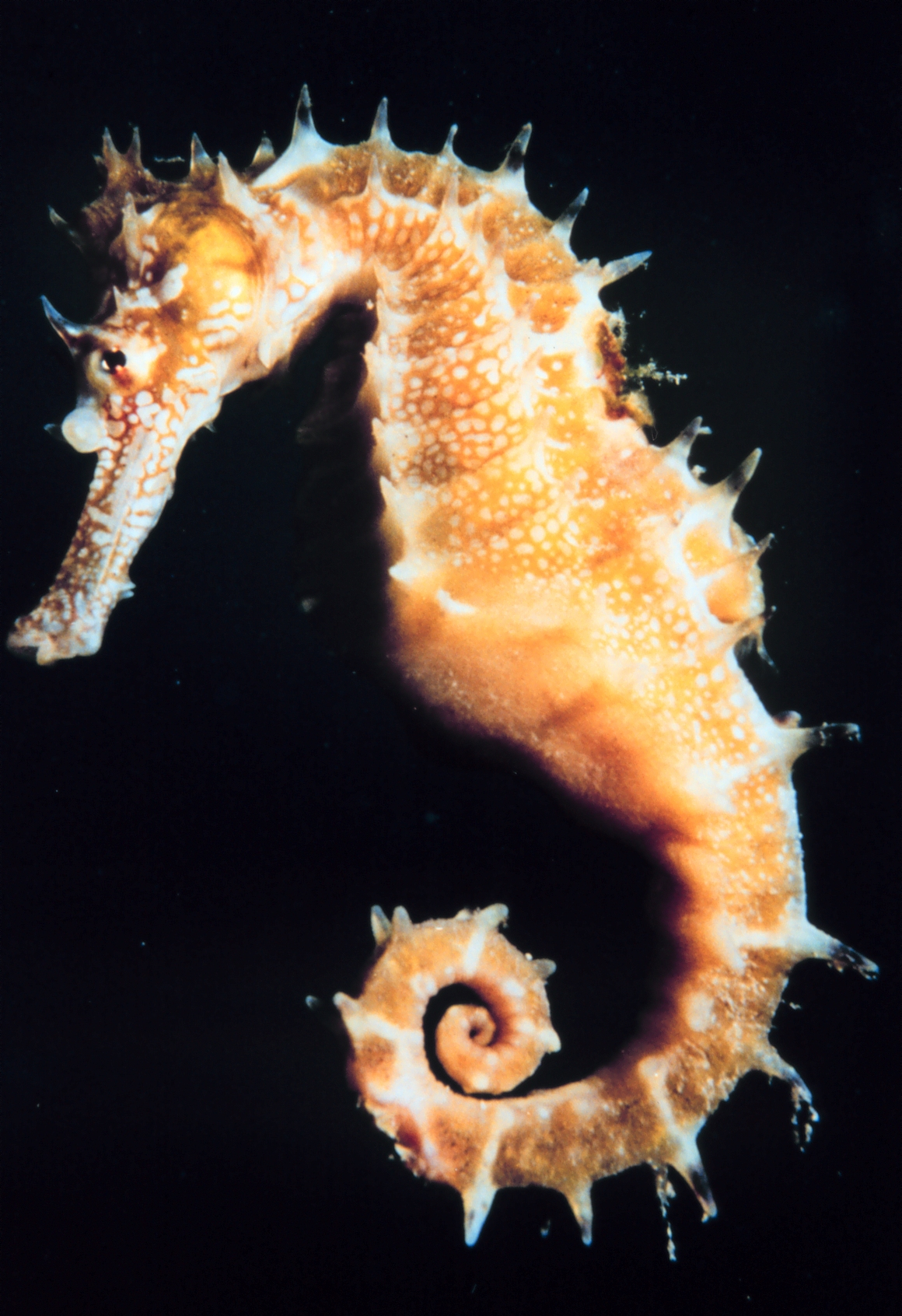
The slowest-moving fishes are the sea horses, often found in reefs. The slowest of these, the dwarf seahorse, attains about five feet per hour.

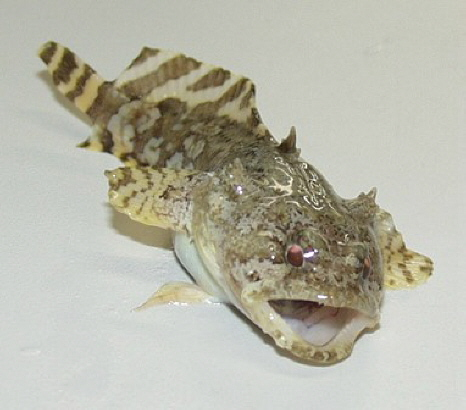
Toadfish often inhabit reefs. Male toadfish "sing" at up to 100 decibels with their swim bladders to attract mates.

== Reef fish adaptations ==
Contrast between coral reef and open water fishes

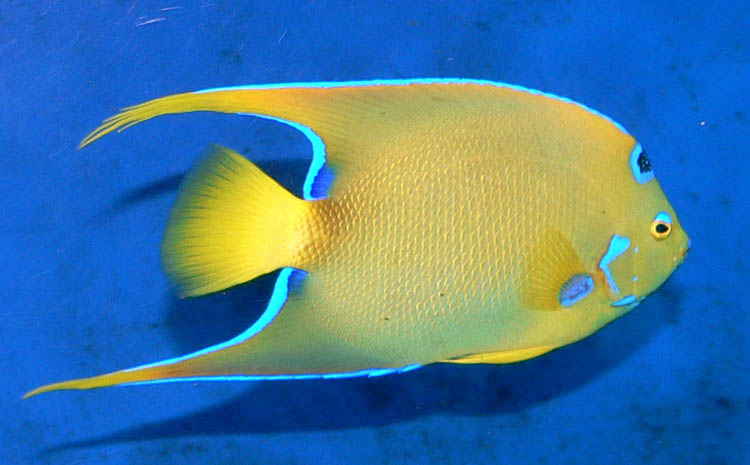
Many reef fish, like this queen angelfish, have a body flattened like a pancake, with pectoral and pelvic fins that act with the flattened body to maximize manoeuvrability.

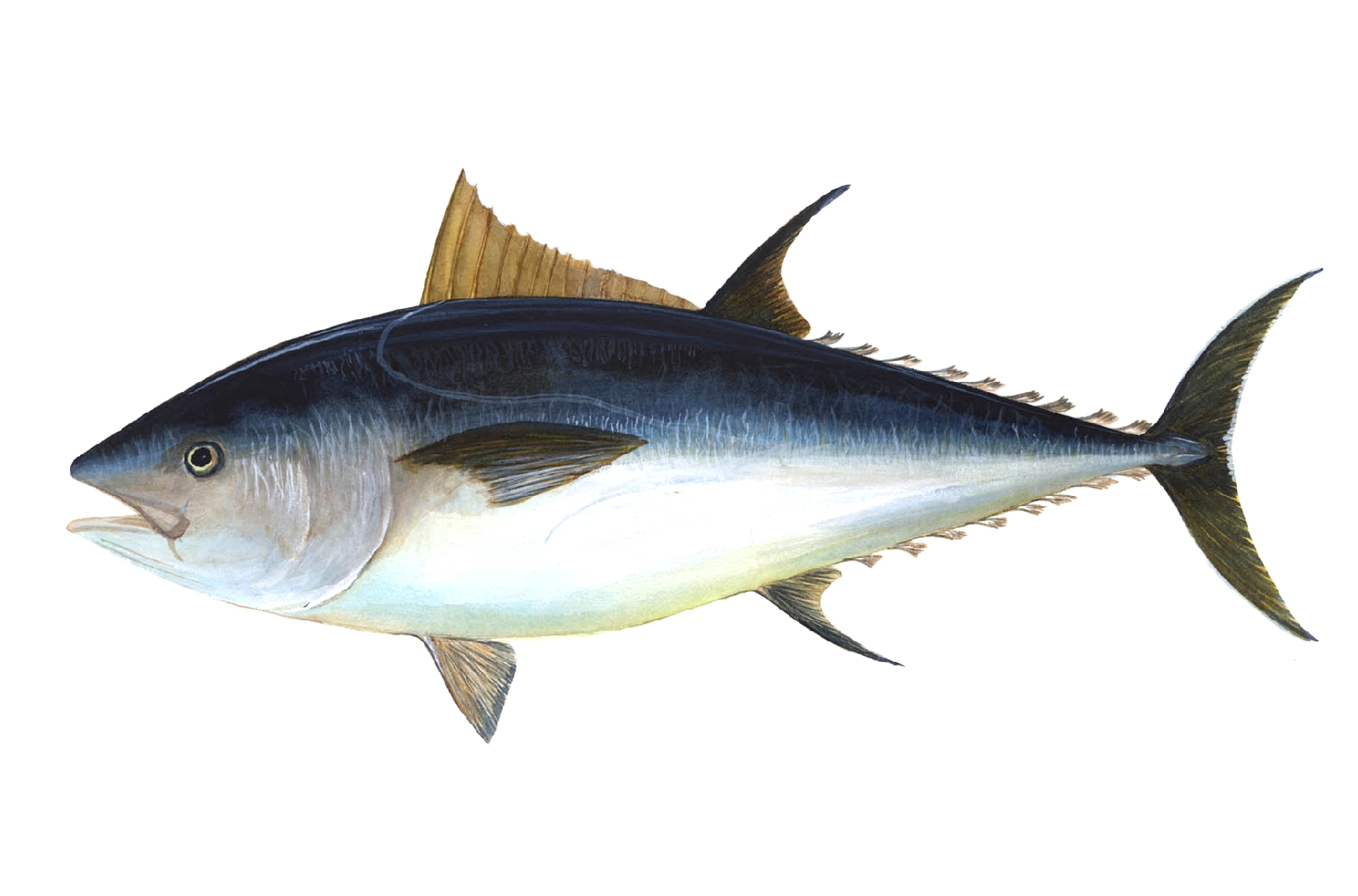
In contrast, open water fish like this Atlantic bluefin tuna, are usually streamlined for straightline speed, with a deeply forked tail and a smooth body shaped like a spindle tapered at both ends. They are countershaded with silvery colours.

=== Body shape ===
Most reef fishes have body shapes that are different from open water fishes. Open water fish are usually built for speed in the open sea, streamlined like torpedoes to minimise friction as they move through the water. Reef fish are operating in the relatively confined spaces and complex underwater landscapes of coral reefs. For this manoeuvrability is more important than straight line speed, so coral reef fish have developed bodies which optimize their ability to dart and change direction. They outwit predators by dodging into fissures in the reef or playing hide and seek around coral heads.

Many reef fish, such as butterflyfish and angelfishes, have evolved bodies which are deep and laterally compressed like a pancake. Their pelvic and pectoral fins are designed differently, so they act together with the flattened body to optimise manoeuvrability.

=== Colouration ===
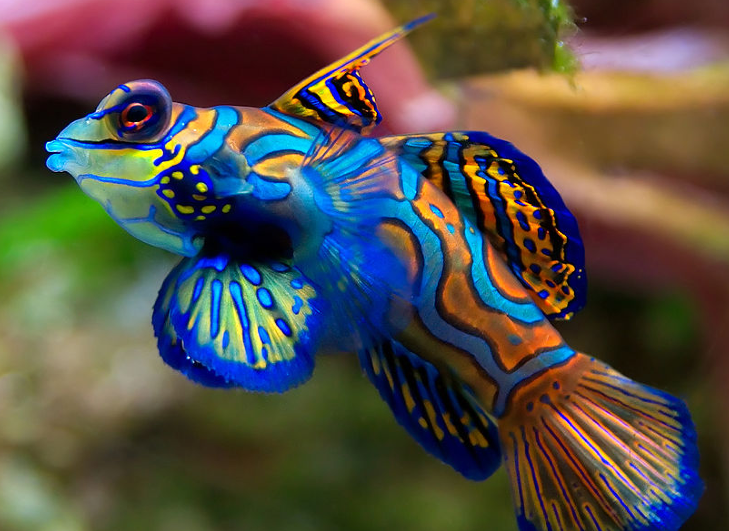
The psychedelic Synchiropus splendidus is one of only two animal species known to have blue colouring because of cellular pigment.

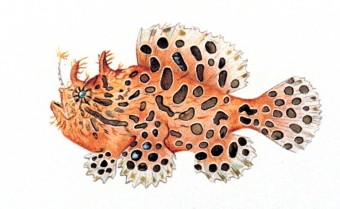
The well camouflaged striated frogfish, a species of anglerfish, is an ambush predator.

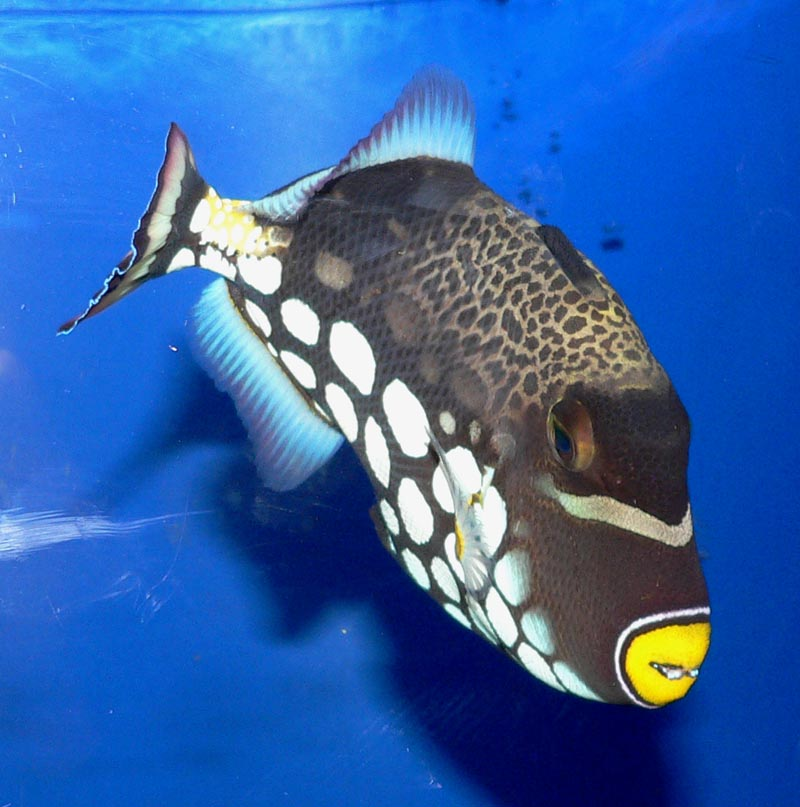
Clown triggerfish. The colouration of triggerfish fade into drabness when they sleep or are being submissive, and return to vividness when they are not threatened.

Coral reef fishes exhibit a huge variety of dazzling and sometimes bizarre colours and patterns. This is in marked contrasts to open water fishes which are usually countershaded with silvery colours.

The patterns have different functions. Sometimes they camouflage the fish when the fish rests in places with the right background. Colouration can also be used to help species recognition during mating. Some unmistakable contrasting patterns are used to warn predators that the fish has venomous spines or poisonous flesh.

The foureye butterflyfish gets its name from a large dark spot on the rear portion of each side of the body. This spot is surrounded by a brilliant white ring, resembling an eyespot. A black vertical bar on the head runs through the true eye, making it hard to see. This can result in a predator thinking the fish is bigger than it is, and confusing the back end with the front end. The butterflyfish's first instinct when threatened is to flee, putting the false eyespot closer to the predator than the head. Most predators aim for the eyes, and this false eyespot tricks the predator into believing that the fish will flee tail first. When escape is not possible, the butterflyfish will sometimes turn to face its aggressor, head lowered and spines fully erect, like a bull about to charge. This may serve to intimidate the other animal or may remind the predator that the butterflyfish is too spiny to make a comfortable meal.

The psychedelic Synchiropus splendidus (right) is not easily seen due to its bottom-feeding habit and its small size, reaching only about 6 cm. It feeds primarily on small crustaceans and other invertebrates, and is popular in the aquarium trade.

Just as some prey species evolved cryptic colouration and patterns to help avoid predators, some ambush predators evolved camouflage that lets them ambush their prey. The tasseled scorpionfish is an ambush predator that looks like part of a sea floor encrusted with coral and algae. It lies in wait on the sea floor for crustaceans and small fish, such as gobies, to pass by. Another ambush predator is the striated frogfish (right). They lie on the bottom and wave a conspicuous worm-like lure strategically attached above their mouth. Normally about 10 cm (4 in) long, they can also inflate themselves like puffers.

Gobies avoid predators by tucking themselves into coral crevices or partly burying themselves in sand. They continually scan for predators with eyes that swivel independently. The camouflage of the tasseled scorpionfish can prevent gobies from seeing them until it's too late.

The clown triggerfish has strong jaws for crushing and eating sea urchins, crustaceans and hard-shell molluscs. Its ventral (lower) surface has large, white spots on a dark background, and its dorsal (upper) surface has black spots on yellow. This is a form of countershading: from below, the white spots look like the lighted surface of the water above; and from above, the fish blends more with the coral reef below. The brightly painted yellow mouth may deter potential predators.

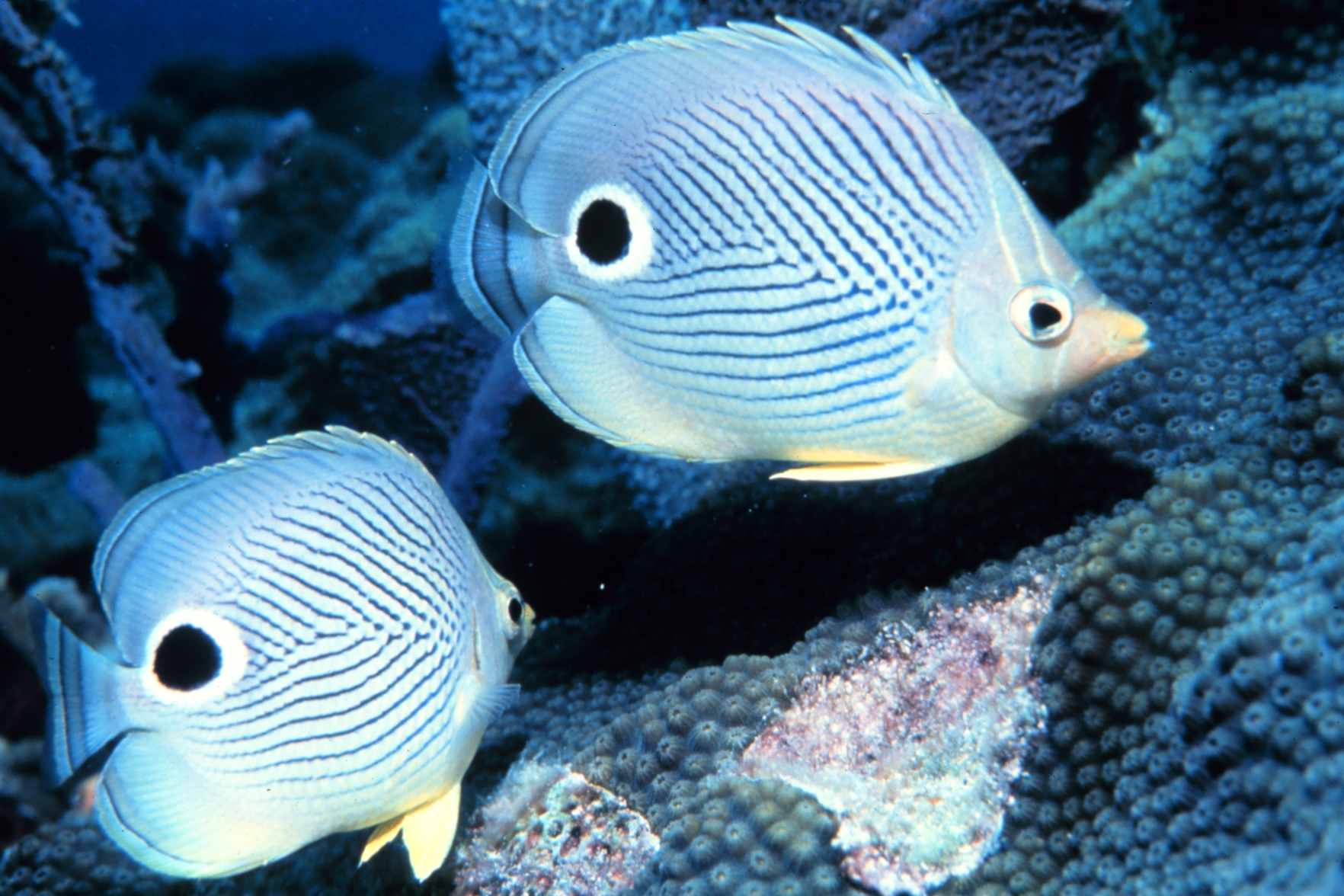
The foureye butterflyfish has false eyes on its back end, confusing predators about which is the front end of the fish.

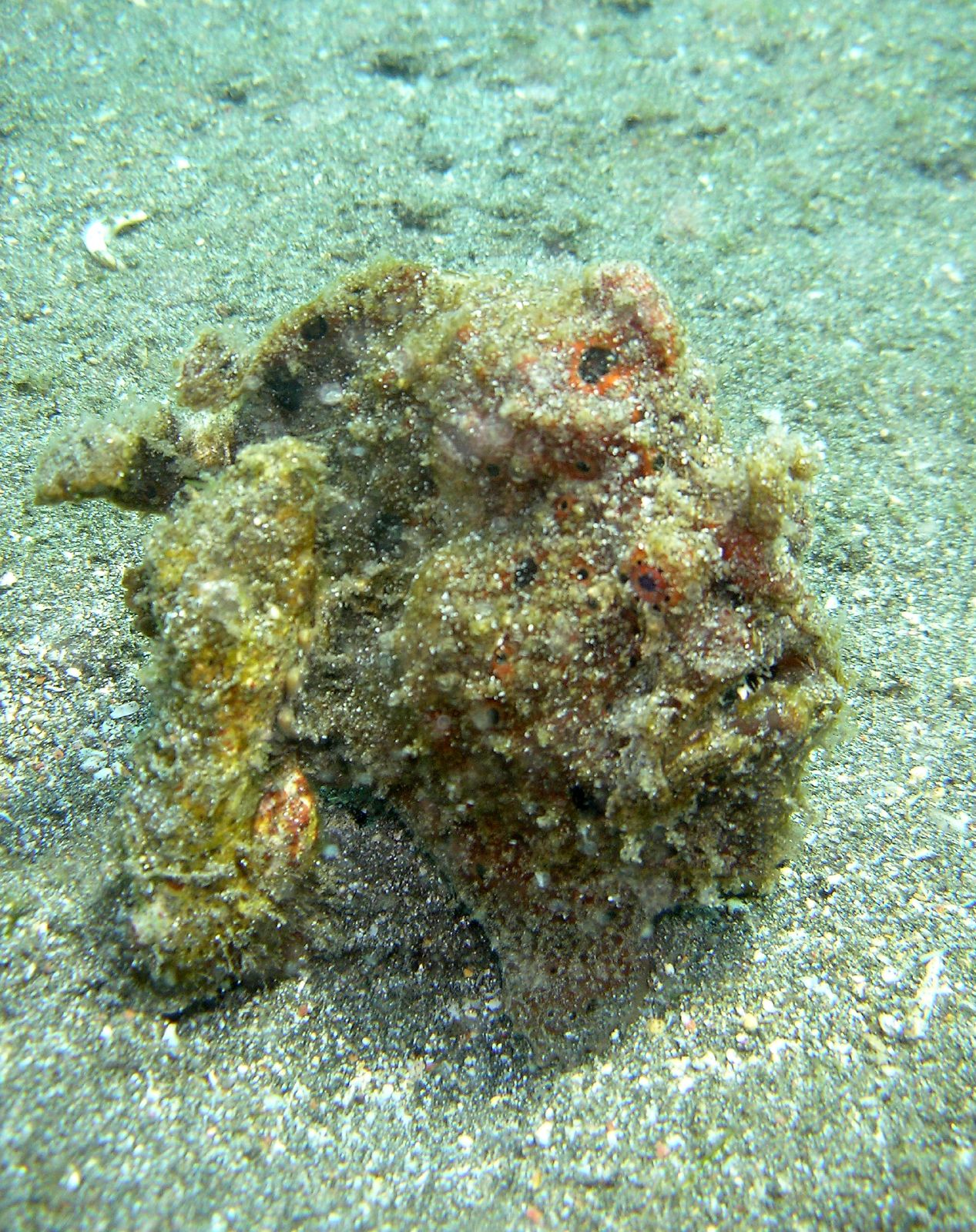
The frogfish is an ambush predator disguised to look like an algae-covered stone

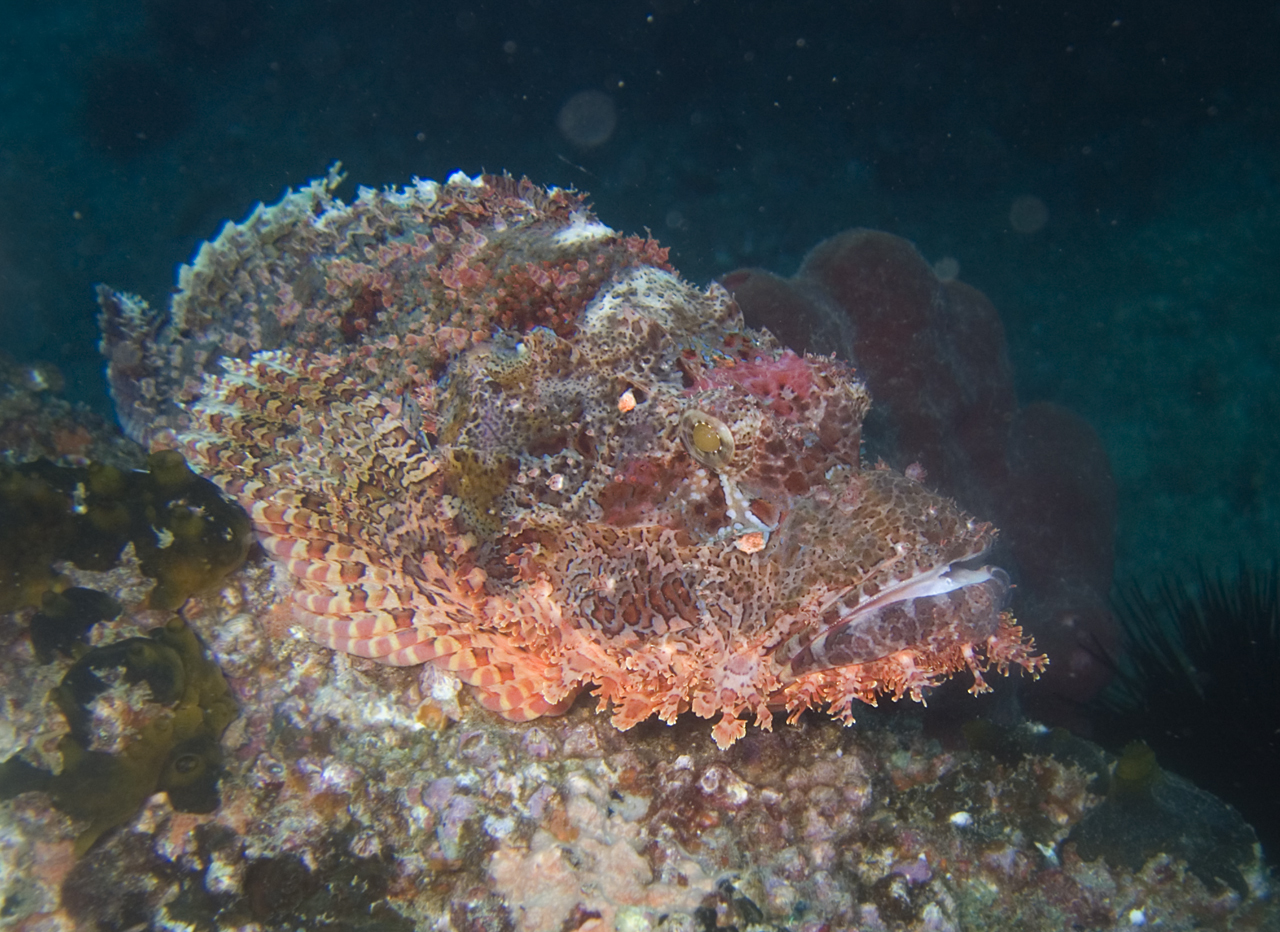
Another ambush predator is the tassled scorpionfish camouflaged to look like part of a coral encrusted sea floor.

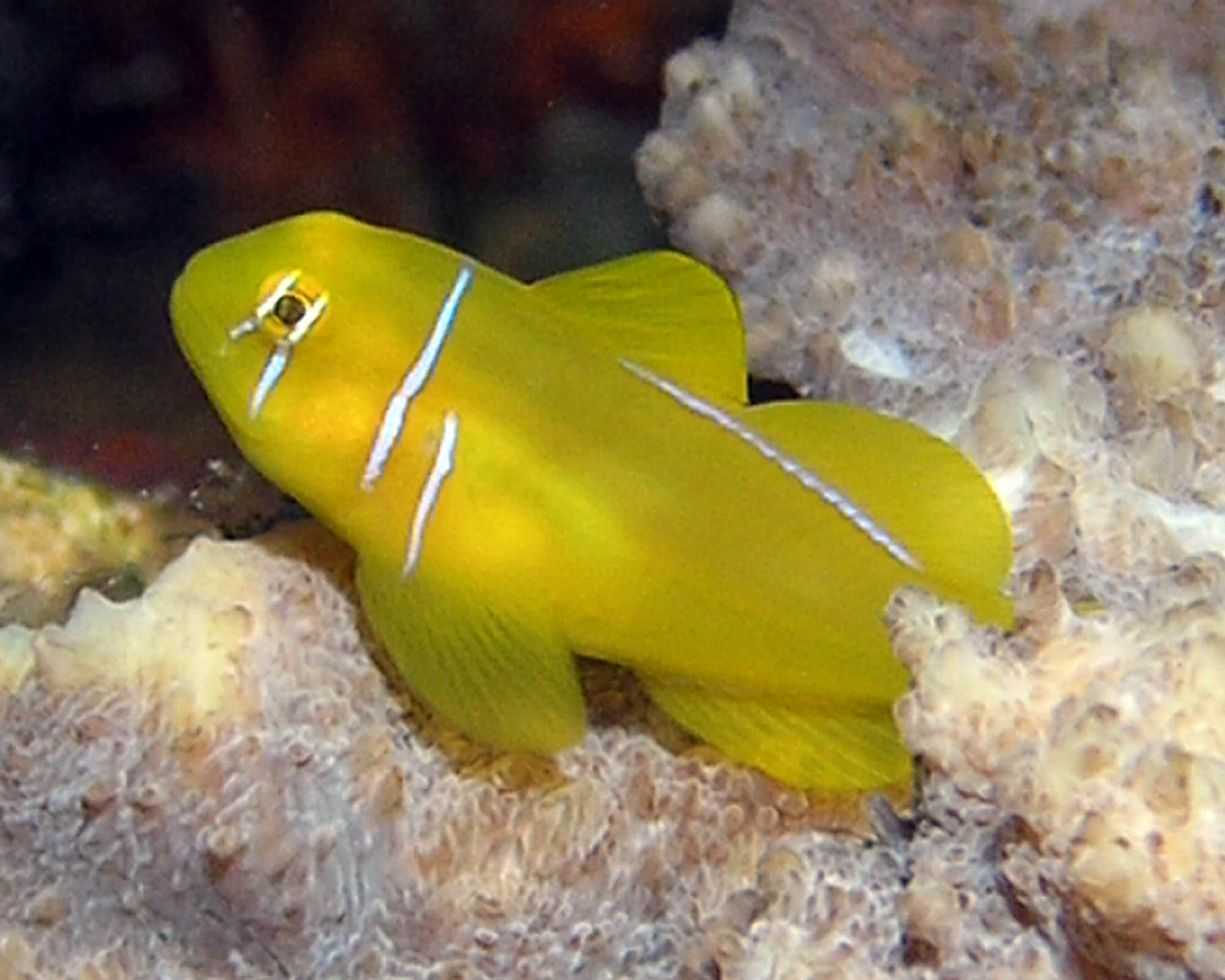
Gobies are very cautious, yet they can fail to see a tassled scorpionfish until it is too late.

== Feeding strategies ==
Many reef fish species have evolved different feeding strategies accompanied by specialized mouths, jaws and teeth particularly suited to deal with their primary food sources found in coral reef ecosystems. Some species even shift their dietary habits and distributions as they mature. This is not surprising, given the huge variety in the types of prey on offer around coral reefs.

For example, the primary food source of butterflyfishes are the coral polyps themselves or the appendages of polychaetes and other small invertebrate animals. Their mouths protrude like forceps, and are equipped with fine teeth that allow them to nip off such exposed body parts of their prey. Parrotfishes eat algae growing on reef surfaces, utilizing mouths like beaks well adapted to scrape off their food. Other fish, like snapper, are generalized feeders with more standard jaw and mouth structures that allow them to forage on a wide range of animal prey types, including small fishes and invertebrates.

=== Generalized carnivores ===
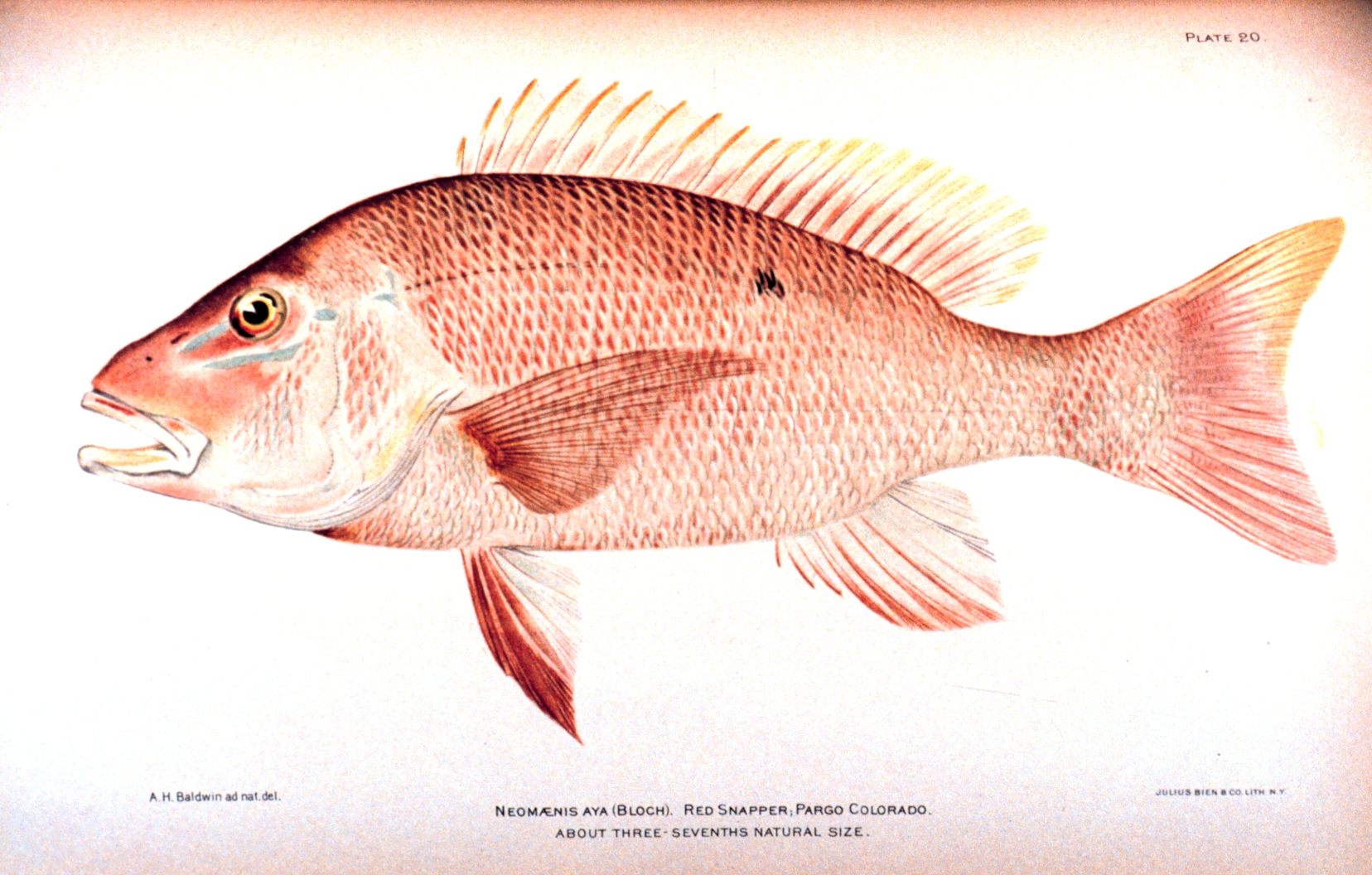
Red snapper, are generalized reef feeders with standard jaw and mouth structures that allow them to eat almost anything, though they prefer small fish and crustaceans.

Carnivores are the most diverse of feeding types among coral reef fishes. There are many more carnivore species on the reefs than herbivores. Competition among carnivores is intense, resulting in a treacherous environment for their prey. Hungry predators lurk in ambush or patrol every part of the reef, night and day.

Some fishes associated with reefs are generalized carnivores that feed on a variety of animal prey. These typically have large mouths that can be rapidly expanded, thereby drawing in nearby water and any unfortunate animals contained within the inhaled water mass. The water is then expelled through the gills with the mouth closed, thereby trapping the helpless prey For example, the bluestripe snapper has a varied diet, feeding on fishes, shrimps, crabs, stomatopods, cephalopods and planktonic crustaceans, as well as plant and algae material. Diet varies with age, location and the prevalent prey items locally.

Goatfish are tireless benthic feeders, using a pair of long chemosensory barbels (whiskers) protruding from their chins to rifle through the sediments in search of a meal. Like goats, they seek anything edible: worms, crustaceans, molluscs and other small invertebrates are staples. The yellowfin goatfish (Mulloidichthys vanicolensis) often schools with the blue-striped snapper. The yellowfins change their colouration to match that of the snapper. Presumably this is for predator protection, since goatfish are a more preferred prey than bluestripe snapper. By night the schools disperse and individual goatfish head their separate ways to loot the sands. Other nocturnal feeders shadow the active goatfish, waiting patiently for overlooked morsels.

Moray eels and coral groupers (Plectropomus pessuliferus) are known to cooperate with each other when hunting. Grouper are protogynous hermaphrodites, who school in harems that can vary greatly in size according to the population size and reef habitat. When no male is available, in each school the largest female shifts sex to male. If the final male disappears, changes to the largest female occur, with male behavior occurring within several hours and sperm production occurring within ten days.

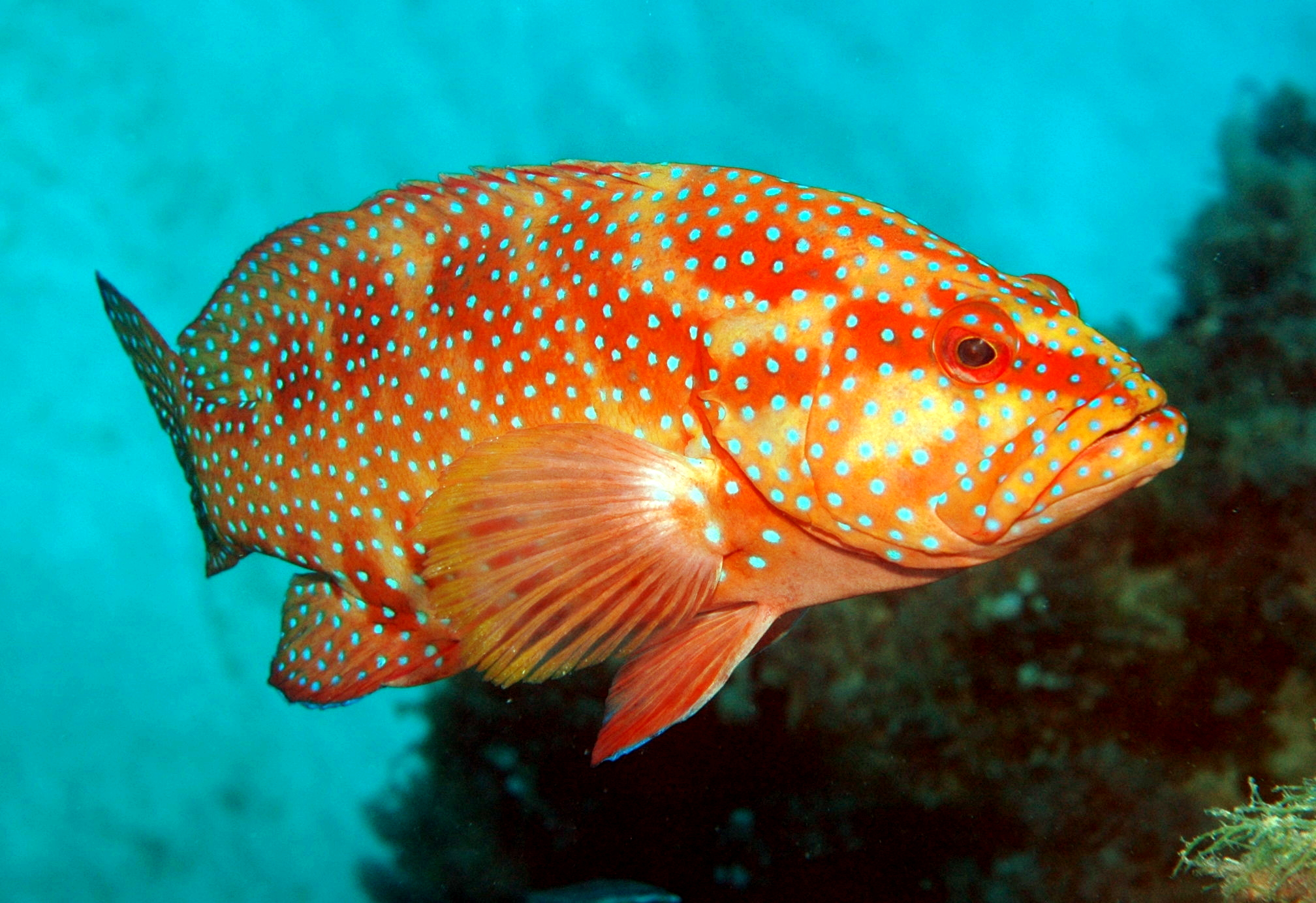
Adult coral trout hunt a variety of reef fish, particularly damselfish, while their juveniles mostly eat crustaceans such as prawns.

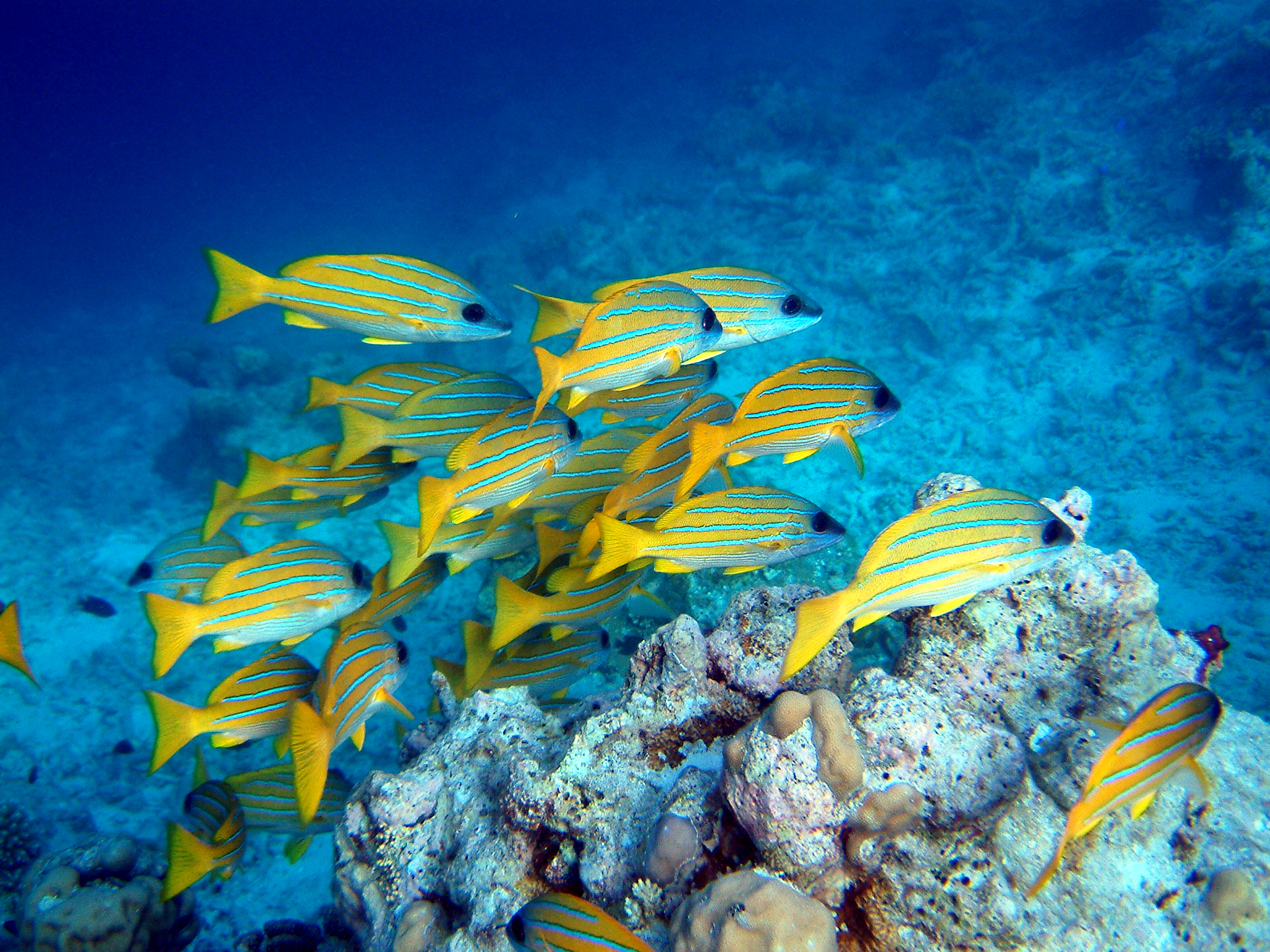
Bluestripe snapper will eat just about anything.

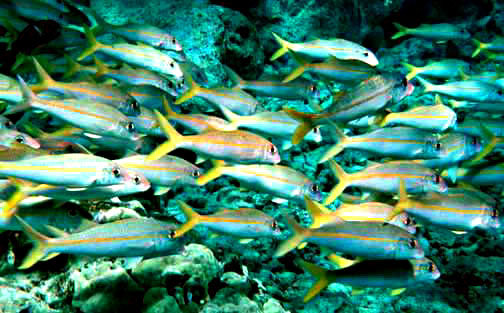
Yellowfin goatfish change their colouration so they can school with the blue-striped snapper.

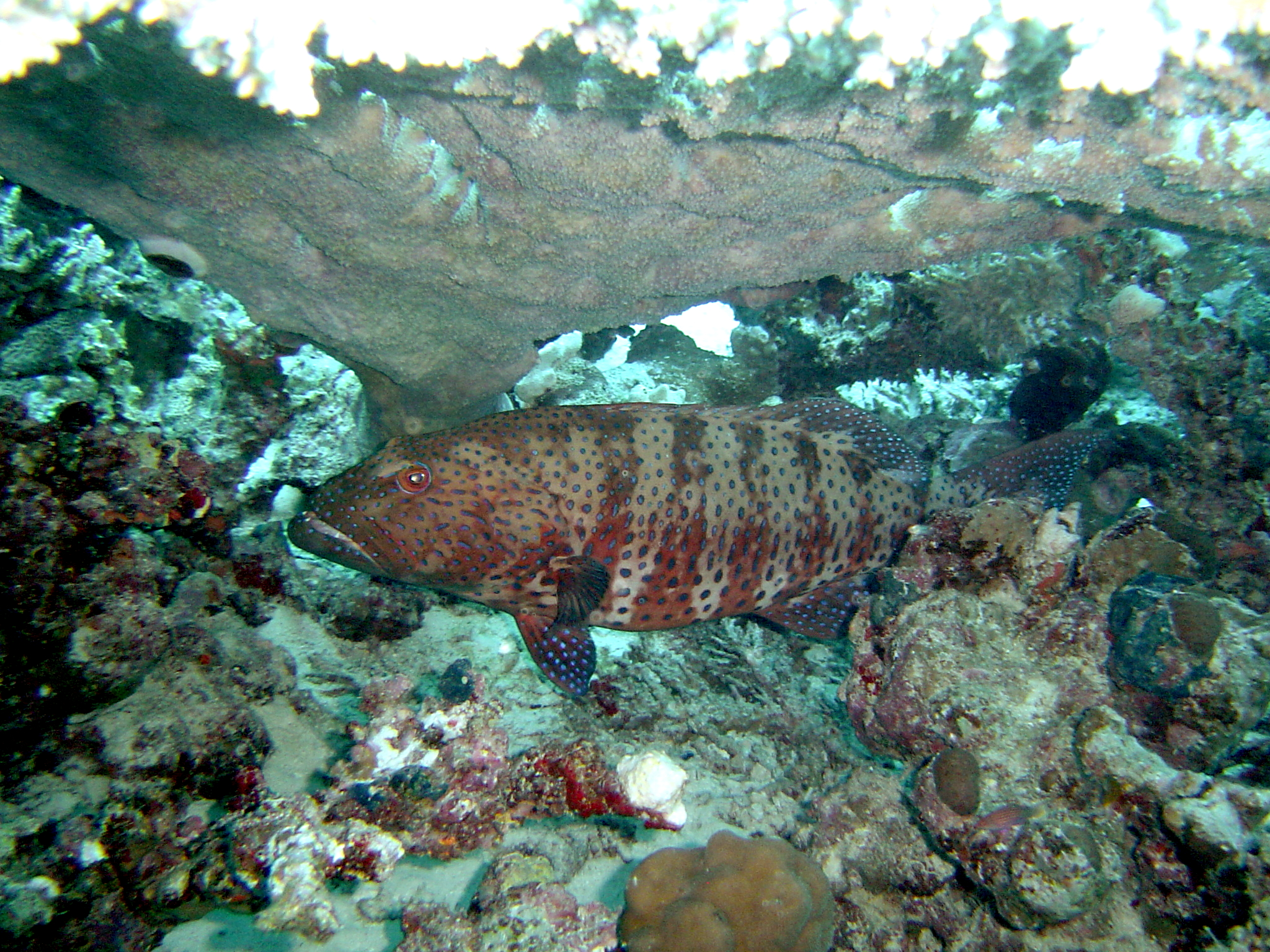
Coral grouper sometimes cooperate with giant morays in hunting.

=== Specialised carnivores ===
Large schools of forage fish, such as surgeonfish and cardinalfish, move around the reef feeding on tiny zooplankton. The forage fish are, in turn, eaten by larger fish, such as the bigeye trevally. Fish receive many benefits from schooling behaviour, including defence against predators through better predator detection, since each fish is on the lookout. Schooling fish have developed remarkable displays of precise choreography which confuse and evade predators. For this they have evolved special pressure sensors along their sides, called lateral lines, that let them feel each other's movements and stay synchronized.

Bigeye trevally also form schools. They are swift predators who patrol the reef in hunting packs. When they find a school of forage fish, such as cardinalfish, they surround them and herd them close to the reef. This panics the prey fish, and their schooling becomes chaotic, leaving them open to attack by the trevally.

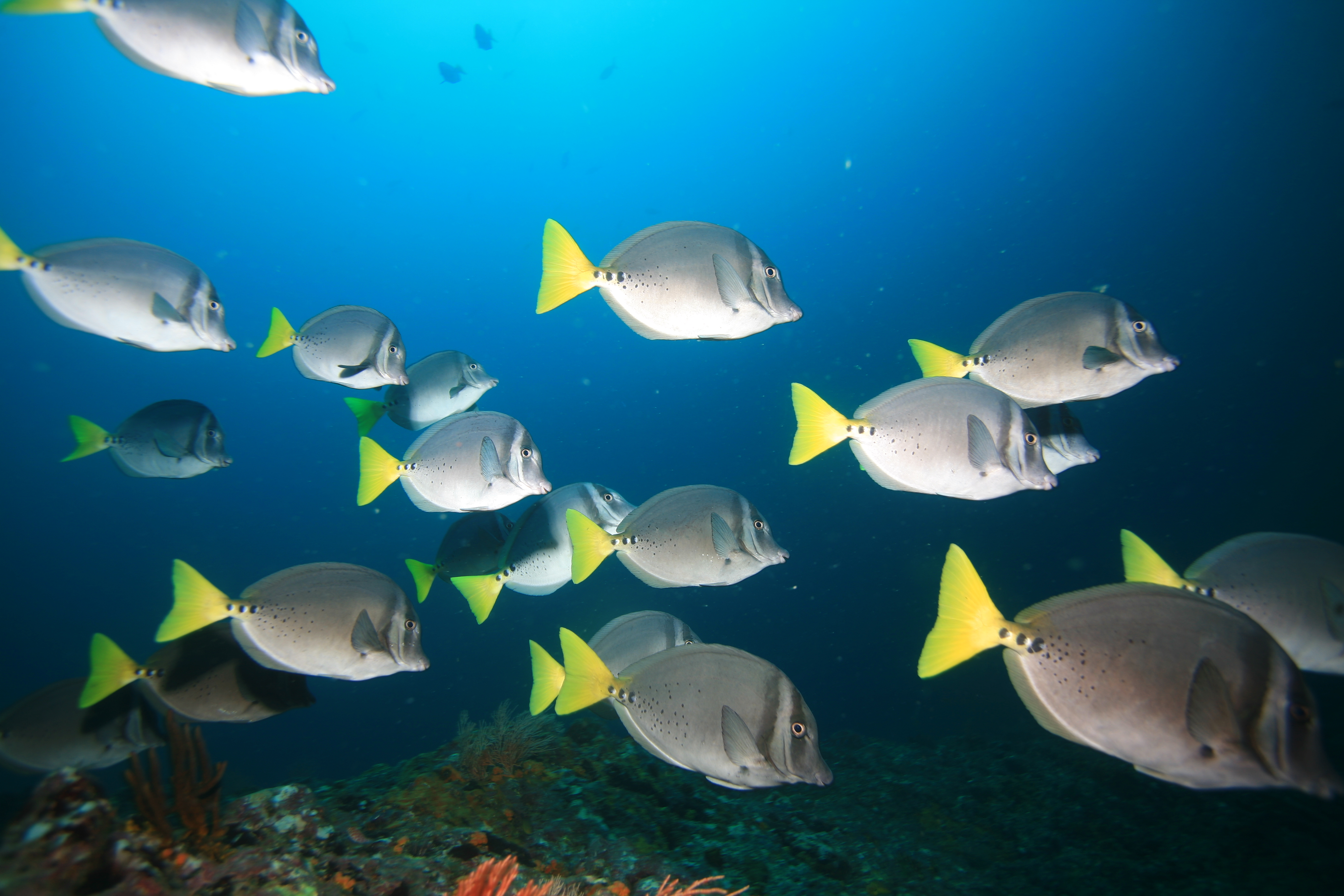
Many small reef fishes gain advantages by schooling.

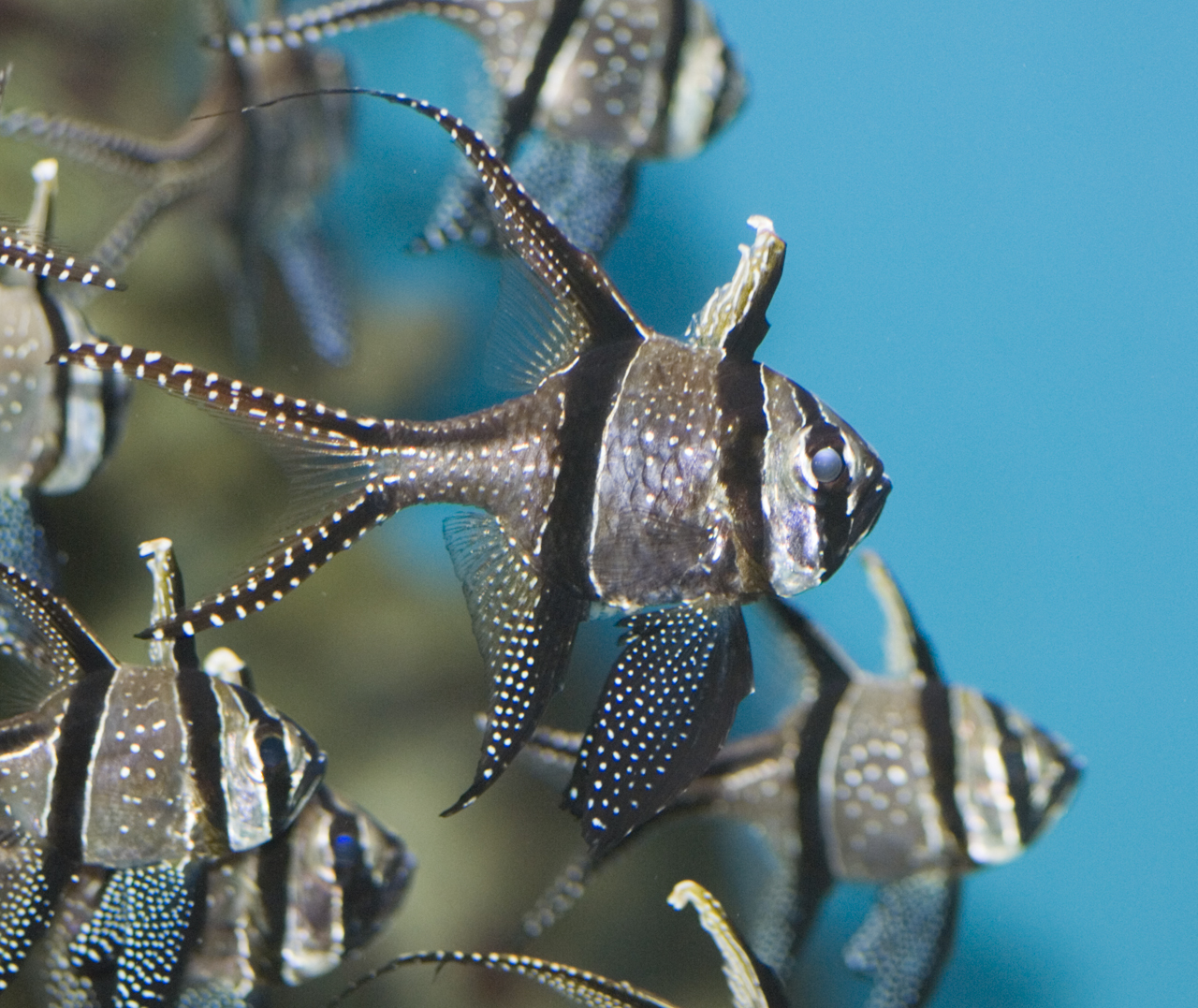
Cardinalfish swim in schools for protection against trevally.

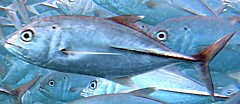
Bigeye trevally hunt cardinalfish in packs and herd them against the reef. When the cardinalfish panic and break school formation, the trevally pick them off.

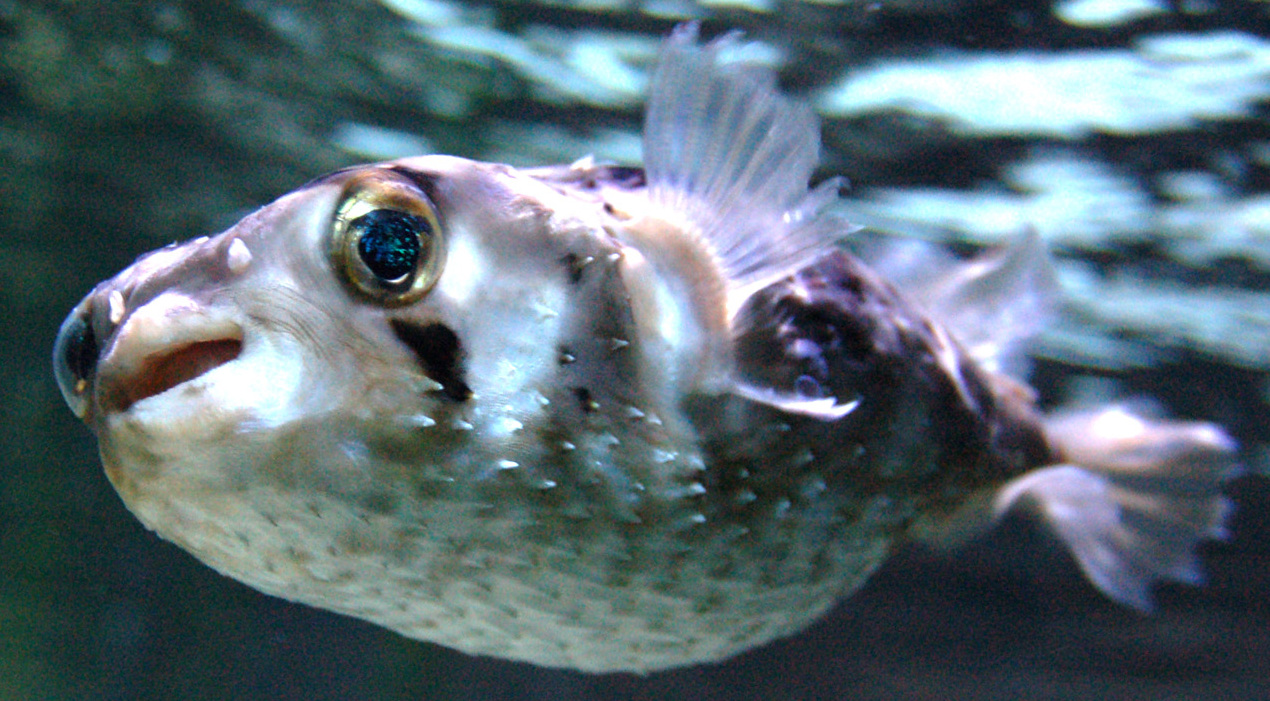
Porcupinefish inflate themselves by swallowing water or air, which restricts potential predators to those with bigger mouths.

The titan triggerfish can move relatively large rocks when feeding and is often followed by smaller fishes that feed on leftovers. They also use a jet of water to uncover sand dollars buried in sand.

Barracuda are ferocious predators on other fishes, with razor-sharp conical teeth which make it easy for them to rip their prey to shreds. Barracuda patrol the outer reef in large schools, and are extremely fast swimmers with streamlined, torpedo-shaped bodies.

Porcupinefish are medium to large sized, and are usually found swimming among or near coral reefs. They inflate their body by swallowing water, reducing potential predators to those with much bigger mouths.

External image
- Giant moray with cleaner wrasses
- Porcupinefish with cleaner wrasses

Fish can not groom themselves. Some fish specialise as cleaner fish, and establish cleaning stations where other fish can come to have their parasites nibbled away. The "resident fish doctor and dentist on the reef is the bluestreak cleaner wrasse". The bluestreak is marked with a conspicuous bright blue stripe and behaves in a stereotypical way which attracts larger fish to its cleaning station. As the bluestreak snacks on the parasites it gently tickles its client. This seems to bring the larger fish back again for regular servicing.

The reef lizardfish secretes a mucus coating which reduces drag when they swim and also protects it from some parasites. But other parasites find the mucus itself good to eat. So lizardfish visit the cleaner wrasse, which clean the parasites from the skin, gills and mouth.

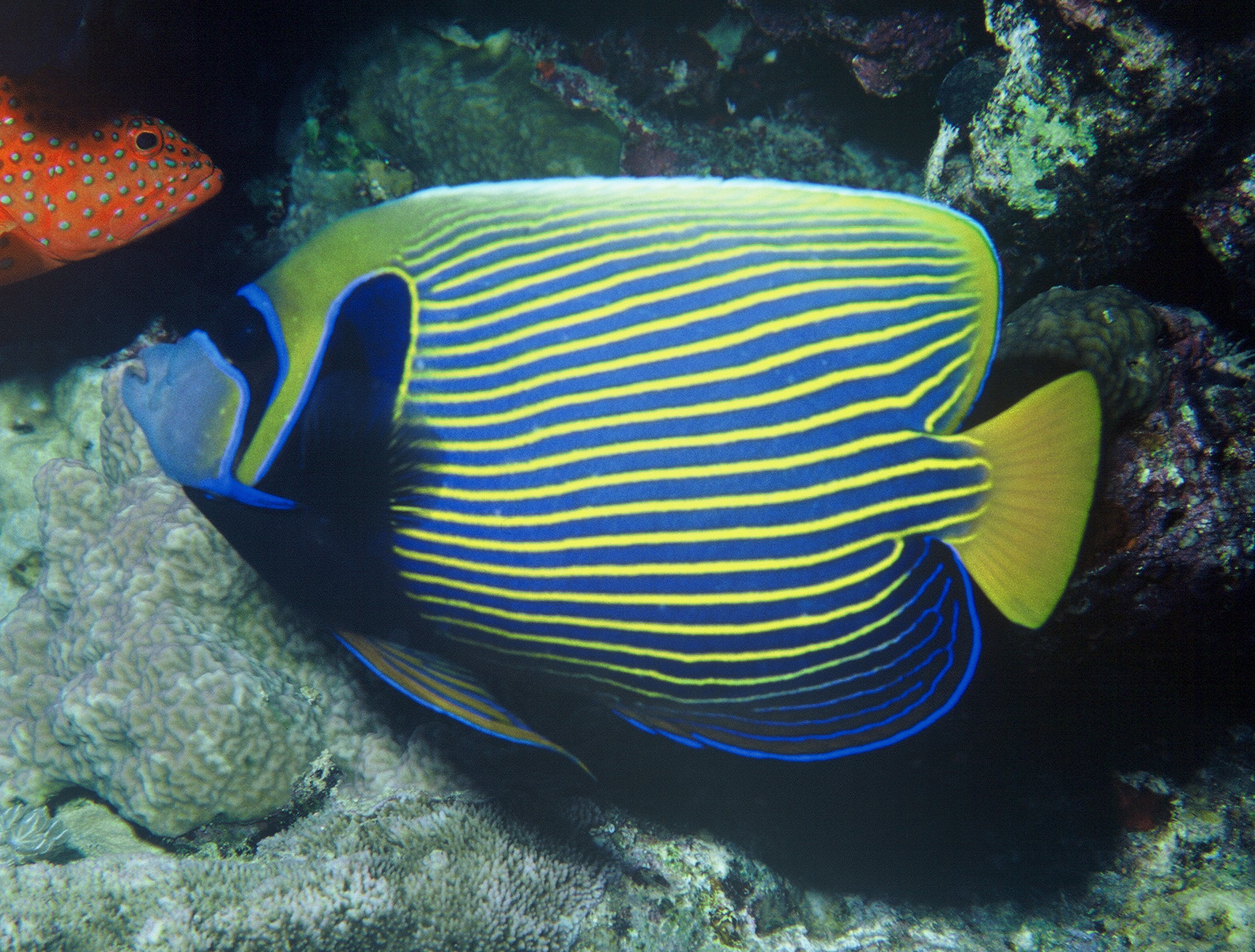
The Emperor angelfish feeds on coral and sponges.

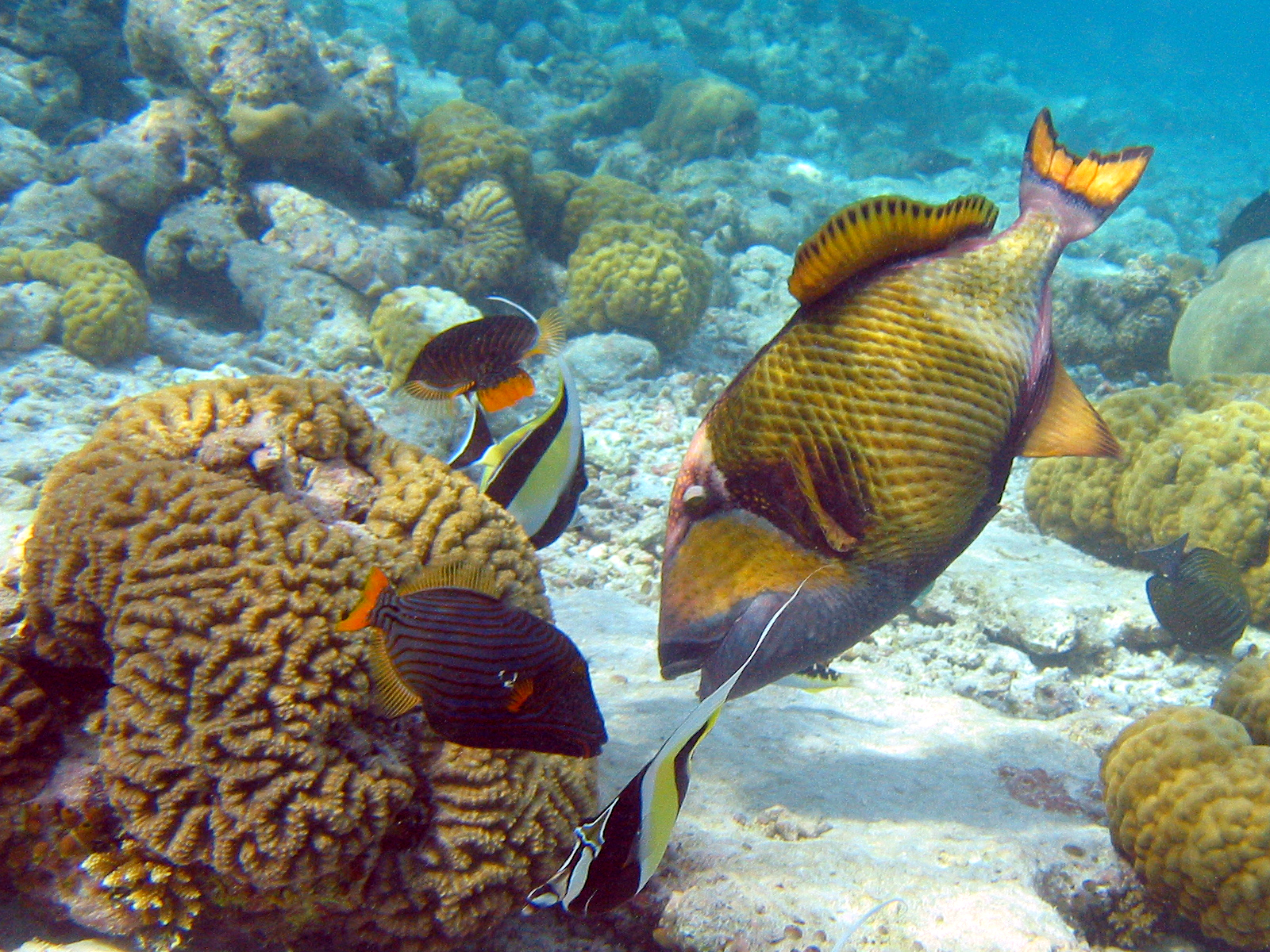
The titan triggerfish followed by small orange-lined triggerfish and moorish idol that feed on leftovers

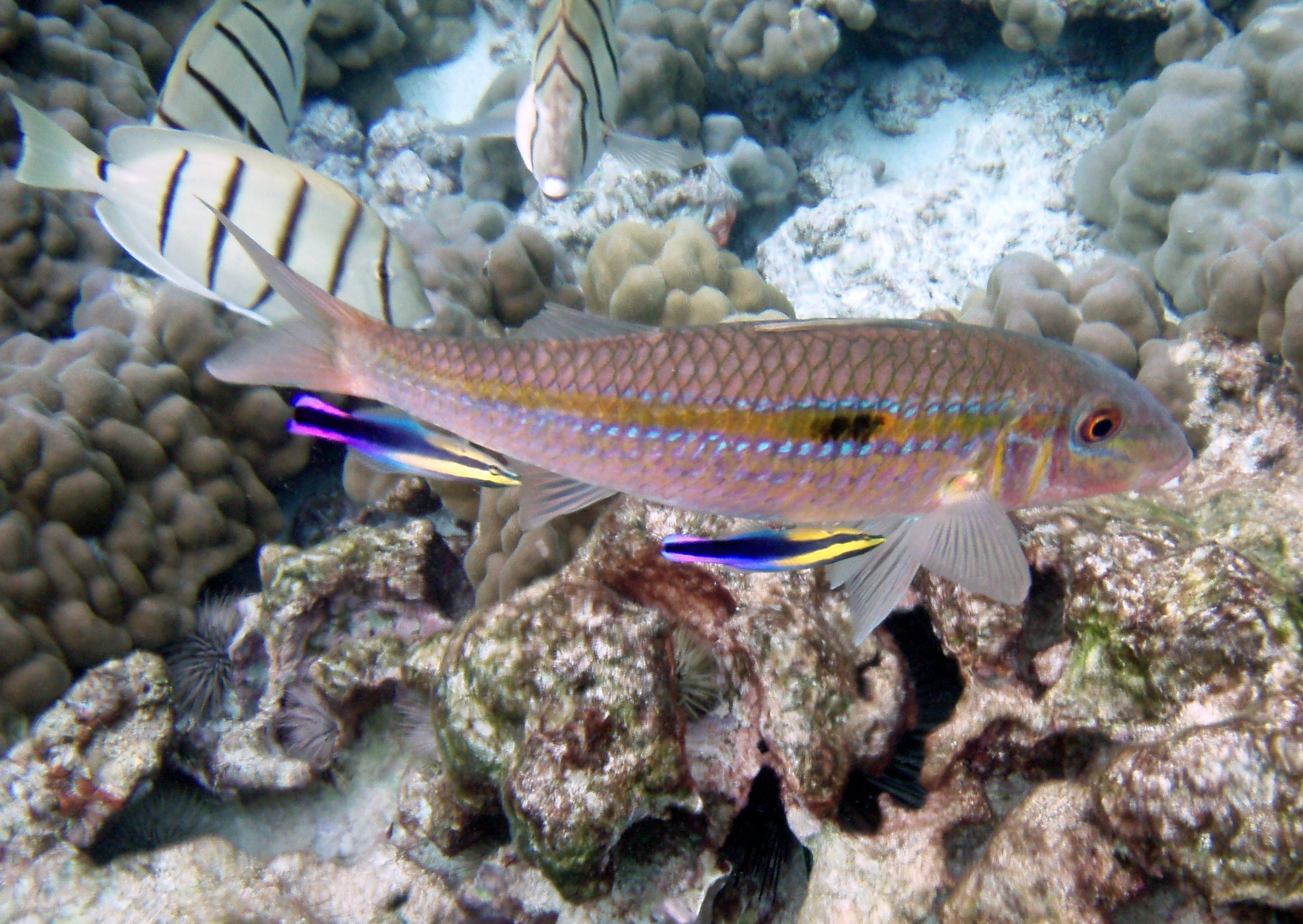
Two small cleaner wrasses servicing a larger fish at a cleaning station

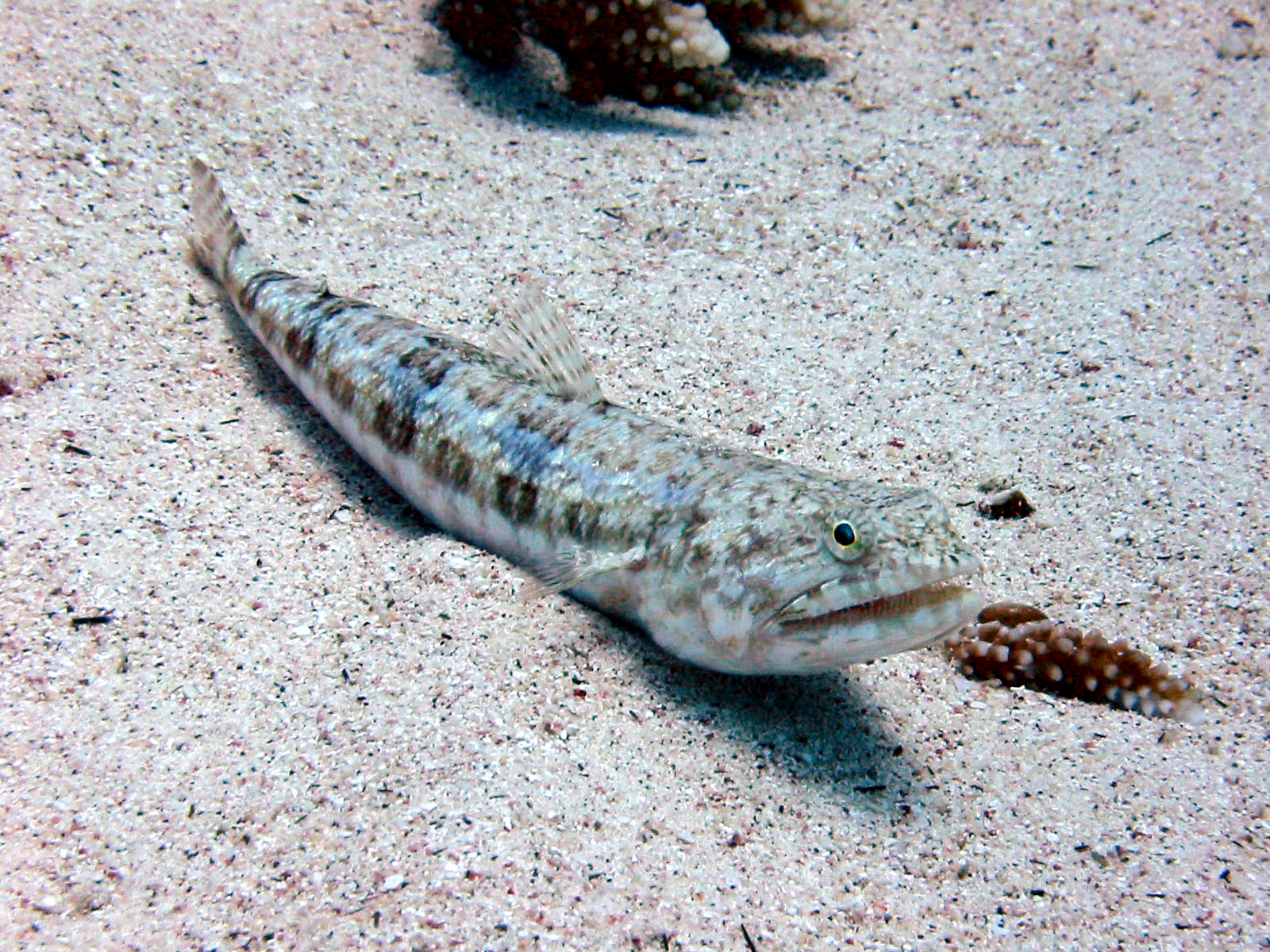
The reef lizardfish secretes a mucus coating which reduces drag when they swim. But some parasites find the mucus good to eat.

=== Herbivores ===
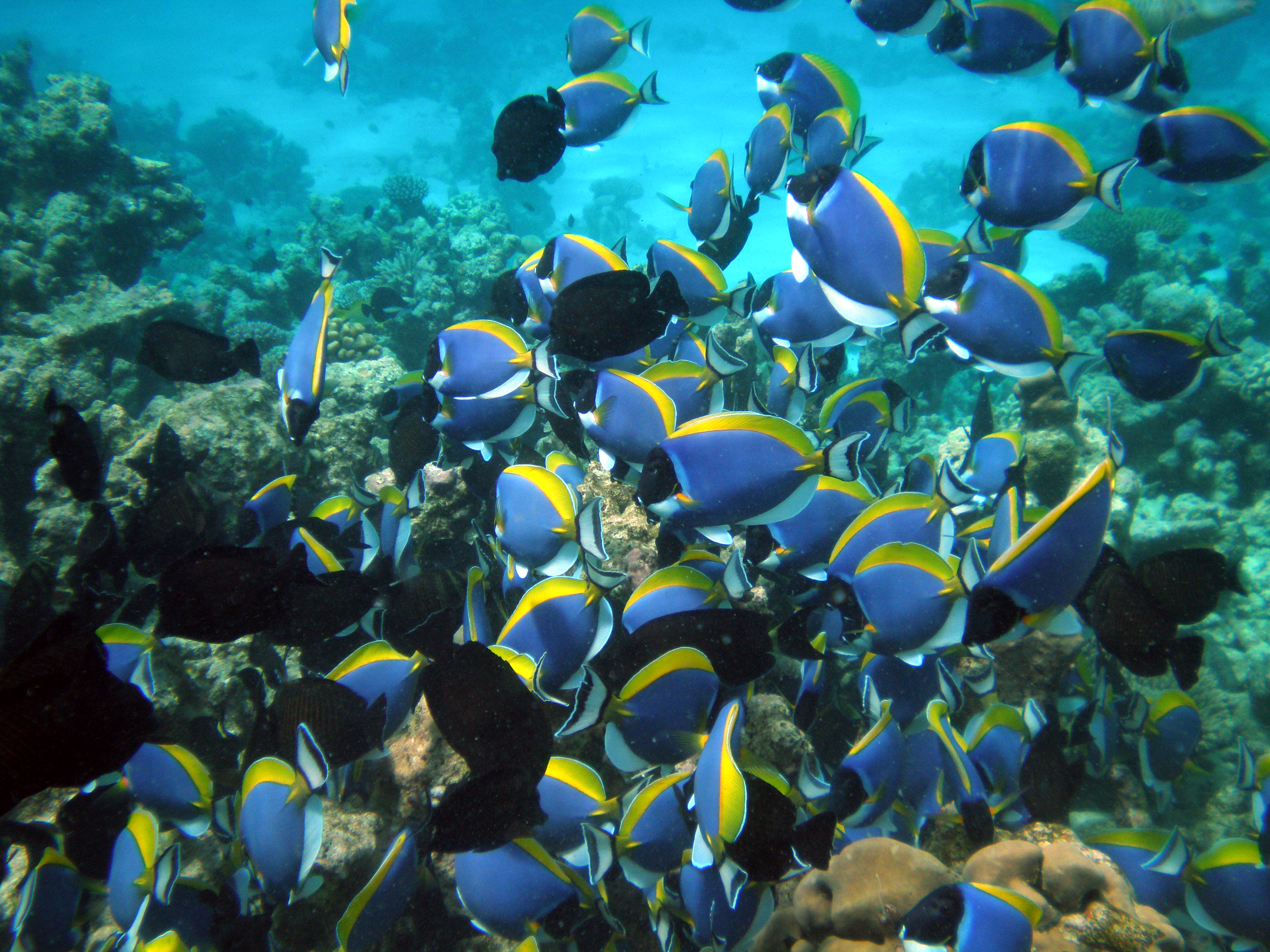
Surgeonfish are among the most common of coral reef herbivores, often feeding in shoals. This may be a mechanism for overwhelming the highly aggressive defence responses of small territorial damselfishes that vigorously guard small patches of algae on coral reefs.

Herbivores feed on plants. The four largest groups of coral reef fishes that feed on plants are the parrotfishes, damselfishes, rabbitfishes, and surgeonfishes. All feed primarily on microscopic and macroscopic algae growing on or near coral reefs.

Algae can drape reefs in kaleidoscopes of colours and shapes. Algae are primary producers, which means they are plants synthesising food directly from solar energy and carbon dioxide and other simple nutrient molecules. Without algae, everything on the reef would die. One important algal group, the bottom dwelling (benthic) algae, grows over dead coral and other inert surfaces, and provides grazing fields for herbivores such as parrotfish.

Parrotfish are named for their parrot-like beaks and bright colours. They are large herbivores that graze on the algae that grows on hard dead corals. Equipped with two pairs of crushing jaws and their beaks, they pulverize chunks of algae-coated coral, digesting the algae and excreting the coral as fine sand.

Smaller parrotfish are relatively defenceless herbivores, poorly defended against predators like barracuda. They have evolved to find protection by schooling, sometimes with other species like shoaling rabbitfish. Spinefoot rabbitfish are named for their defensive venomous spines, and they are seldom attacked by predators. Spines are a last-ditch defence. It is better to avoid predator detection in the first place, and avoid being thrust into risky spine-to-fang battles. So rabbitfish have also evolved skilful colour changing abilities.

Damselfish are a group of species that feed on zooplankton and algae, and are an important reef forage fish for larger predators. They are small, typically five centimetres (two inches) long. Many species are aggressive towards other fishes which also graze on algae, such as surgeonfish. Surgeonfish sometimes use schooling as a countermeasure to defensive attacks by solitary damselfish.

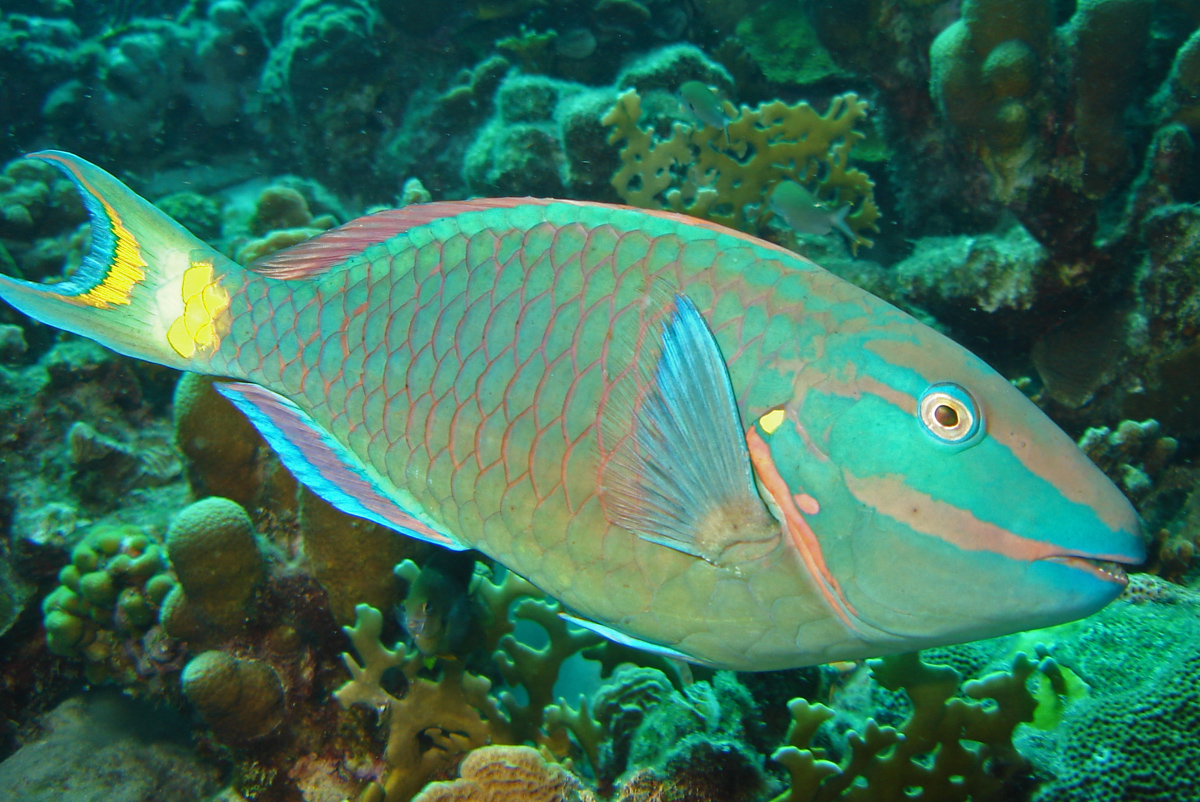
Relatively defenceless parrotfish feed on algae.

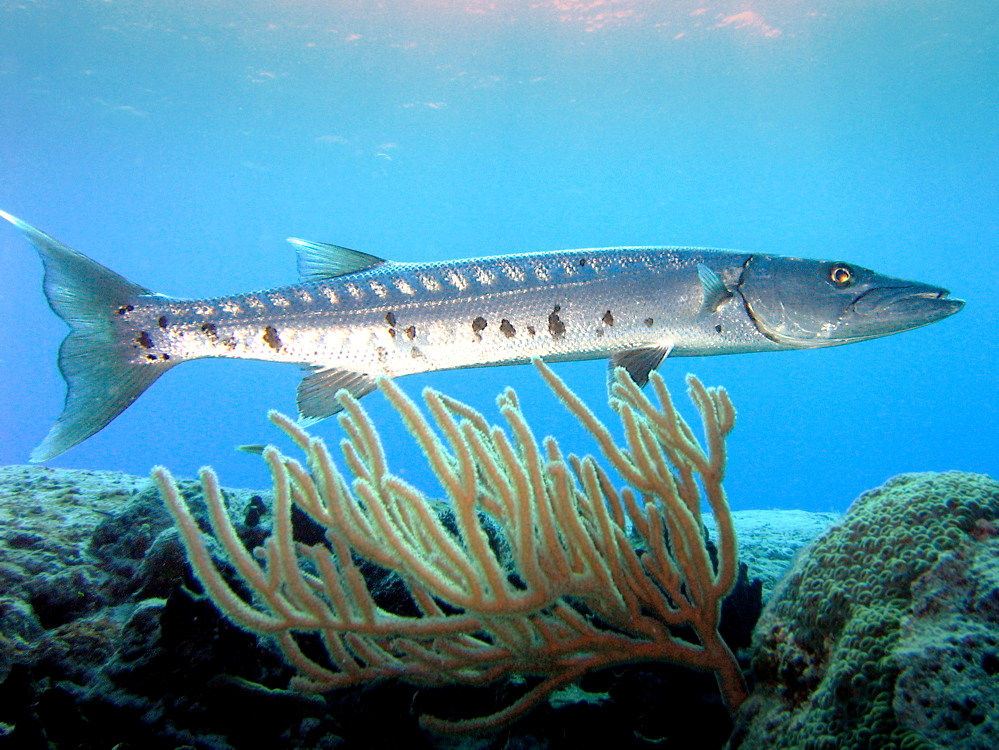
Ferocious barracuda prey in schools on parrotfish.

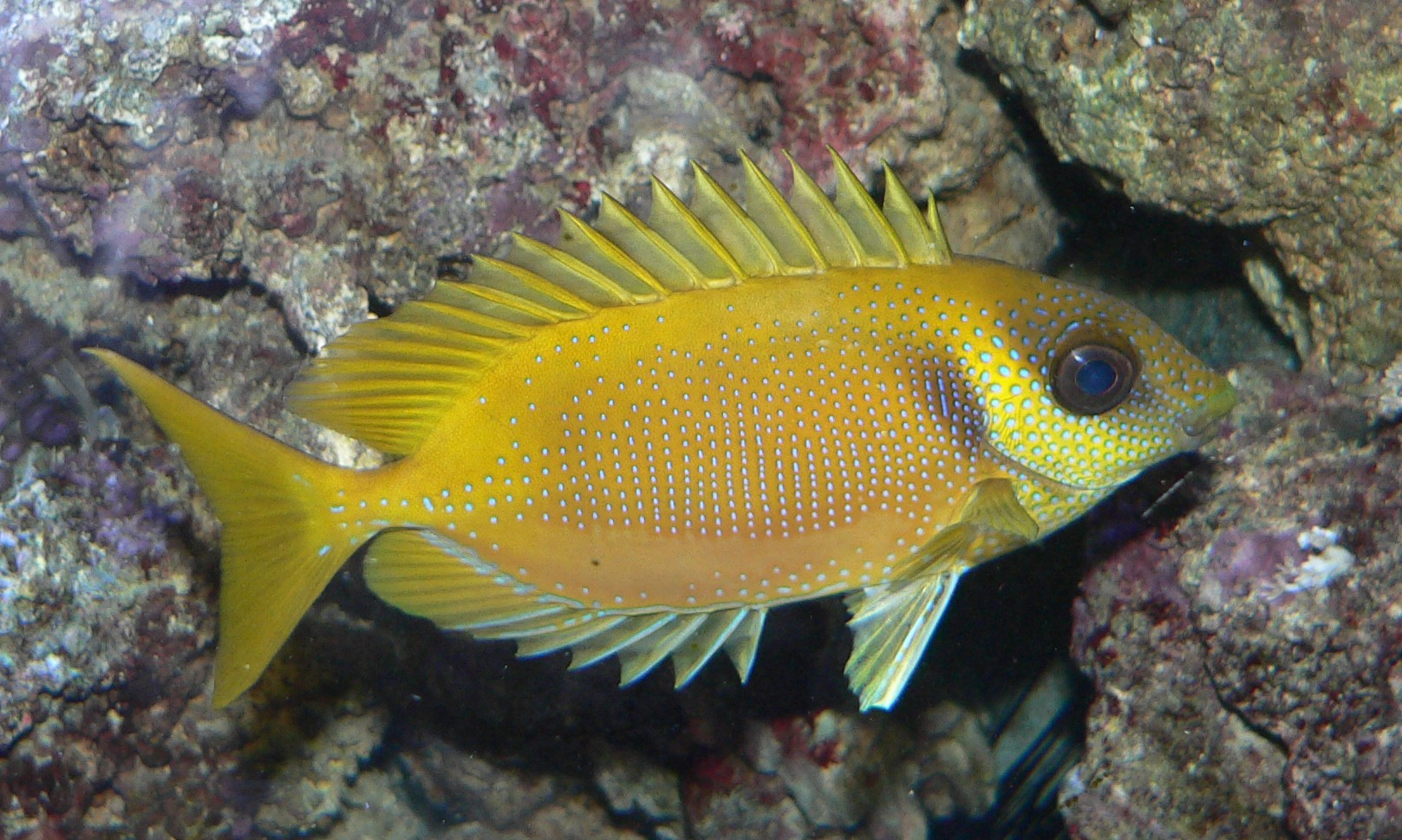
Coral rabbitfish have venomous spines which they erect if threatened.

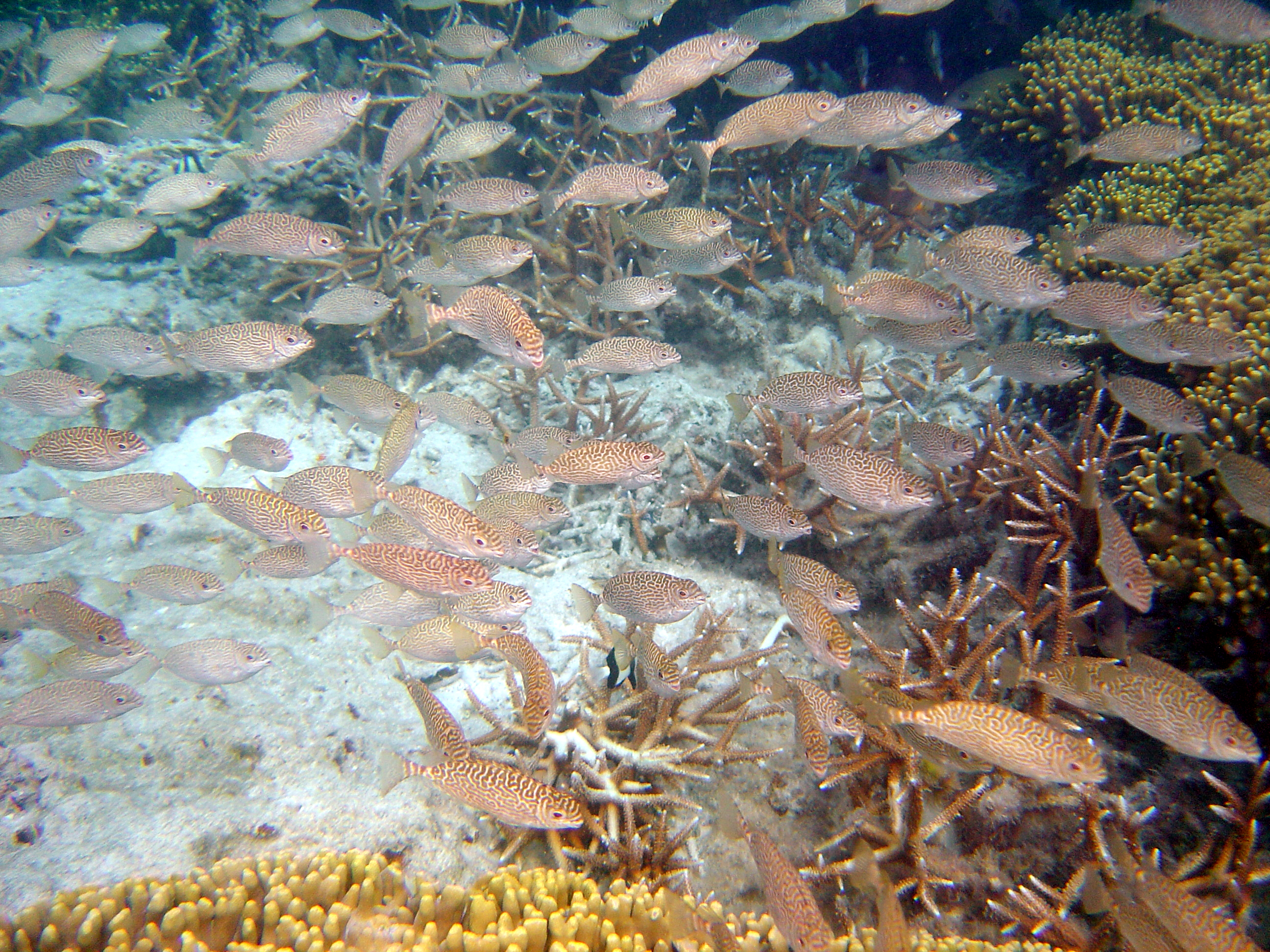
Schooling spinefoot rabbitfish are often joined by defenceless parrotfish.

== Symbiosis ==
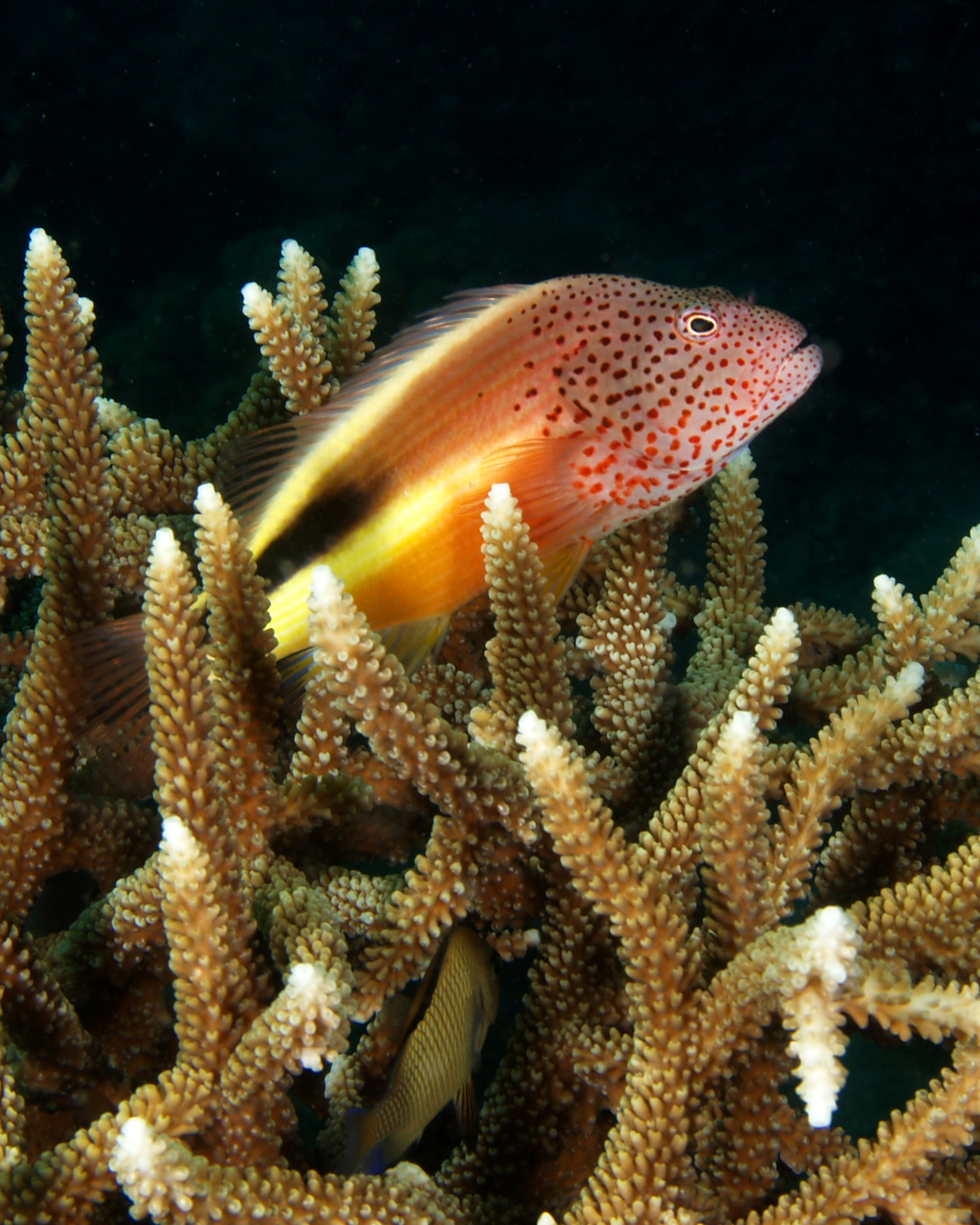
A hawkfish, safely perched on Acropora, surveys its surroundings.

Symbiosis refers to two species that have a close relationship with each other. The relationship can be mutualistic, when both species benefit from the relationship, commensalistic, when one species benefits and the other is unaffected, and parasitistic, when one species benefits, and the other is harmed.

An example of commensalism occurs between the hawkfish and fire coral. Thanks to their large, skinless pectoral fins, hawkfish can perch on fire corals without harm. Fire corals are not true corals, but are hydrozoans possessing stinging cells called nematocysts which would normally prevent close contact. The protection fire corals offer hawkfish means the hawkfish has the high ground of the reef, and can safely survey its surroundings like a hawk. Hawkfish usually stay motionless, but dart out and grab crustaceans and other small invertebrates as they pass by. They are mostly solitary, although some species form pairs and share a head of coral.

A more bizarre example of commensalism occurs between the slim, eel-shaped pinhead pearlfish and a particular species of sea cucumber. The pearlfish enters the sea cucumber through its anus, and spends the day safely protected inside the sea cucumber's alimentary tract. At night it emerges the same way and feeds on small crustaceans.

External images
- Pearlfish emerging from a sea cucumber
- Clownfish swimming among coral

Sea anemones are common on reefs. The tentacles of sea anemones bristle with tiny harpoons (nematocysts) primed with toxins, and are an effective deterrent against most predators. However, saddle butterflyfish, which are up to 30 cm (12 in) long, have developed a resistance to these toxins. Saddle butterflyfish usually flutter gently rather than swim. However, in the presence of their preferred food, sea anemones, this gentleness disappears, and the butterflyfish dash in and out, ripping off the anemone tentacles.

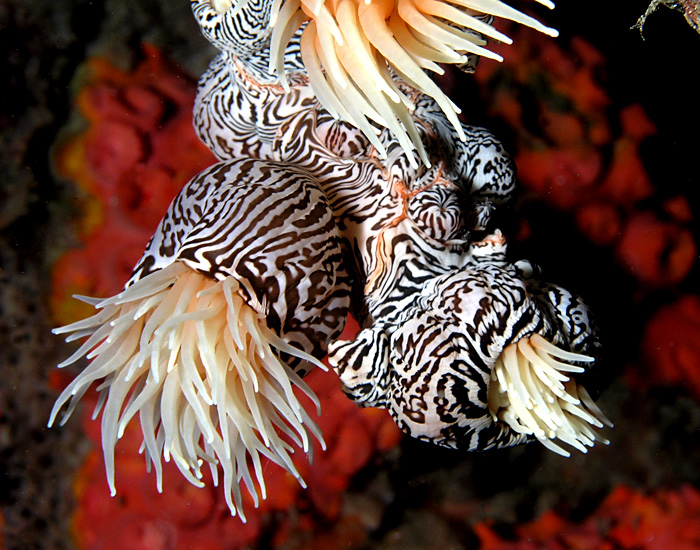
The tentacles of sea anemones bristle with tiny toxic harpoons.

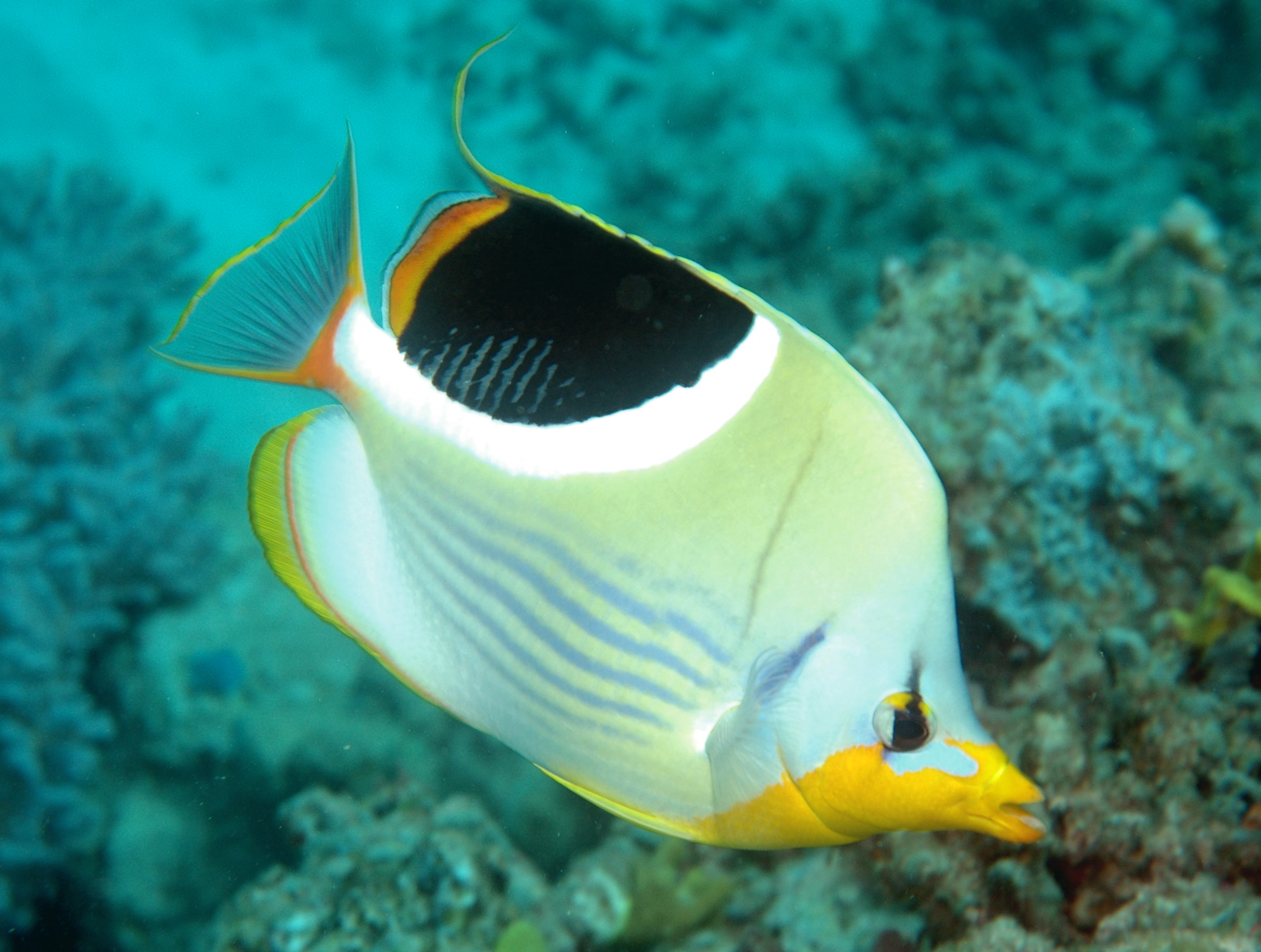
Saddle butterflyfish are resistant to the sea anemone toxin.

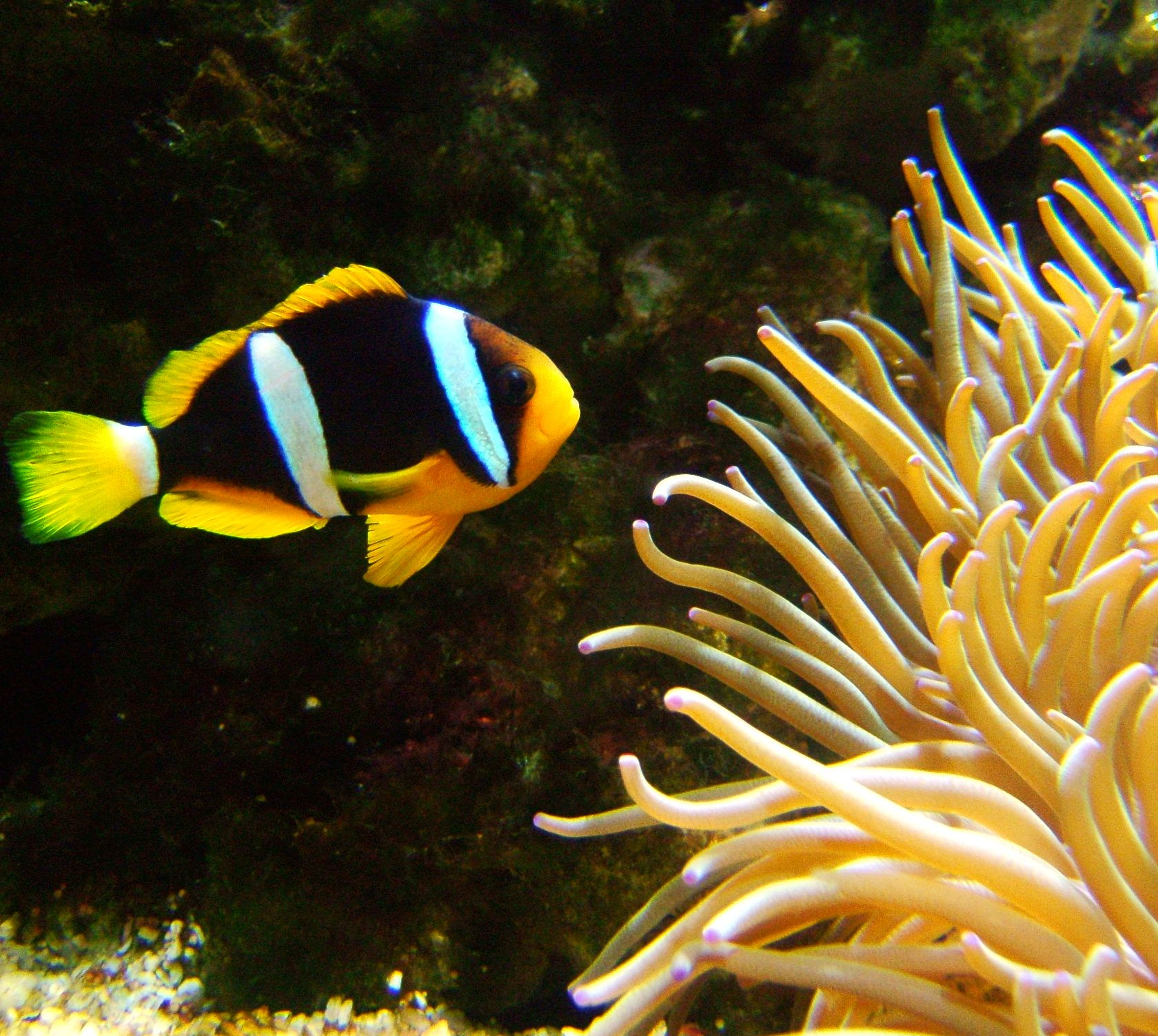
Yellowtail clownfish with sea anemone

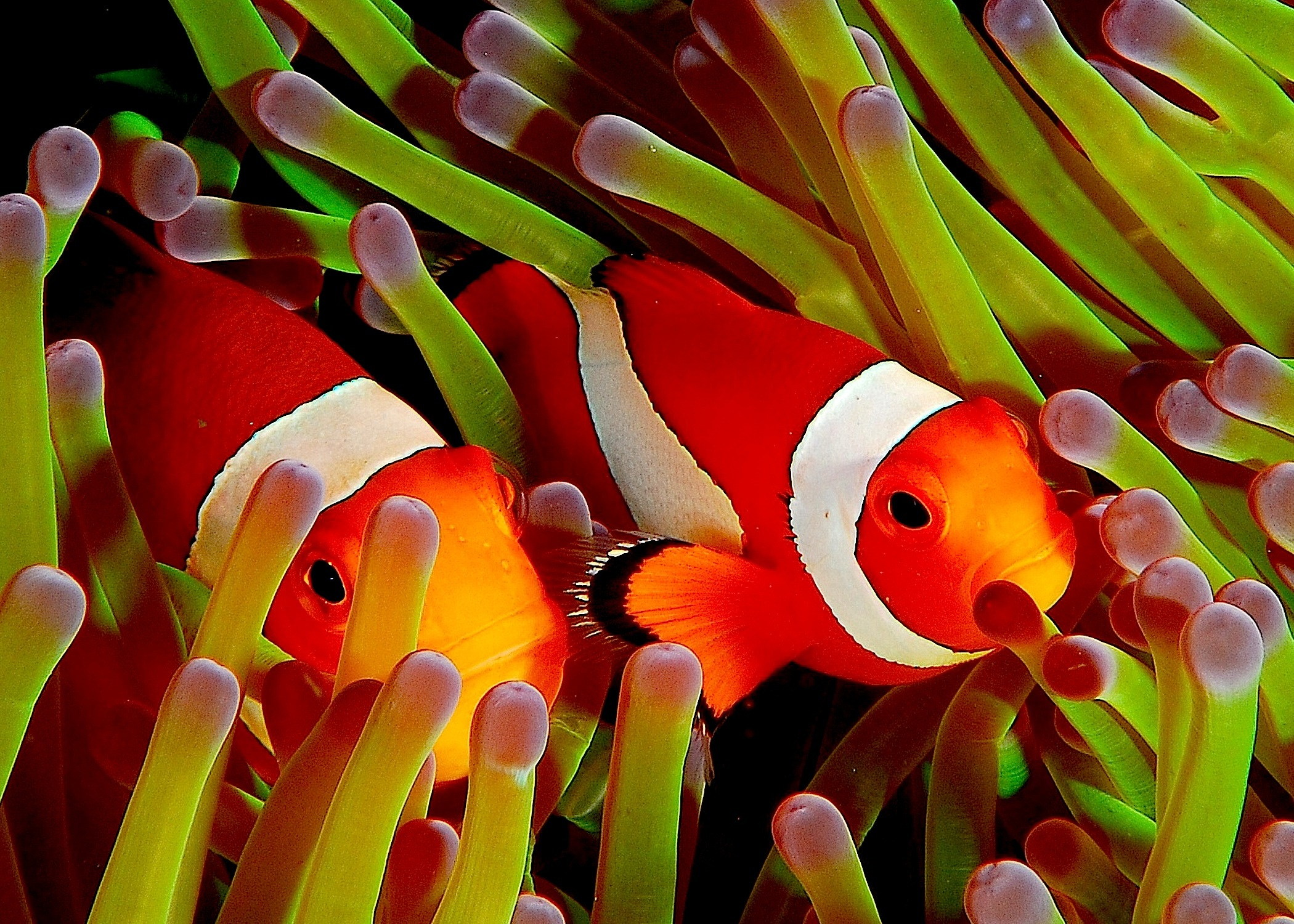
Common clownfish guarding their sea anemone home

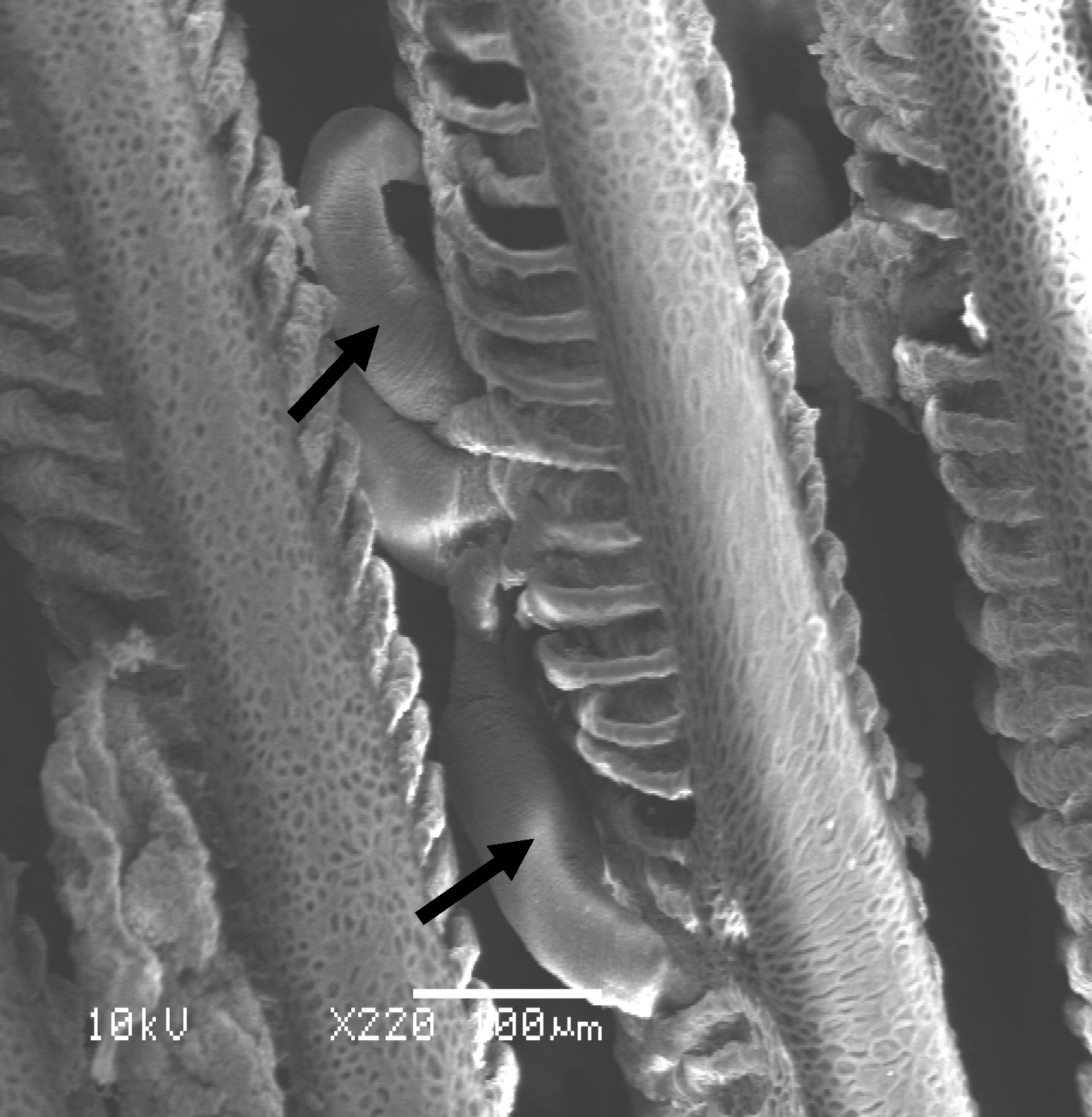
Monogenean parasites of the genus Pseudorhabdosynochus (arrows) on the gill filament of a grouper.

There is a mutualistic relationship between sea anemones and clownfish. This gives the sea anemones a second line of defence. They are guarded by fiercely territorial clownfish, who are also immune to the anemone toxins. To get their meal, butterflyfish must get past these protective clownfish who, although smaller, are not intimidated. An anemone without its clownfish will quickly be eaten by butterflyfish. In return, the anemones provide the clownfish protection from their predators, who are not immune to anemone stings. As a further benefit to the anemone, waste ammonia from the clownfish feed symbiotic algae found in the anemone's tentacles.

As with all fish, coral reef fish harbour parasites. Since coral reef fish are characterized by high biodiversity, parasites of coral reef fish show tremendous variety. Parasites of coral reef fish include nematodes, Platyhelminthes (cestodes, digeneans, and monogeneans), leeches, parasitic crustaceans such as isopods and copepods, and various microorganisms such as myxosporidia and microsporidia. Some of these fish parasites have heteroxenous life cycles (i.e. they have several hosts) among which sharks (certain cestodes) or molluscs (digeneans). The high biodiversity of coral reefs increases the complexity of the interactions between parasites and their various and numerous hosts. Numerical estimates of parasite biodiversity have shown that certain coral fish species have up to 30 species of parasites. The mean number of parasites per fish species is about ten. This has a consequence in term of co-extinction. Results obtained for the coral reef fish of New Caledonia suggest that extinction of a coral reef fish species of average size would eventually result in the co-extinction of at least ten species of parasites.

== Toxicity ==
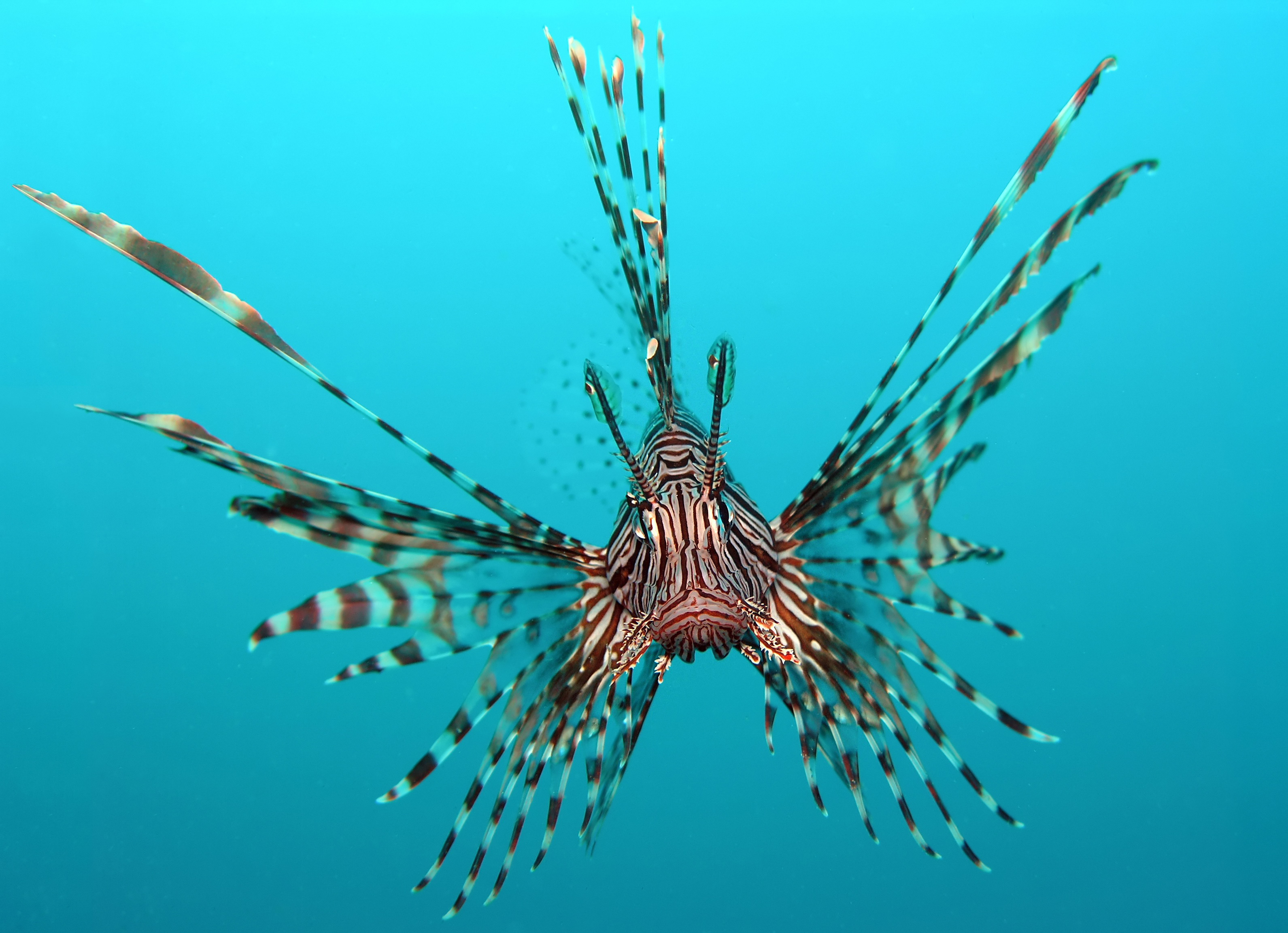
Head-on view of the venomous lionfish

Many reef fish are toxic. Toxic fish are fish which contain strong toxins in their bodies. There is a distinction between poisonous fish and venomous fish. Both types of fish contain strong toxins, but the difference is in the way the toxin is delivered. Venomous fish deliver their toxins (called venom) by biting, stinging, or stabbing, causing an envenomation. Venomous fish do not necessarily cause poisoning if they are eaten, since the venom is often destroyed in the digestive system. By contrast, poisonous fish contain strong toxins which are not destroyed by the digestive system. This makes them poisonous to eat.

Venomous fish carry their venom in venom glands and use various delivery systems, such as spines or sharp fins, barbs or spikes, and fangs. Venomous fish tend to be either very visible, using flamboyant colours to warn enemies, or skilfully camouflaged and maybe buried in the sand. Apart from the defence or hunting value, venom might have value for bottom dwelling fish by killing the bacteria that try to invade their skin. Few of these venoms have been studied. They are a yet to be tapped resource for bioprospecting to find drugs with medical uses.

The most venomous known fish is the reef stonefish. It has a remarkable ability to camouflage itself amongst rocks. It is an ambush predator that sits on the bottom waiting for prey to come close. It does not swim away if disturbed, but erects 13 venomous spines along its back. For defence, it can shoot venom from each or all of these spines. Each spine is like a hypodermic needle, delivering the venom from two sacs attached to the spine. The stonefish has control over whether to shoot its venom, and does so when provoked or frightened. The venom results in severe pain, paralysis and tissue death, and can be fatal if not treated. Despite its formidable defence, the stonefish does have predators. Some bottom feeding rays and sharks with crushing teeth feed on them, as does the Stokes' seasnake

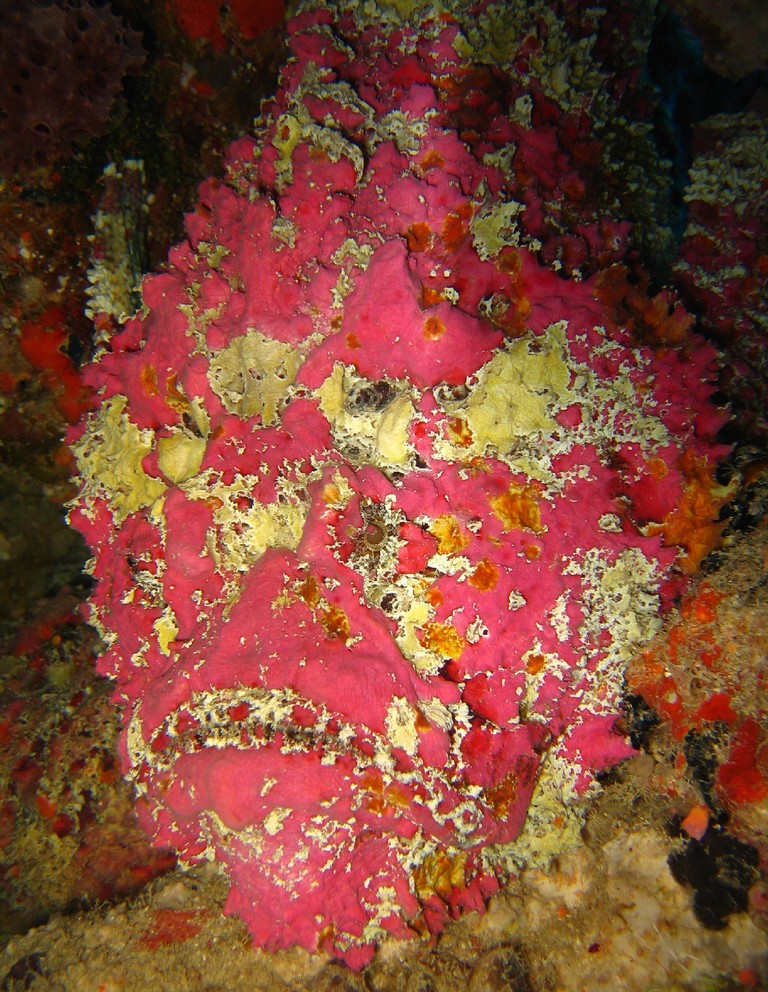
The most venomous known fish is the reef stonefish.

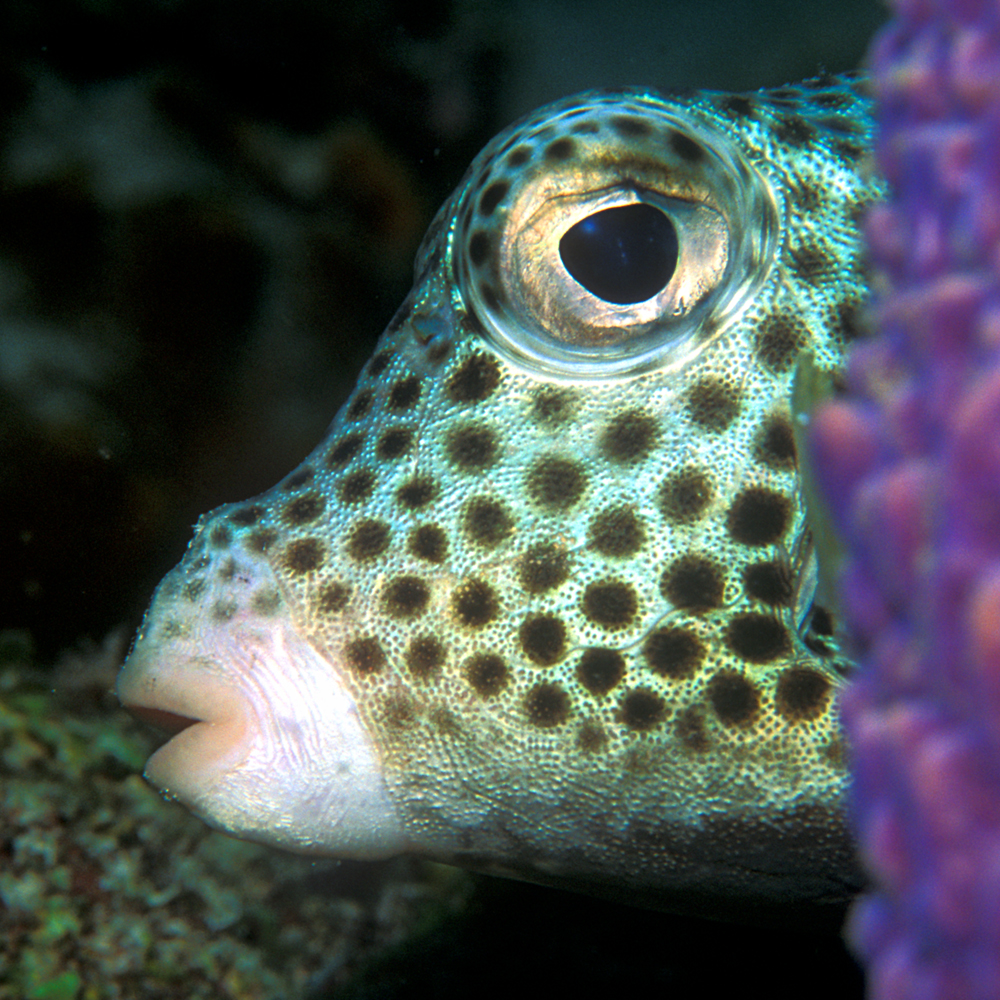
The spotted trunkfish secretes a ciguatera toxin from glands on its skin.

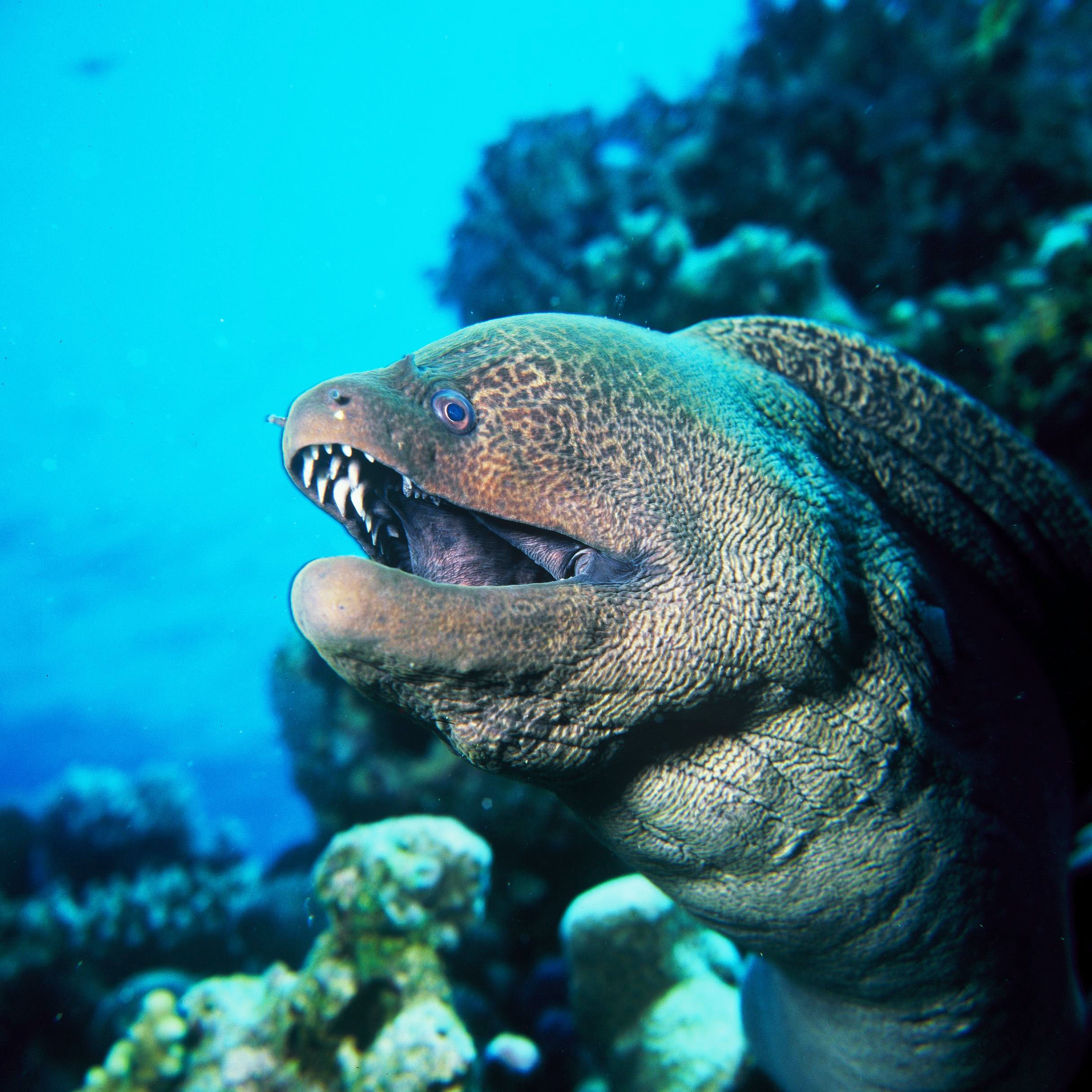
Like many other apex reef fish, the giant moray can cause ciguatera poisoning if eaten.

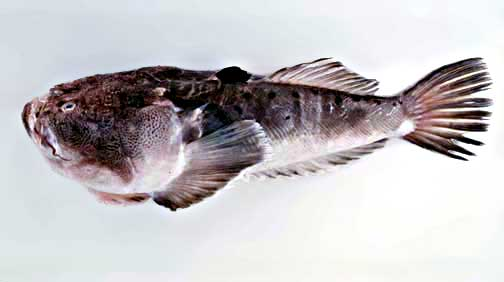
The stargazer buries itself in sand and can deliver electric shocks as well as venom.

Unlike the stonefish which can shoot venom, the lionfish can only release venom when something strikes its spines. Although not native to the US coast, lionfish have appeared around Florida and have spread up the coast to New York. They are attractive aquarium fish, sometimes used to stock ponds, and may have been washed into the sea during a hurricane. Lionfish can aggressively dart at scuba divers and attempt to puncture the facemask with their venomous spines.

The spotted trunkfish is a reef fish which secretes a colourless ciguatera toxin from glands on its skin when touched. The toxin is only dangerous when ingested, so there's no immediate harm to divers. However, predators as large as nurse sharks can die as a result of eating a trunkfish. Ciguatera toxins appear to accumulate in top predators of coral reefs. Many of the Caribbean groupers and the barracuda for example may contain enough of this toxin to cause severe symptoms in humans who eat them. What makes the situation particularly dangerous is that such species may be toxic only at certain sizes or locations, making it difficult to know whether or when they are or are not safe to eat. In some locations this leads to many cases of ciguatera poisoning among tropical islanders.

The stargazer buries itself in sand and can deliver electric shocks as well as venom. It is a delicacy in some cultures (the venom is destroyed when it is cooked), and can be found for sale in some fish markets with the electric organ removed. They have been called "the meanest things in creation".

The giant moray is a reef fish at the top of the food chain. Like many other apex reef fish, it is likely to cause ciguatera poisoning if eaten. Outbreaks of ciguatera poisoning in the 11th to 15th centuries from large, carnivorous reef fish, caused by harmful algal blooms, could be a reason why Polynesians migrated to Easter Island, New Zealand, and possibly Hawaii.

== Reef sharks and rays ==
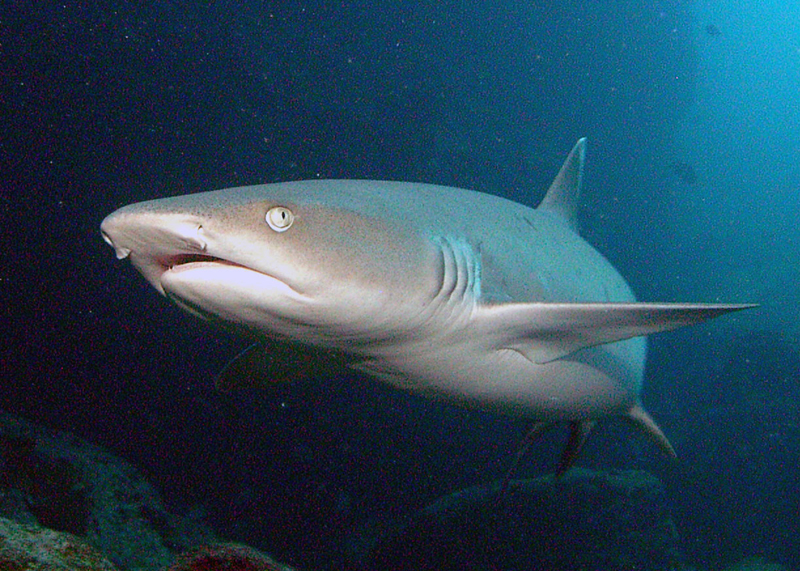
The whitetip reef shark almost exclusively inhabits coral reefs.

Whitetip, blacktip and grey reef sharks dominate the ecosystems of coral reefs in the Indo-Pacific. Coral reefs in the western Atlantic Ocean are dominated by the Caribbean reef shark. These sharks, all species of requiem shark, all have the robust, streamlined bodies typical of the requiem shark. As fast-swimming, agile predators, they feed primarily on free-swimming bony fishes and cephalopods. Other species of reef sharks include the Galapagos shark, the tawny nurse shark and hammerheads.

The whitetip reef shark is a small shark usually less than 1.6 m (5.2 ft) in length. It is found almost exclusively around coral reefs where it can be encountered around coral heads and ledges with high vertical relief, or over sandy flats, in lagoons, or near drop-offs to deeper water. Whitetips prefer very clear water and rarely swim far from the bottom. They spend most of the daytime resting inside caves. Unlike other requiem sharks, which usually rely on ram ventilation and must constantly swim to breathe, these sharks can pump water over their gills and lie still on the bottom. They have slender, lithe bodies, which allow them to wriggle into crevices and holes and extract prey inaccessible to other reef sharks. On the other hand, they are rather clumsy when attempting to take food suspended in open water.

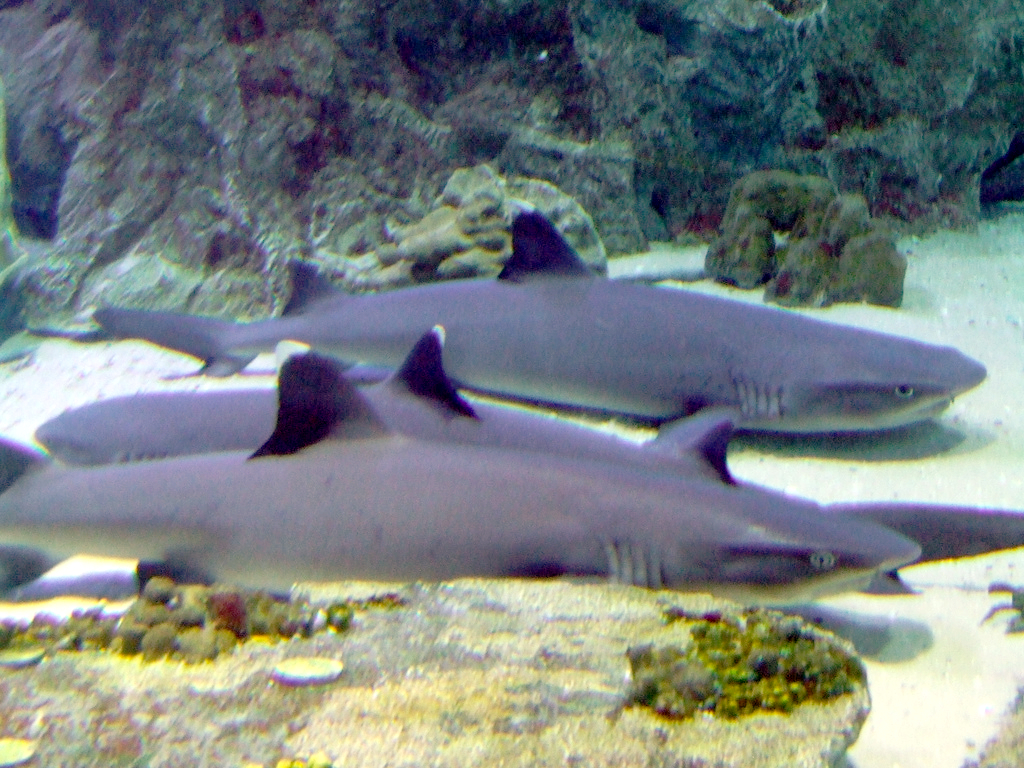
Whitetip reef sharks spend much of the day lying still on the bottom.

Whitetip reef sharks do not frequent very shallow water like the blacktip reef shark, nor the outer reef like the grey reef shark. They generally remain within a highly localized area. An individual shark may use the same cave for months to years. The daytime home range of a whitetip reef shark is limited to about 0.05 km^{2} (0.019 mi^{2}); at night this range increases to 1 km^{2} (0.39 mi^{2}).

The whitetip reef shark is highly responsive to olfactory, acoustic, and electrical cues given off by potential prey. Its visual system is attuned more to movement and/or contrast than to object details. It is especially sensitive to natural and artificial low-frequency sounds in the 25–100 Hz range, which evoke struggling fish. Whitetips hunt primarily at night, when many fishes are asleep and easily taken. After dusk, a group of sharks may target the same prey item, covering every exit route from a particular coral head. Each shark hunts for itself and in competition with the others in its group. They feed mainly on bony fishes, including eels, squirrelfishes, snappers, damselfishes, parrotfishes, surgeonfishes, triggerfishes, and goatfishes, as well as octopus, spiny lobsters, and crabs. Important predators of the whitetip reef shark include tiger sharks and Galapagos sharks.

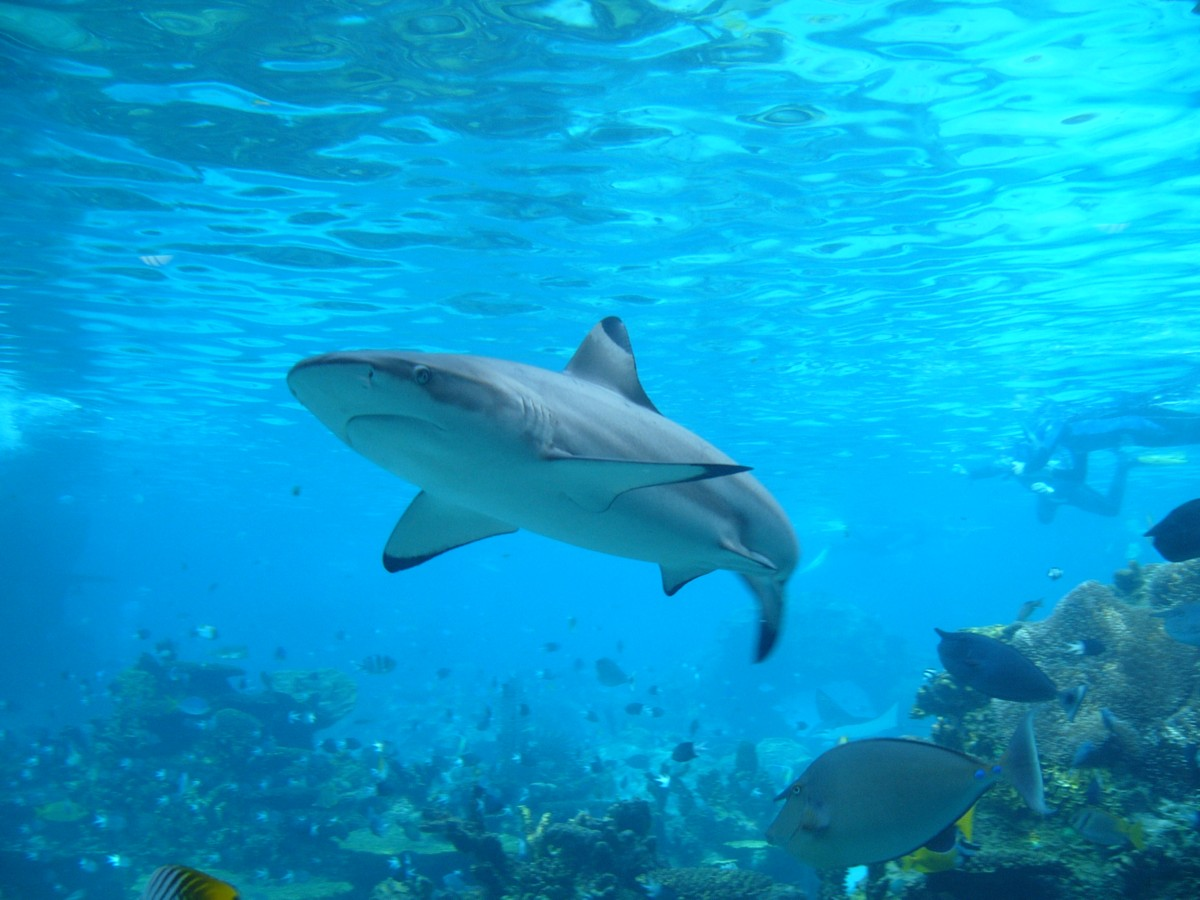
Adult blacktip reef sharks often patrol reef ledges.

The blacktip reef shark is typically about 1.6 m (5.2 ft) long. It is usually found over reef ledges and sandy flats, though it can also enter brackish and freshwater environments. This species likes shallow water, while the whitetip and the grey reef shark are prefer deeper water. Younger sharks favour shallow sandy flats, and older sharks spend more time around reef ledges and near reef drop-offs. Blacktip reef sharks are strongly attached to their own area, where they may remain for up to several years. A tracking study off Palmyra Atoll in the central Pacific has found that the blacktip reef shark had a home range of about 0.55 km^{2} (0.21 mi^{2}), among the smallest of any shark species. The size and location of the range does not change with time of day. The blacktip reef shark swims alone or in small groups. Large social aggregations have also been observed. They are active predators of small bony fishes, cephalopods, and crustaceans, and also feed on sea snakes and seabirds. Blacktip reef sharks are preyed on by groupers, grey reef sharks, tiger sharks, and members of their own species. At Palmyra Atoll, adult blacktip reef sharks avoid patrolling tiger sharks by staying out of the central, deeper lagoon.

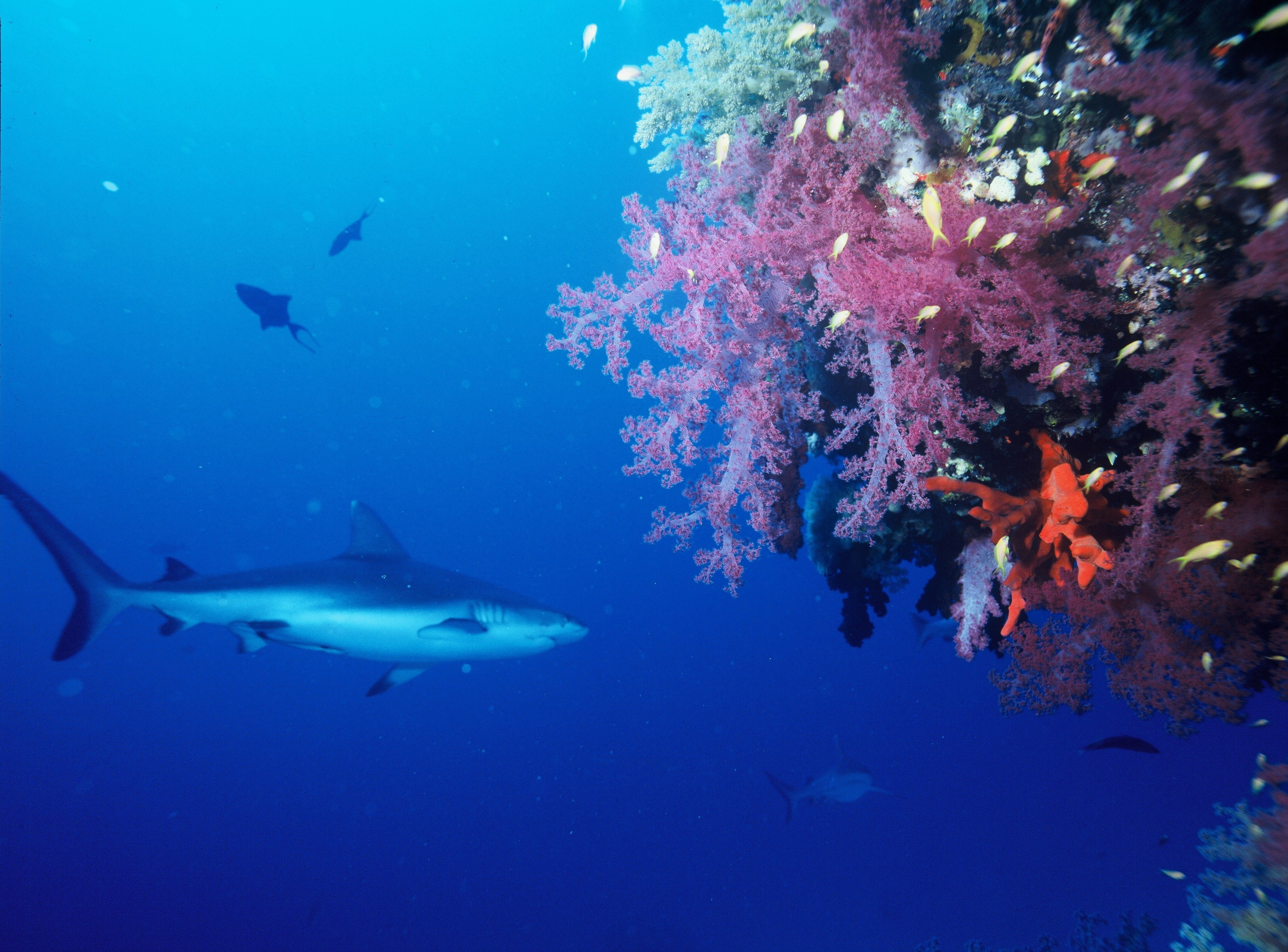
Coral reef drop-offs are a favoured habitat for grey reef sharks.

Grey reef sharks are usually less than 1.9 metres (6.2 ft) long. Despite their moderate size, grey reef sharks actively expel most other shark species from favored habitats. In areas where this species co-exists with the blacktip reef shark, the latter species occupy the shallow flats while the grey reef sharks stay in deeper water. Many grey reef sharks have a home range on a specific area of the reef, to which they continually return. However, they are social rather than territorial. During the day, these sharks often form groups of 5–20 individuals near coral-reef drop-offs, splitting up in the evening as the sharks begin to hunt. They are found over continental and insular shelves, preferring the leeward (away from the direction of the current) sides of coral reefs with clear water and rugged topography. They are frequently found near the drop-offs at the outer edges of the reef, and less commonly within lagoons. On occasion, this shark may venture several kilometers out into the open ocean.

Shark researcher Leonard Compagno comments on the relationship between the three species:

[The grey reef shark] ...shows microhabitat separation from the blacktip reef sharks; around islands where both species occur, the blacktip occupies shallow flats, while the grey reef shark is usually found in deeper areas, but where the blacktip is absent, the grey reef shark is commonly found on the flats... [The grey reef shark] complements the whitetip shark as it is far more adapt at catching off-bottom fish than the whitetip, but the later is far more competent in extracting prey from crevices and holes in reefs.

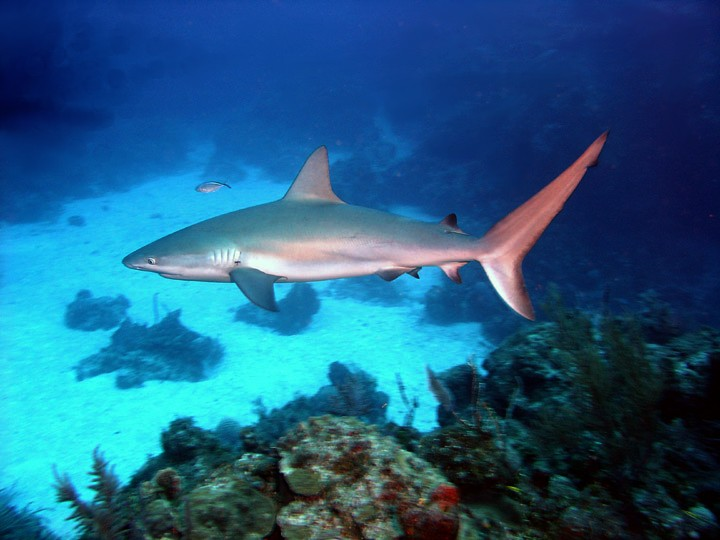
A Caribbean reef shark cruises a coral reef in the Bahamas.

The Caribbean reef shark is up to 3 metres (10 ft) long, one of the largest apex predators in the reef ecosystem. Like the whitetip reef shark, they have been documented resting motionless on the sea bottom or inside caves - unusual behaviour for requiem sharks. Caribbean reef sharks play a major role in shaping Caribbean reef communities. They are more active at night, with no evidence of seasonal changes in activity or migration. Juveniles tend to remain in a localized area throughout the year, while adults range over a wider area. The Caribbean reef shark feeds on a wide variety of reef-dwelling bony fishes and cephalopods, as well as some elasmobranchs such as eagle rays and yellow stingrays . Young sharks feed on small fishes, shrimps, and crabs. In turn, young sharks are preyed on by larger sharks such as the tiger shark and the bull shark.

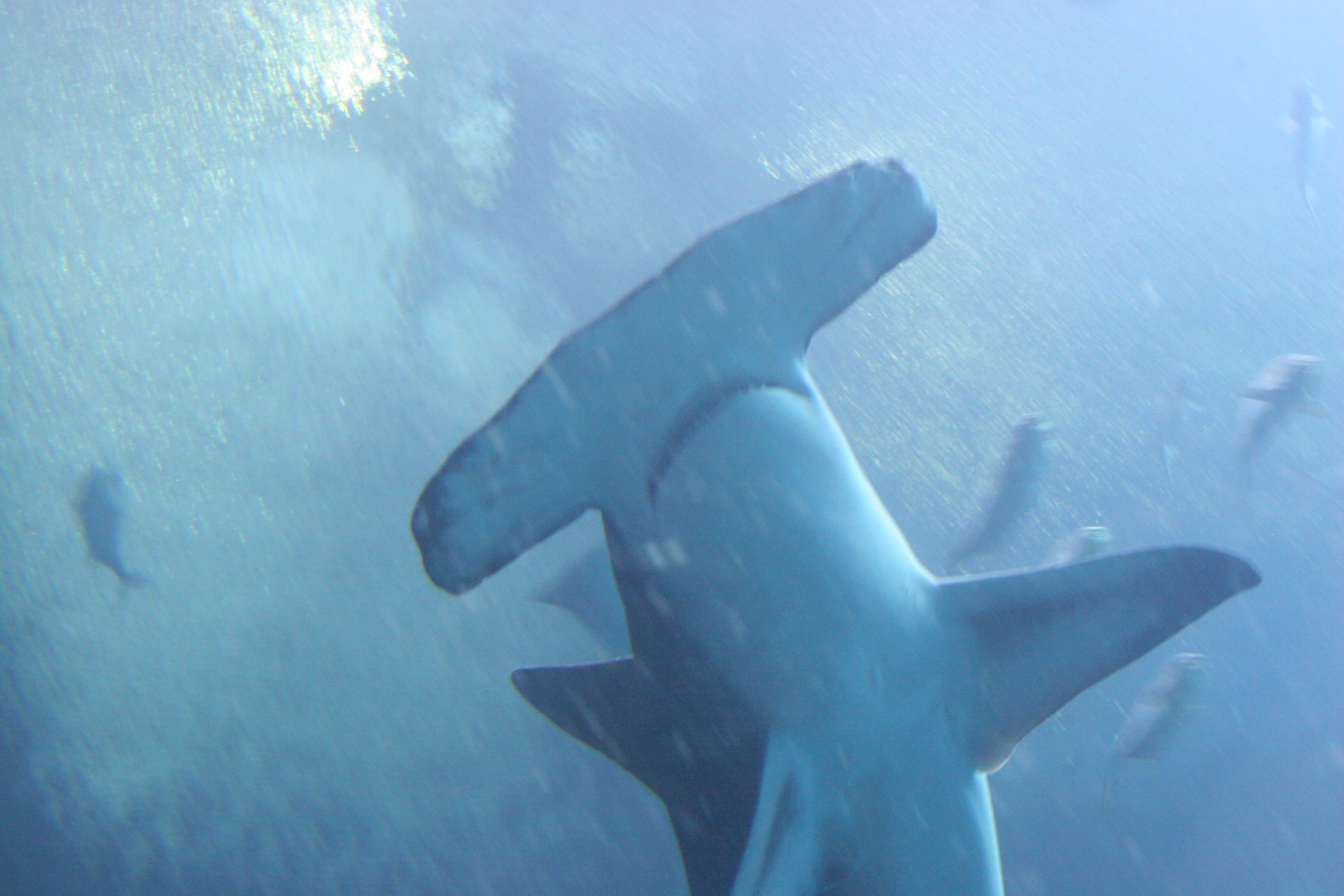
The great hammerhead uses its hammer both to locate electrical signatures of stingrays buried in the sand and to pin them down.

== See also ==
- Anthiinae
- List of marine aquarium fish species – most of these fish are coral reef fish
- List of reef fish of the Red Sea
