= Diversity of fish =

Fish species categorized by various characteristics

External image
- World's shortest lived fish

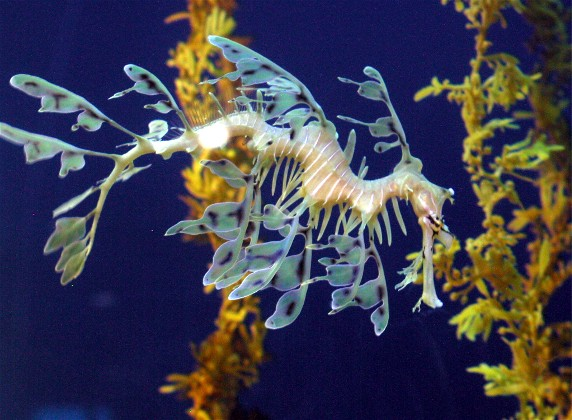
Fish come in many shapes and sizes. This is a sea dragon, a close relative of the seahorse. They are camouflaged to look like floating seaweed.

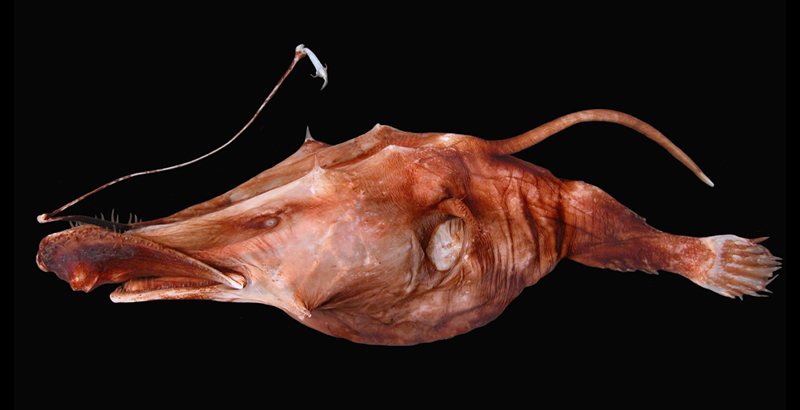
The deep sea Lasiognathus amphirhamphus is a rare ambush predator known only from a single female specimen (pictured). It is an angler fish that "angles" for its prey with a lure attached to a line from its head.

Fish are very diverse animals and can be categorised in many ways. Although most fish species have probably been discovered and described, about 250 new ones are still discovered every year. According to FishBase, about 34,800 species of fish had been described as of February 2022, which is more than the combined total of all other vertebrates: mammals, amphibians, reptiles and birds.

Fish species are is divided roughly equally between marine (oceanic) and freshwater ecosystems. Coral reefs in the Indo-Pacific region constitute the center of diversity for marine fishes, whereas continental freshwater fishes are most diverse in large river basins of tropical rainforests, especially the Amazon, Congo, and Mekong basins. More than 5,600 fish species inhabit Neotropical freshwaters alone, such that Neotropical fishes represent about 10% of all vertebrate species on the Earth. Exceptionally rich sites in the Amazon basin, such as Cantão State Park, can contain more freshwater fish species than occur in all of Europe.

== By taxonomy ==
Fish systematics is the formal description and organisation of fish taxa into systems. It is complex and still evolving. Controversies over "arcane, but important, details of classification are still quietly raging".

The term "fish" describes any non-tetrapod chordate, (i.e., an animal with a backbone), that has gills throughout life and has limbs, if any, in the shape of fins. Unlike groupings such as birds or mammals, fish are paraphyletic, since the tetrapod clade is within the clade of lobe-finned fishes.

=== Jawless fish ===
Jawless fish were the earliest fish to evolve. There is current debate over whether these are really fish at all. They have no jaw, no scales, no paired fins, and no bony skeleton. Their skin is smooth and soft to the touch, and they are very flexible. Instead of a jaw, they possess an oral sucker. They use this to fasten onto other fish, and then use their rasp-like teeth to grind through their host's skin into the viscera. Jawless fish inhabit both fresh and salt water environments. Some are anadromous, moving between both fresh and salt water habitats.

Extant jawless fish are either lamprey or hagfish. Juvenile lamprey feed by sucking up mud containing micro-organisms and organic debris. The lamprey has well-developed eyes, while the hagfish has only primitive eyespots. The hagfish coats itself and carcasses it finds with noxious slime to deter predators, and periodically ties itself into a knot to scrape the slime off. It is the only invertebrate fish and the only animal which has a skull but no vertebral column.

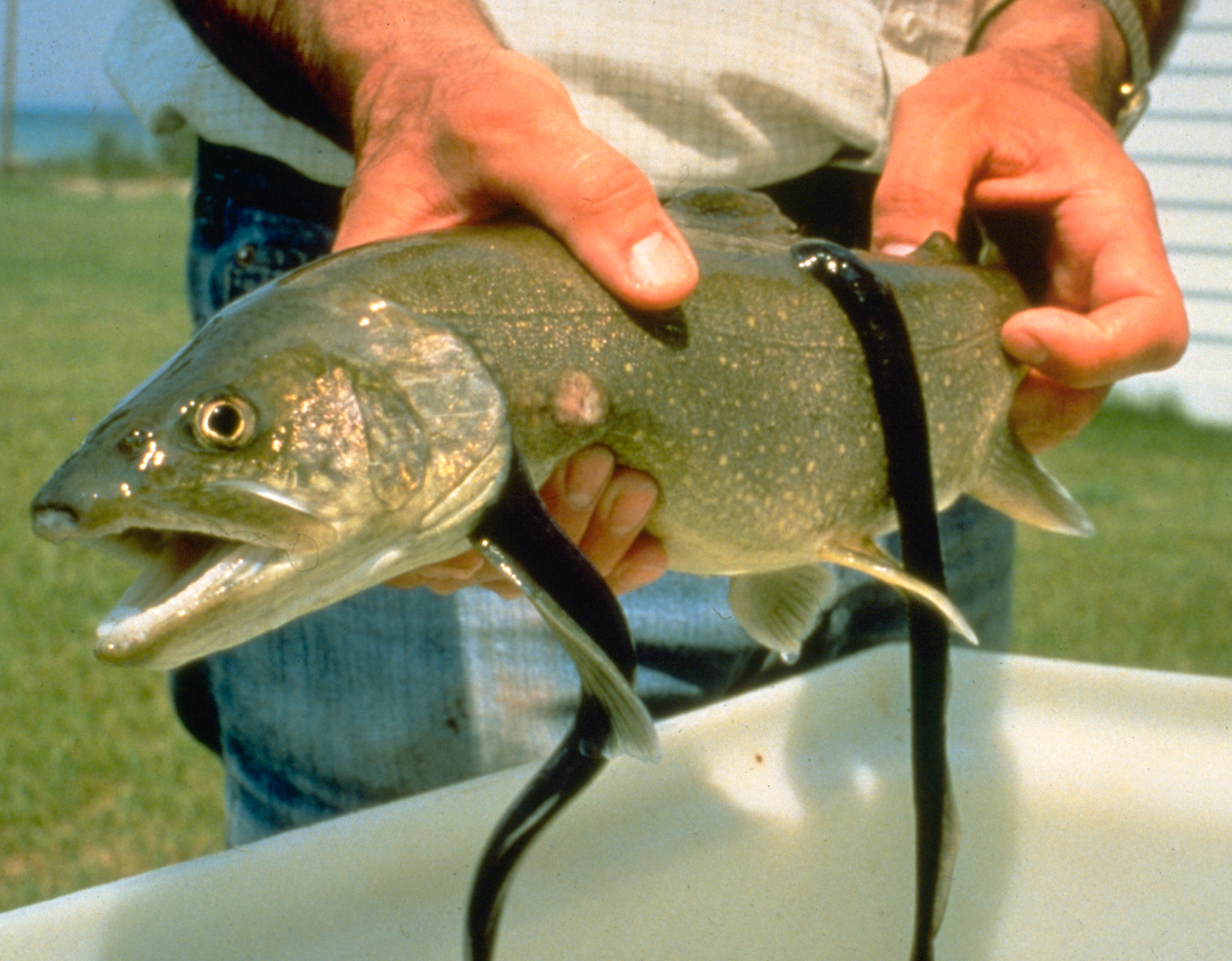
Lampreys attached to a lake trout

Mouth of a sea lamprey

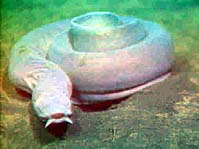
Pacific hagfish resting on bottom at 280 m

=== Cartilaginous fish ===
Cartilaginous fish have a cartilaginous skeleton. However, their ancestors were bony animals, and were the first fish to develop paired fins. Cartilaginous fish don't have swim bladders. Their skin is covered in placoid scales (dermal denticles) that are as rough as sandpaper. Because cartilaginous fish do not have bone marrow, the spleen and special tissue around the gonads produces red blood cells. Their tails can be asymmetric, with the upper lobe longer than the lower lobe. Some cartilaginous fishes possess an organ called a Leydig's organ which also produces red blood cells.

There are over 980 species of cartilaginous fish. They include sharks, rays and chimaera.

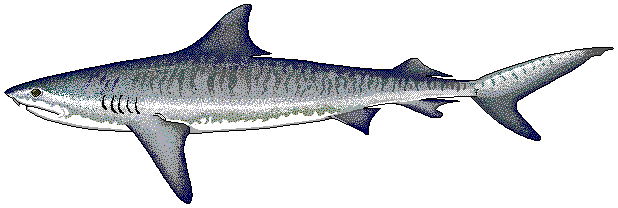
Tiger shark

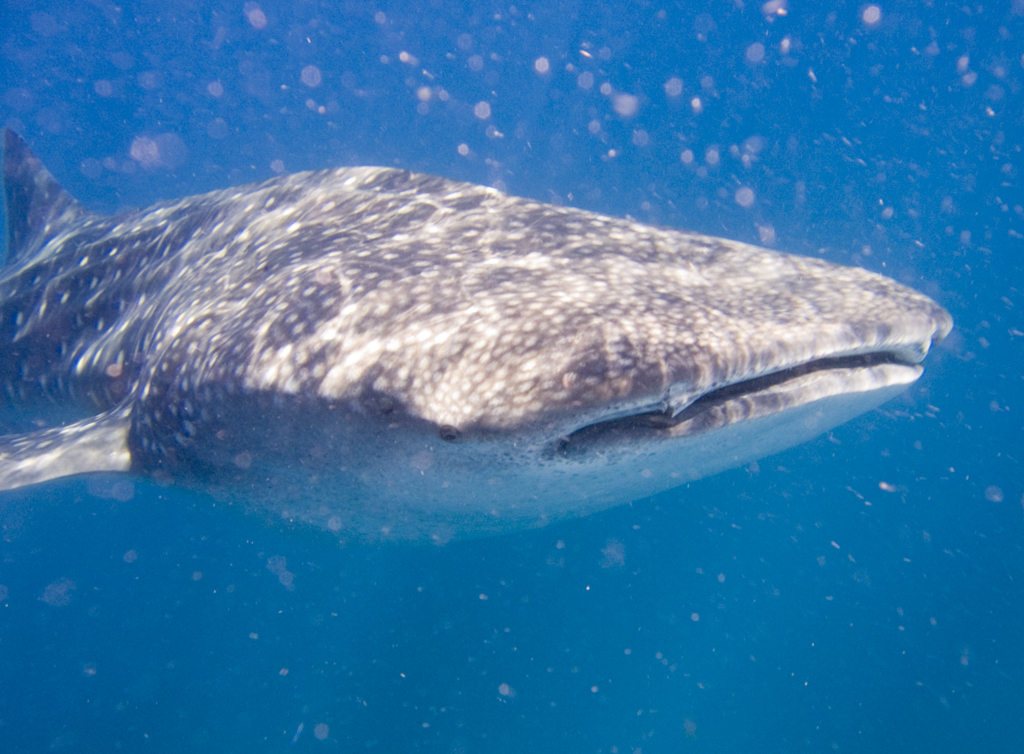
Whale shark

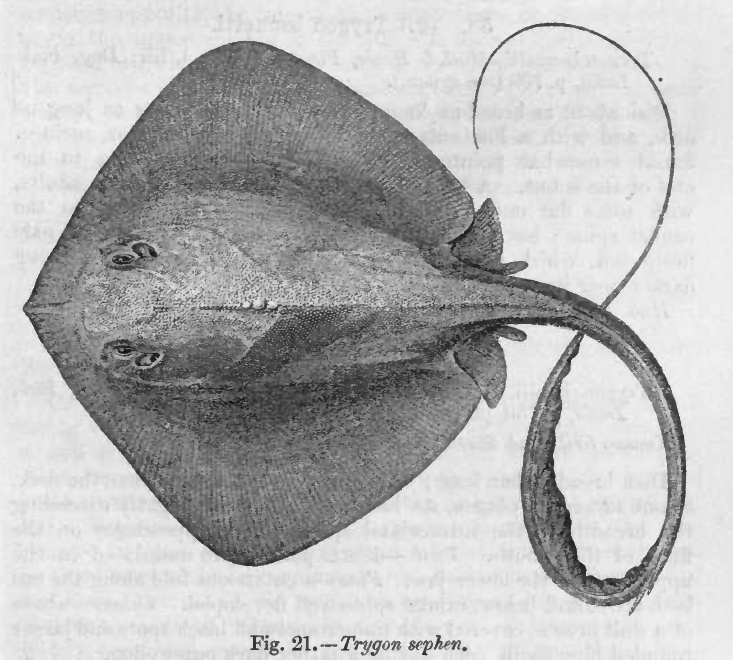
Stingray

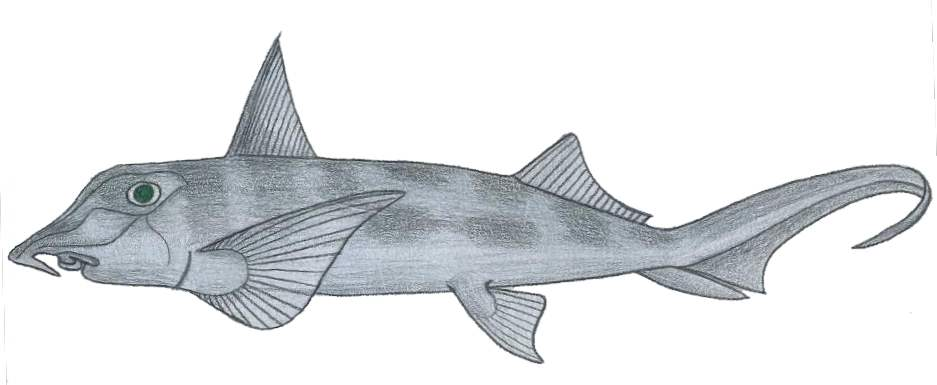
This elephant fish is a chimaera

=== Bony fish ===
Bony fish include the lobe-finned fish and the ray finned fish. The lobe-finned fish is the class of fleshy finned fishes, consisting of lungfish and coelacanths. They are bony fish with fleshy, lobed paired fins, which are joined to the body by a single bone. These fins evolved into the legs of the first tetrapod land vertebrates, amphibians. Ray finned fishes are so-called because they possess lepidotrichia or "fin rays", their fins being webs of skin supported by bony or horny spines ("rays").

There are three types of ray finned fishes: the chondrosteans, holosteans, and teleosts. The chondrosteans and holosteans are among the earlier fish to evolve, and share characteristics with both teleosts and sharks. In comparison with the other chondrosteans, the holosteans are closer to the teleosts and further from sharks.

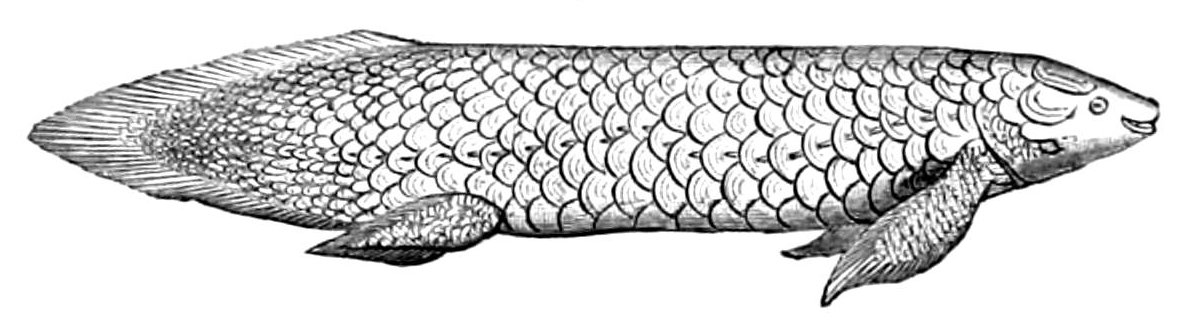
Lungfish can breathe in air as well as water

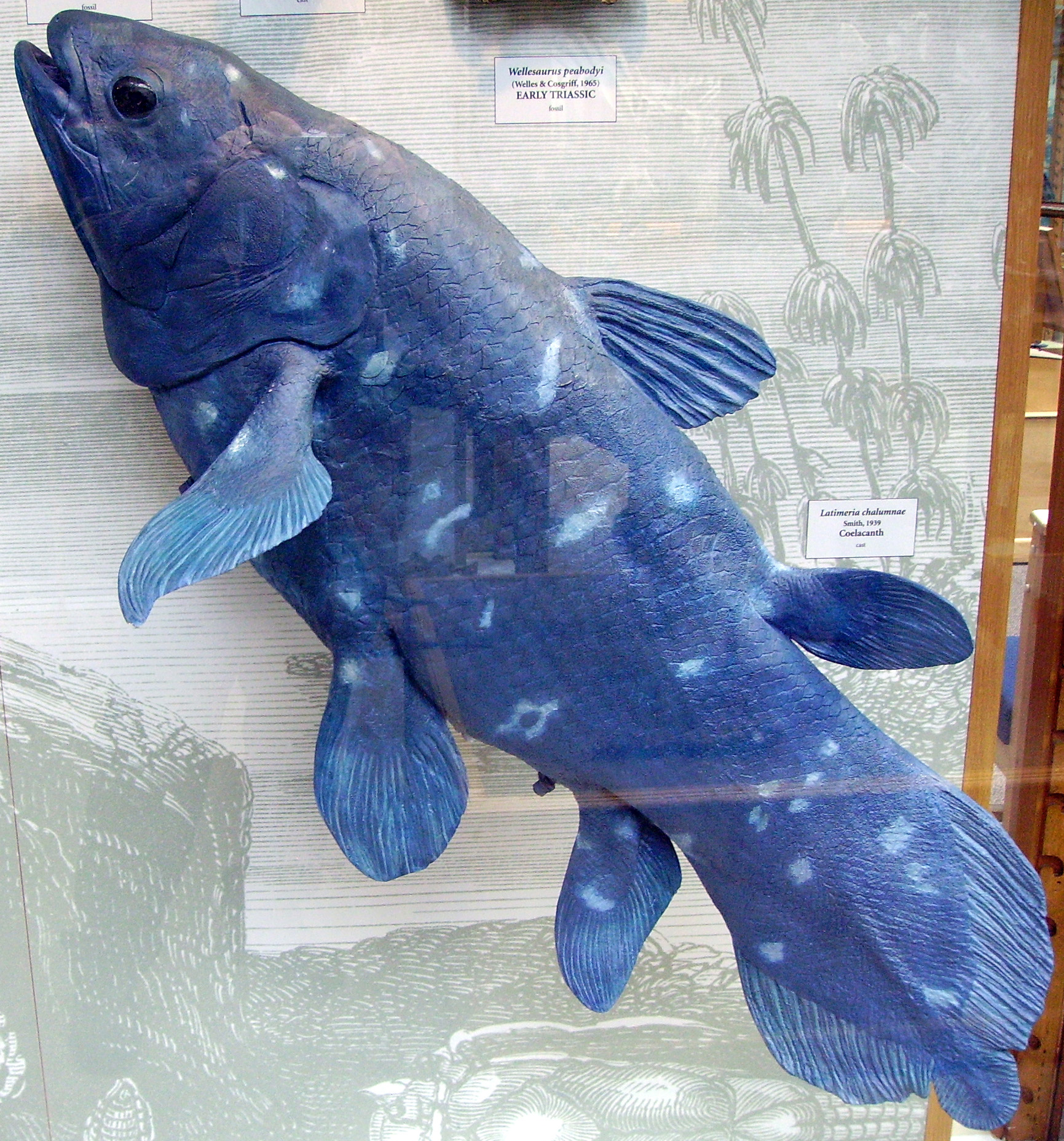
Model of a coelacanth, thought until 1938 to be extinct. They are deep blue.

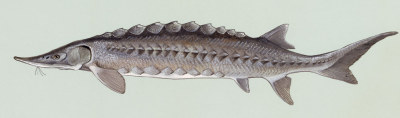
This Atlantic sturgeon is a chondrostean

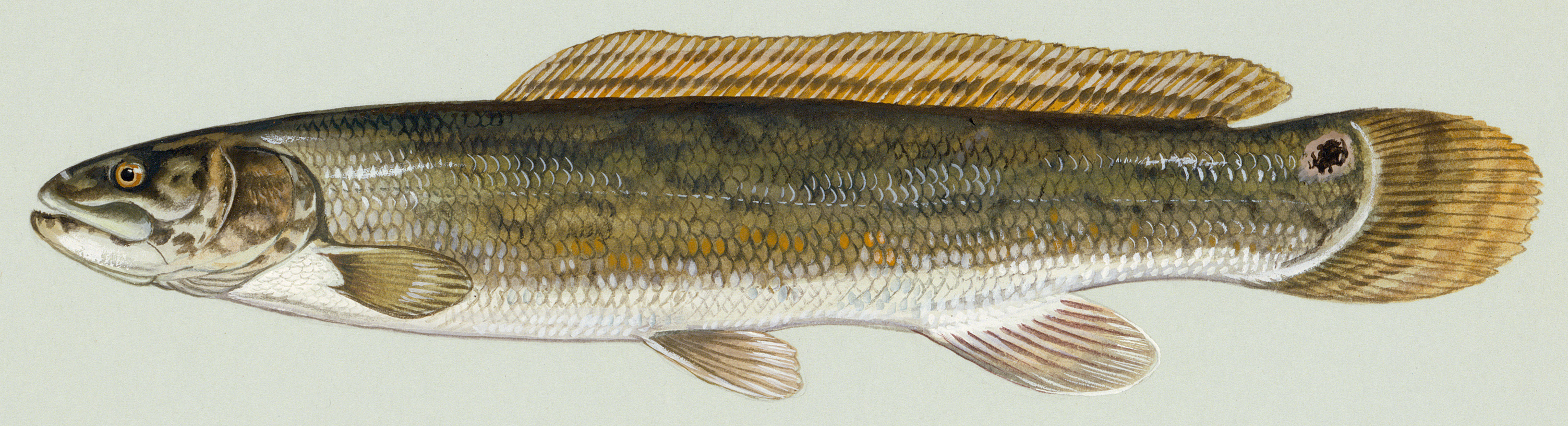
This bowfin is a holostean

==== Teleosts ====
Teleosts are the most advanced or "modern" fishes. They are overwhelmingly the dominant class of fishes (or, for that matter, of vertebrates), with nearly 30,000 species, covering about 96 percent of all extant fish species. They are ubiquitous throughout freshwater and marine environments, from the deep sea to the highest mountain streams. Included are nearly all the important commercial and recreational fishes.

Teleosts have a movable maxilla and premaxilla and corresponding modifications in the jaw musculature. These modifications make it possible for teleosts to protrude their jaws outwards from the mouth. The caudal fin is homocercal, meaning the upper and lower lobes are about equal in size. The spine ends at the caudal peduncle, distinguishing this group from those in which the spine extends into the upper lobe of the caudal fin.

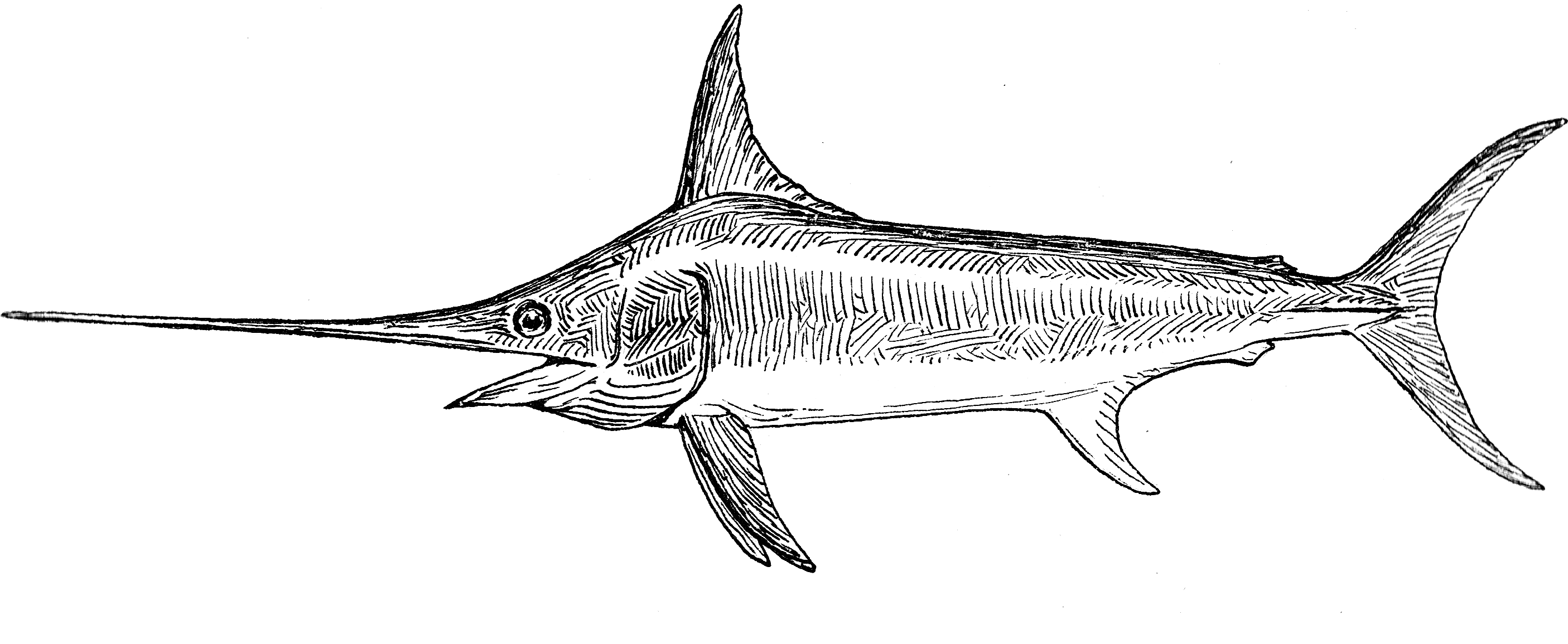
Swordfish are teleosts

Rose fish are also teleosts

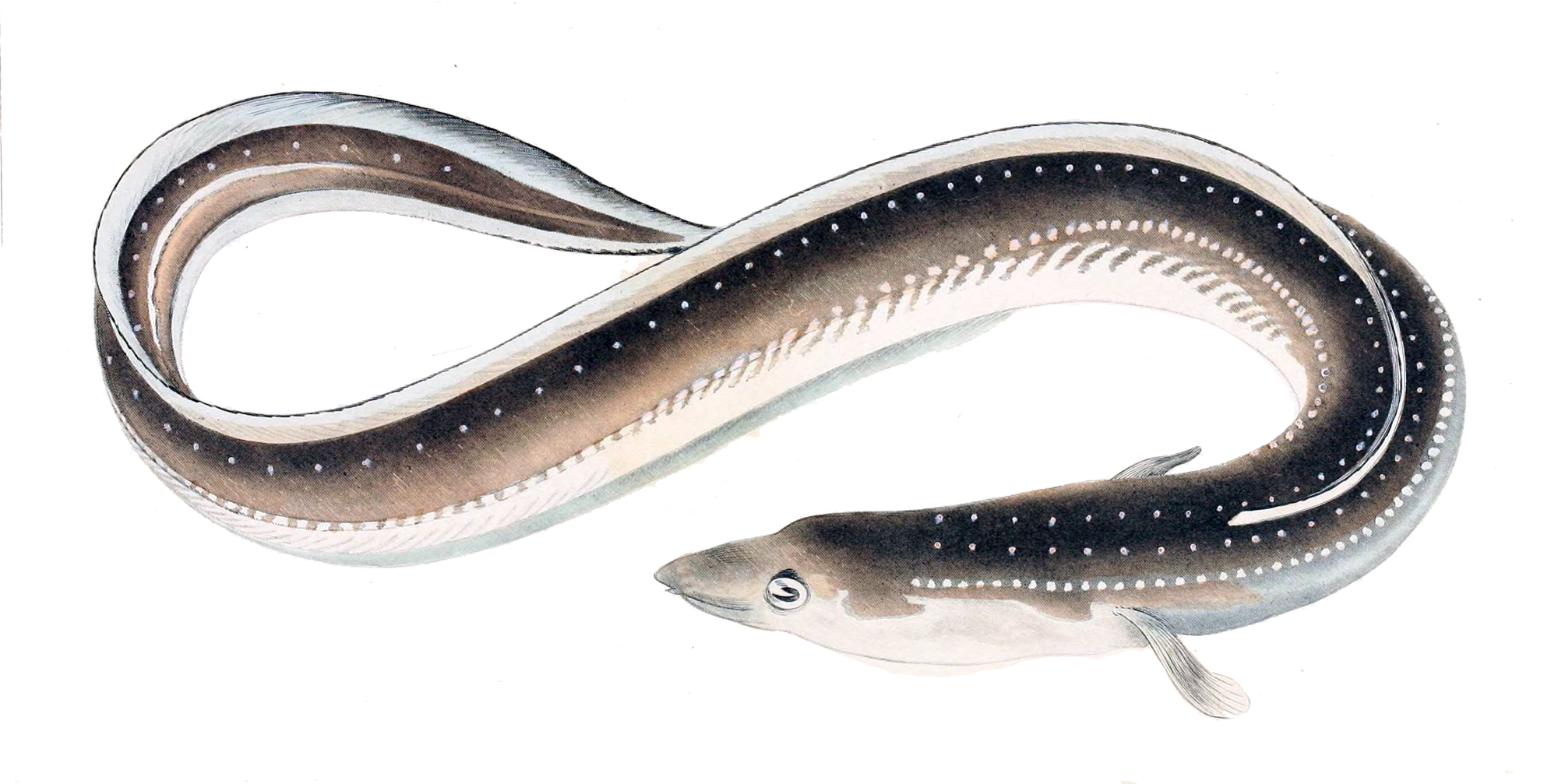
Eels are teleosts too

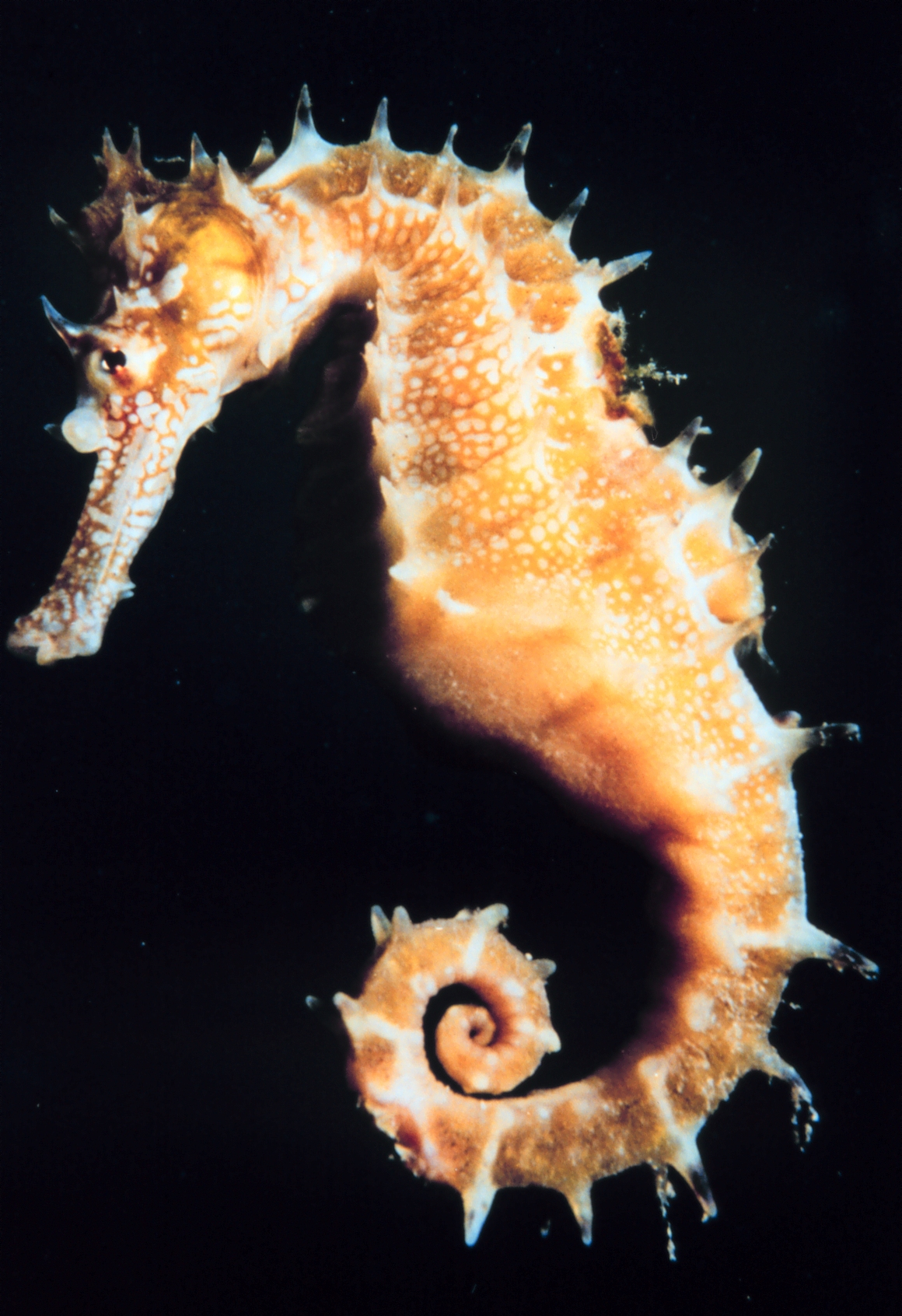
So are seahorses

== By habitat ==
There is 10,000 times as much saltwater in the oceans as there is freshwater in the lakes and rivers. However, only 58 percent of extant fish species live in saltwater. A disproportionate 41 percent are freshwater fish (the remaining one per cent are anadromous). This diversity in freshwater species is perhaps not surprising, since the thousands of separate lake habitats promote speciation.

Habitat	Area	Volume	Depth	Species		Fish biomass
	million km^{2}	million cu km	(mean)	count	per cent	million tonnes
Saltwater	361	1370.8	3.8 km	18,000	58	800–2,000
Freshwater	1.5	0.13	87 m	13,000	41	

Fish can also be demersal or pelagic. Demersal fish live on or near the bottom of oceans and lakes, while pelagic fish inhabit the water column away from the bottom. Habitats can also be vertically stratified. Epipelagic fish occupy sunlit waters down to 200 metres (110 fathoms), mesopelagic fish occupying deeper twilight waters down to 1,000 meters (3,300 ft), and bathypelagic fish inhabiting the cold and pitch black depths below.

Most oceanic species (78 per cent, or 44 per cent of all fish species), live near the shoreline. These coastal fish live on or above the relatively shallow continental shelf. Only 13 per cent of all fish species live in the open ocean, off the shelf. Of these, 1 per cent are epipelagic, 5 per cent are pelagic, and 7 per cent are deep water.

Fish are found in nearly all natural aquatic environments. Most fish, whether by species count or abundance, live in warmer environments with relatively stable temperatures. However, some species survive temperatures up to 44.6 °C (112.3 °F), while others cope with colder waters; there are over 200 finfish species south of the Antarctic Convergence. Some fish species tolerate salinities over 10 per cent.

Habitat	Abyssobrotula galatheae	The world's deepest living fish, Abyssobrotula galatheae, a species of cusk eel, lives in the Puerto Rico Trench at a depth of 8,372 meters (27,467 ft). Due to the extreme pressure, this appears to be around the theoretical maximum depth possible for fish.
Habitat	Stone loach	At the other extreme, the Tibetan stone loach lives at altitudes over 5,200 meters (17,100 ft) in the Himalayas.
Habitat	Blue shark	Some marine pelagic fish range over vast areas, such as the blue shark that lives in all oceans.
Habitat	Blind cave fish	Other fish are confined to single, small living spaces, such as the blind cave fish in North America.
Habitat	Death Valley pupfish	Equally isolated desert pupfish, like the Death Valley pupfish (pictured), live in small desert spring systems in Mexico and the southwest United States.
Habitat	Thermichthys hollisi	The bythitid vent fish Thermichthys hollisi lives around thermal vents 2,400 metres (1,300 fathoms) deep.
Habitat	Sargassum frogfish	The highly camouflaged sargassum frogfish lives in drifting sargassum seaweed. It has adapted fins which can grab strands of sargassum, enabling it to climb through the seaweed. It avoids threats from larger predator fish by climbing out of water onto the surface of a seaweed mat, where it can survive for some time.

== By life span ==
Some of the shortest-lived species are gobies, which are small coral reef–dwelling fish. Some of the longest-lived are rockfish.

Life span	Seven-figure pygmy goby	Gobies, a type of small coral reef-dwelling fish (pictured), are some of the shortest lived fishes. The seven-figure pygmy goby is the shortest lived of all fish species. It lives at most for 59 days, which is the shortest lifespan for any vertebrate.
Life span	Ram cichlid	Short lived fish have particular value in genetic studies on aging. In particular, the ram cichlid is used in laboratory studies because of its ease of breeding and predictable aging pattern.
Life span	Rougheye rockfish	Some of the longest living fishes are rockfish. The longest lived fish is the 205 years reported for the rougheye rockfish, Sebastes aleutianus (pictured). This fish is found offshore in the North Pacific at 25–900 metres (14–492 fathoms) and exhibits negligible senescence.
Life span	Orange roughy	The orange roughy may be the longest lived commercial fish, with a maximum reported age of 149 years.
Life span	Koi	There are stories about Japanese koi goldfish passed from generation to generation for 300 years. Scientists are sceptical. Counting growth lines on the scales of fish confined to ponds or bowls is unreliable, since they lay down extra lines. The maximum reliably reported age for a goldfish is 41 years.
Life span	Atlantic tarpon	One of the longest living sport fish is the Atlantic tarpon, with a reported age of 55 years.
Life span	Green sturgeon	Some of the longest living fish are living fossils, such as the green sturgeon. This species is among the longest-living species found in freshwater, with a reported age of 60 years. They are also among the largest fish species found in freshwater, with a maximum reported length of 2.5 meters (8.2 ft) and a maximum reported weight of 159 kg (351 lb).
Life span	Australian lungfish	Another living fossil is the Australian lungfish. One individual has lived in an aquarium for at least 75 years, and is the oldest fish in captivity. According to fossil records, the Australian lungfish has hardly changed for 380 million years.
Life span	Greenland shark	The Greenland shark has a lifespan of 392 ± 120 years. This is the longest known lifespan of all vertebrate species.

== By size ==
Size	Paedocypris progenetica	External image: World's smallest fish; Paedocypris progenetica, a type of minnow, is the smallest of all fish species. It lives in the dark-colored peat swamps of the Indonesian island of Sumatra. The females of this species have a standard length of 7.9 mm (0.31 in) at maturity. Until recently, this was the smallest of all known vertebrates. However, in 2012 a minute Papua New Guinea frog, Paedophryne amauensis, with a standard length of 7.7 mm (0.30 in) was discovered. The slender Indonesian fish may still be the smallest vertebrate by weight.
Size	Photocorynus spiniceps	Male individuals of the anglerfish species Photocorynus spiniceps are 6.2–7.3 mm (0.24–0.29 in) long at maturity, and thus could be claimed as an even smaller species. However, these males do not survive on their own merit, only by sexual parasitism on the larger female.
Size	Stout infantfish	The stout infantfish, a type of goby, is the second smallest known fish. Females grow to a length of 8.4 millimetres (0.33 in) and males are mature at 7 millimetres (0.28 in).
Size	Sinarapan	According to the Guinness Book of World Records, the sinarapan, also a goby, is the world's smallest commercially harvested fish. Found in the Philippines, they have an average length of 12.5 mm (0.49 in), and are threatened by overfishing.
Size	Whale shark	The largest fish is the whale shark. It is a slow-moving, filter-feeding shark with a maximum published length of 20 m (66 ft) and a maximum weight of 34 tonnes (33 long tons; 37 short tons). Whale sharks can live up to 70 years and are a vulnerable fish.
Size	Ocean sunfish	The ocean sunfish is the heaviest bony fish. It can weigh up to 2,300 kg (5,100 lb). It is found in all warm and temperate oceans.
Size	King of herrings	The king of herrings is the longest bony fish. Its total length can reach 11 m (36 ft), and it can weigh up to 272 kilograms (600 lb). It is a rarely seen oarfish, found in all the world's oceans at depths of between 20 m (66 ft) and 1,000 m (3,300 ft).
Size	Mekong giant catfish	The largest recorded freshwater fish is a Mekong giant catfish caught in 2010, weighing 293 kg (646 lb). The Mekong giant catfish is critically endangered.

== By breeding behavior ==
In very deep waters, it is not easy for a fish to find a mate. There is no light, so some species depend on bioluminescence. Others are hermaphrodites, which doubles their chances of producing both eggs and sperm when an encounter does occur.

Breeding	Grouper	Female groupers change their sex to male if no male is available. Grouper are protogynous hermaphrodites, who school in harems of three to fifteen females. When no male is available, the most aggressive and largest females change their sex to male.
Breeding	Toadfish	Male toadfish "sing" at up to 100 decibels with their swim bladders to attract mates.
Breeding	Anglerfish	Female Haplophryne mollis anglerfish trailing atrophied males she encountered (pictured). The female anglerfish releases pheromones to attract tiny males. When a male finds her, he bites on to her and holds on. When a male of the anglerfish species Haplophryne mollis bites into the skin of a female, he releases an enzyme that digests the skin of his mouth and her body, fusing the pair to the point where the two circulatory systems join up. The male then atrophies into nothing more than a pair of gonads. This extreme sexual dimorphism ensures that, when the female is ready to spawn, she has a mate immediately available.
Breeding	Hammerheads	Some sharks such as hammerheads are able to breed parthenogenetically, a type of asexual reproduction where the growth and development of embryos occur without fertilization.

== By brooding behavior ==
Fish adopt a variety of strategies for nurturing their brood. Sharks, for example, variously follow three protocols with their brood. Most sharks, including lamniformes, are ovoviviparous, bearing their young after the brood nourish themselves, both after hatching and before birth, by consuming the remnants of the yolk and other available nutrients. Some, such as hammerheads, are viviparous, bearing their young after nourishing hatchlings internally, analogously to mammalian gestation. Catsharks and others are oviparous, laying their eggs to hatch in the water.

Some animals, predominantly fish such as cardinalfish, practice mouthbrooding, caring for their offspring by holding them in the mouth of a parent for extended periods of time. Mouthbrooding has evolved independently in several different families of fish.

Brooding	Chain catshark	The chain catshark is oviparous, laying its eggs to hatch in the water.
Brooding	Great white shark	The great white shark is ovoviviparous, gestating eggs in the uterus for 11 months before giving birth.
Brooding	Scalloped hammerhead	The scalloped hammerhead is viviparous, bearing its young after nourishing hatchlings internally.
Brooding	Cyphotilapia frontosa	The female Cyphotilapia frontosa mouthbroods its fry. The fry can be seen looking out of her mouth.
Brooding	Seahorses	Seahorse males practice pouch-brooding similar to kangaroos. When seahorses mate, the female deposits her eggs into a special pouch on the male's belly. The pouch seals shut while he nurtures the developing eggs. Once the eggs hatch, the pouch opens and the male goes into labour.

== By feeding behaviour ==
There are three basic methods by which food is gathered into the mouths of fish: by suction feeding, by ram feeding, and by manipulation or biting. Nearly all fish species use one of these styles, and most use two.

Early fish lineages had inflexible jaws limited to little more than opening and closing. Modern teleosts have evolved protrusible jaws that can reach out to engulf prey. An extreme example is the protusible jaw of the slingjaw wrasse. Its mouth extends into a tube half as long as its body, which creates a strong suction to catch prey. The extended mouth tucks away under its body when not in use.

In practice, feeding modes lie on a spectrum, with suction and ram feeding at the extremes. Many fish capture their prey using both suction pressure combined with a forward motion of the body or jaw.

Most fish are food opportunists, or generalists. They eat whatever is most easily available. For example, the blue shark feeds on dead whales and nearly everything else that wriggles: other fish, cephalopods, gastropods, ascidians, or crustaceans. Ocean sunfish prefer jellyfish.

Feeding	Anglerfish	Anglerfish are lie-in-wait ambush predators. The first spine of their dorsal fin has been modified so it can be used like a fishing line with a lure at the end. Most anglerfish, like the one pictured, live in the darkness of the deep sea and have a bioluminescent lure.
Feeding	Archerfish	Archerfish prey on land-based insects and other small animals by shooting them down with water droplets from their specialized mouths. Archerfish are remarkably accurate; adults almost always hit the target on the first shot. They can bring down arthropods such as grasshoppers, spiders and butterflies on a branch of an overhanging tree 3 m (9.8 ft) above the water's surface. This is partially due to good eyesight, but also due to their ability to compensate for light refraction when aiming.
Feeding	Triggerfish	Triggerfish also use jets of water to uncover sand dollars buried in sand or overturn sea urchins.
Feeding	Silver arowana	Other fish have developed extreme specializations. Silver arowana, also called monkey fish, can leap two meters out of the water to capture prey. They usually swim near the surface of the water waiting for potential prey. Their main diet consists of crustaceans, insects, smaller fishes and other animals that float on the water surface, for which its draw-bridge-like mouth is exclusively adapted for feeding. The remains of small birds, bats, and snakes have also been found in their stomachs.
Feeding	Cookiecutter shark	The cookiecutter shark is a small dogfish which derives its name from the way it removes small circular plugs, looking as though cut with a cookie cutter, from the flesh and skin of cetaceans and larger fish, including other sharks. The cookiecutter attaches to its larger prey with its suctorial lips, and then protrudes its teeth to remove a symmetrical scoop of flesh. Pictured is a pomfret with bite wounds from a cookiecutter shark.
Feeding	Striped bass	Striped bass eat smaller fish.
Feeding	Chinese algae eater	Chinese algae eaters are kept in aquaria to control algae.
Feeding	Emperor angelfish	The Emperor angelfish feeds on coral sponges.
Feeding	Herring	Schooling herrings ram feed on copepods.
Feeding	Mangrove jack	The mangrove jack eats crustaceans.
Feeding	Puffer fish	Many puffer fish species crush the shells of molluscs.
Feeding	Bucktoothed tetra	The bucktoothed tetra eats scales off other fishes (lepidophagy) and molluscs.
Feeding	Cleaner fish	These two small wrasses are cleaner fish, which eat parasites off other fish.
Feeding	Cleaning station	A reef manta ray at a cleaning station, maintaining a near stationary position atop a coral patch for several minutes while being cleaned by cleaner fishes.
Feeding	Doctor fish	Doctor fish nibbling on the diseased skin of patients. Doctor fish (nibble fish) live and breed in the outdoor pools of some Turkish spas, where they feed on the skin of patients with psoriasis. The fish are like cleaner fish in that they only consume the affected and dead areas of the skin, leaving the healthy skin to recover.

== By vision ==
Many species of fish can see the ultraviolet end of the spectrum, beyond the violet wavelength of visible light.

Mesopelagic fishes live in the deeper waters of the twilight zone, down to depths of 1000 metres, where the amount of sunlight available is not sufficient to support photosynthesis. These fish are adapted for an active life under low light conditions.

Vision	Four-eyed fish	The four-eyed fish feeds at the surface of the water with eyes that allow it to see above and below the surface at the same time. Four-eyed fish have two specially-adapted eyes which are raised above the top of their head. The eyes are divided in two different parts, and the fish floats at the water surface with only the lower half of each eye underwater. The two halves are divided by a band of tissue and the eye has two pupils, connected by part of the iris. The upper half of the eye is adapted for vision in air, while the lower half is adapted for vision in water. The lens of the eye also changes in thickness top to bottom to account for the difference in the refractive indices of air versus water. Their diet mostly consists of the terrestrial insects which are available at the surface, where they spend most of their time.
Vision	Two stripe damselfish	The two stripe damselfish, Dascyllus reticulatus, has ultraviolet-reflecting colouration which they appear to use as an alarm signal to other fish of their species. Predatory species cannot see this if their vision is not sensitive to ultraviolet. There is further evidence for this view that some fish use ultraviolet as a "high-fidelity secret communication channel hidden from predators", while yet other species use ultraviolet to make social or sexual signals.
Vision	Barreleye	Barreleyes are a family of small, unusual-looking mesopelagic fishes, named for their barrel-shaped, tubular, telescopic eyes which are generally directed upwards to detect the silhouettes of available prey. The eyes, which dominate and protrude from the skull, may be swivelled forwards in some species. Their eyes have a large lens and a retina with an exceptional number of rod cells and a high density of rhodopsin (the "visual purple" pigment); there are no cone cells. The barreleye species Macropinna microstoma has a transparent protective dome over the top of its head, somewhat like the dome over an airplane cockpit, through which the lenses of its eyes can be seen. The dome is tough and flexible, and presumably protects the eyes from the nematocysts (stinging cells) of the siphonophores from which it is believed the barreleye steals food.
Vision	Flashlight fish	Flashlight fish use a retroreflector behind the retina and photophores to detect eyeshine in other fish.

== By shape ==
Boxfishes have heavily armoured plate-like scales fused into a solid, triangular, boxlike carapace, from which the fins, tail, eyes and mouth protrude. Because of this heavy armour, boxfish move slowly, but few other fish are able to eat the adults.

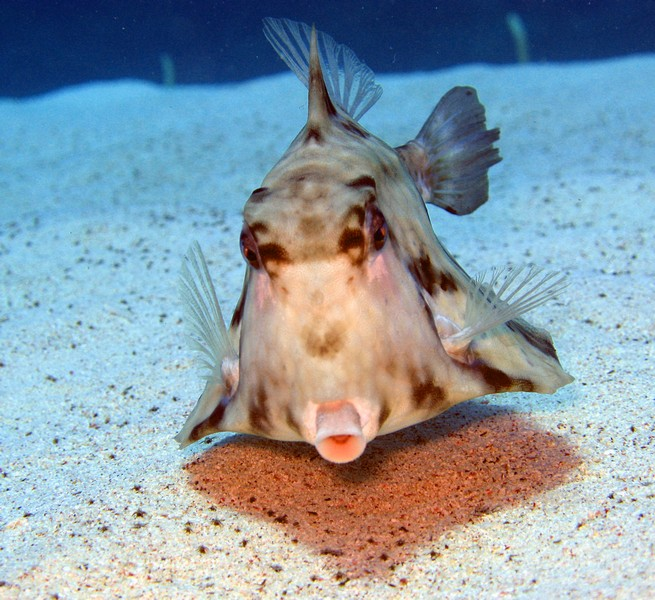
The humpback turretfish is a boxfish with an armoured triangular shaped body

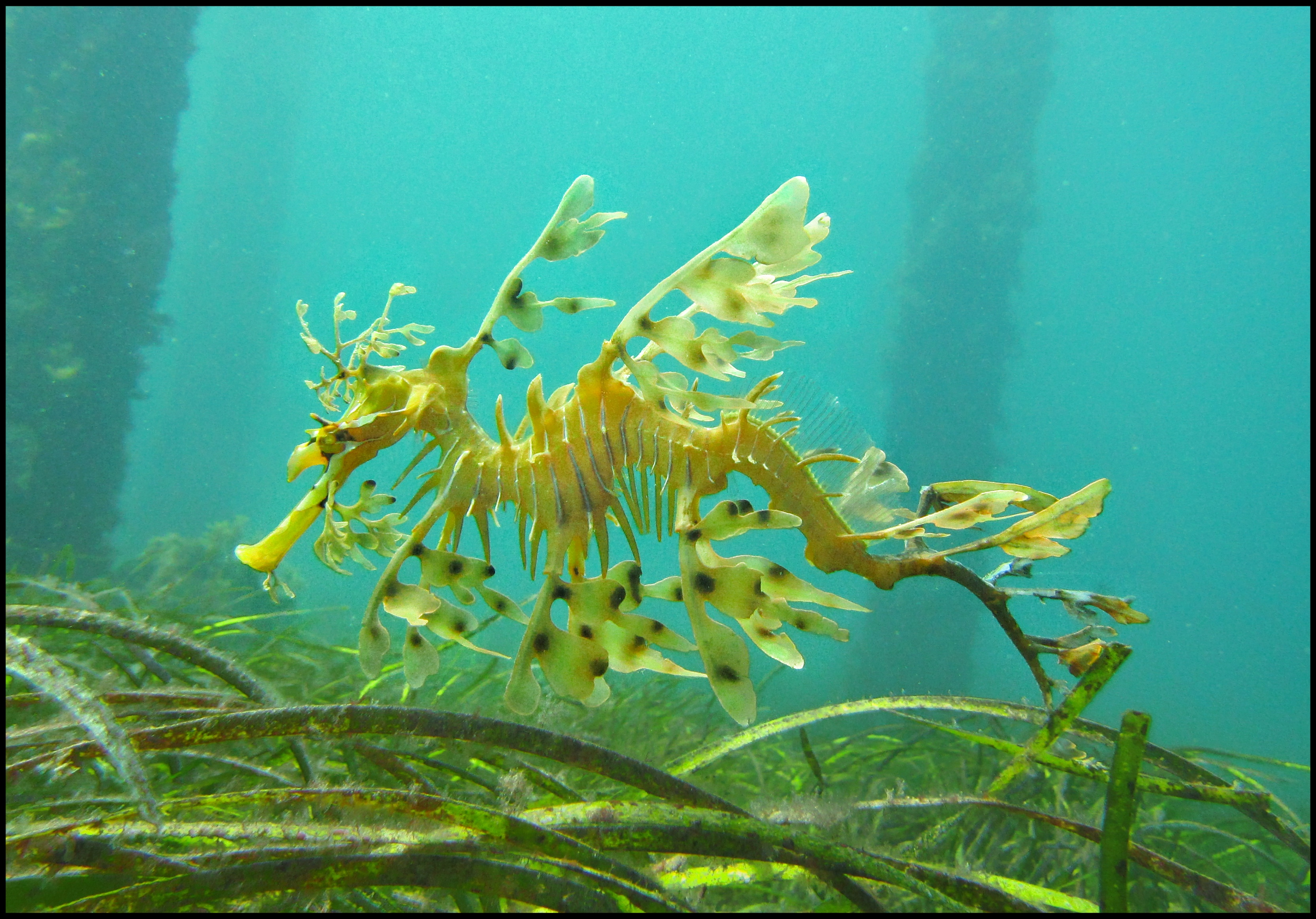
The leafy sea dragon is camouflaged to look like floating seaweed

== By locomotion ==
A number of species jump while swimming near the surface, skimming the water. Other species walk along the bottom on their fins. |}

Loco- motion	Dwarf seahorse	The slowest-moving fishes are the sea horses. The slowest of these, the tiny dwarf seahorse, has a sprint speed of one inch per minute.
Loco- motion	Atlantic bluefin tuna	The Atlantic bluefin tuna is capable of sustained high speed cruising, and maintains high muscle temperatures so it can cruise in relatively cold waters.
Loco- motion	Indo-Pacific sailfish	Among the fastesr sprinters are the Indo-Pacific sailfish (left) and the black marlin (right). Both have been recorded in a burst at over 110 kilometres per hour (68 mph). For the sailfish, that is equivalent to 12 to 15 times their own length per second.
Loco- motion	Shortfin mako	External videos: What makes mako sharks fast? National Geographic; The shortfin mako shark is fast and agile enough to chase down and kill an adult swordfish. However, sometimes in the struggle the swordfish kills the shark by ramming it in the gills or belly. The shortfin mako's speed has been recorded at 50 kilometres per hour (31 mph), and there are reports that it can achieve bursts of up to 74 kilometres per hour (46 mph). It can jump up to 9 meters (30 ft) in the air. Due to its speed and agility, this high-leaping fish is sought as game worldwide. This shark is highly migratory. Its exothermic constitution partly accounts for its relatively great speed.
Loco- motion	Wahoo	The wahoo is perhaps the fastest fish for its size, attaining a speed of 19 lengths per second, reaching 78 kilometres per hour (48 mph).
Loco- motion	Flying fish	Flying fish have unusually large pectoral fins, which enable the fish to take short gliding flights above the surface of the water in order to escape from predators. Their glides are typically around 50 meters (160 ft), but they can use updrafts at the leading edge of waves to cover distances of at least 400 meters (1,300 ft). In May 2008, a flying fish was filmed off the coast of Japan (see video). The fish spent 45 seconds aloft, and was able to stay aloft by occasionally beating the surface of the water with its caudal (tail) fin. The previous record was 42 seconds.
Loco- motion	Climbing perches	Climbing perches are a family of fishes which have the ability to climb out of water and "walk" short distances. As labyrinth fishes, they possess a labyrinth organ, a structure in the fish's head which allows it to breathe atmospheric oxygen. Their method of terrestrial locomotion uses the gill plates as supports, and the fish pushes itself using its fins and tail.
Loco- motion	Mudskipper	External videos: Mudskippers: The Fish That Walk on Land BBC Earth; The mudskipper is another type of walking fish. Walking fish are often amphibious and can travel over land for extended periods of time. These fish may use a number of means of locomotion, including springing, snake-like lateral undulation, and tripod-like walking. The mudskipper is able to spend days moving about out of water and can even climb mangroves, although to only modest heights. There are some species of fish that can "walk" along the sea floor but not on land. One such animal is the flying gurnard.
Loco- motion	Handfish	External videos: Fish that walk CSIRO; The handfish walks along the seafloor using its pectoral fins, which look like hands.
Loco- motion	Tripod fish	External videos: Fish that perch Okeanos Explorer ROV; Deepsea tripod fishes use their very elongate pelvic fins and caudal fin, which act like "stilts", to perch and walk on the seafloor.

== By toxicity ==
Toxic fish produce strong poisons in their bodies. Both poisonous fish and venomous fish contain toxins, but deliver them differently.

- Venomous fish bite, sting, or stab, causing an envenomation. Venomous fish don't necessarily cause poisoning if they are eaten, since the digestive system often destroys the venom.
- By contrast, poisonous fish do not bite, sting, or stab to deliver their toxins, but they are poisonous to eat because they contain toxins in their body that the digestive system does not destroy.

A 2006 study found that there are at least 1200 species of venomous fish. There are more venomous fish than venomous snakes. In fact, there are more venomous fish than the combined total of all other venomous vertebrates. Venomous fish are found in almost all habitats around the world, but mostly in tropical waters. They wound over 50,000 people every year.

Venomous fish carry their venom in venom glands and use various delivery systems, such as spines, sharp fins, barbs, spikes or fangs. Venomous fish tend to be either very visible, using flamboyant colors to warn enemies, or skilfully camouflaged and may be buried in the sand. Apart from the defense or hunting value, venom helps bottom-dwelling fish by killing the bacteria that tries to invade their skin. Few of these venoms have been studied. They are a yet-to-be-tapped resource for bioprospecting to find drugs with medical uses.

Treatment for venom stings usually includes the application of heat, using water at temperatures of about 45 °C (113 °F), since heat breaks down most complex venom proteins.

Toxicity	Puffer fish	The puffer fish is the most poisonous fish in the world. It is the second most poisonous vertebrate after the golden dart frog. It paralyzes the diaphragm muscles of human victims, who can die from suffocation. In Japan, skilled chefs use parts of a closely related species, the blowfish, to create a delicacy called "fugu", including just enough toxin for that "special flavour".
Toxicity	Spotted trunkfish	The spotted trunkfish, a reef fish, secretes a colourless ciguatera toxin from glands on its skin when touched. The toxin is only dangerous when ingested, so the fish poses no immediate risk to human divers. However, predators as large as nurse sharks can die from eating a trunkfish.
Toxicity	Giant moray	The giant moray is a reef fish at the top of the food chain. Like many other apex reef fish, it is likely to cause ciguatera poisoning if eaten. Outbreaks of ciguatera poisoning in the 11th to 15th centuries from large, carnivorous reef fish, caused by harmful algal blooms, could be a reason why Polynesians migrated to Easter Island, New Zealand, and possibly Hawaii.
Toxicity	Reef stonefish	The most venomous known fish is the reef stonefish. It has a remarkable ability to camouflage itself amongst rocks. It is an ambush predator that sits on the bottom waiting for prey to approach. Instead of swimming away if disturbed, it erects the 13 venomous spines along its back. For defense, it can shoot venom from each or all of these spines. Each spine is like a hypodermic needle, delivering the venom from two sacs attached to the spine. The stonefish has control over whether to shoot its venom, and does so when provoked or frightened. The venom results in severe pain, paralysis and tissue death, and can be fatal if not treated. Despite its formidable defenses, stonefish have predators. Some bottom feeding rays and sharks with crushing teeth feed on them, as does the Stokes's sea snake.
Toxicity	Lionfish	Head on view of the lionfish, a venomous coral reef fish (pictured). Unlike stonefish, a lionfish can release venom only if something strikes its spines. Although not native to the U.S. coast, lionfish have appeared around Florida and have spread up the coast to New York. They are attractive aquarium fish, sometimes used to stock ponds, and may have been washed into the sea during a hurricane. Lionfish can aggressively dart at scuba divers and attempt to puncture their facemask with their venomous spines.
Toxicity	Stargazer	The stargazer, Uranoscopus sulphureus. The stargazer buries itself and can deliver electric shocks as well as venom. It is a delicacy in some cultures (cooking destroys the venom), and can be found for sale in some fish markets with the electric organ removed. They have been called "the meanest things in creation".
Toxicity	Stingray	Stingrays can sting with their stinger (pictured). Such envenomations can occur to people who wade in shallow water and tread on them. This can be avoided by shuffling through the sand or stamping on the bottom, as the rays detect this and swim away. The stinger usually breaks off in the wound. It is barbed, so it can easily penetrate but cannot be easily removed. The stinger causes local trauma from the cut itself, pain and swelling from the venom, and possible later infection from bacteria. Occasionally, severed arteries or death can result.

== By human use ==
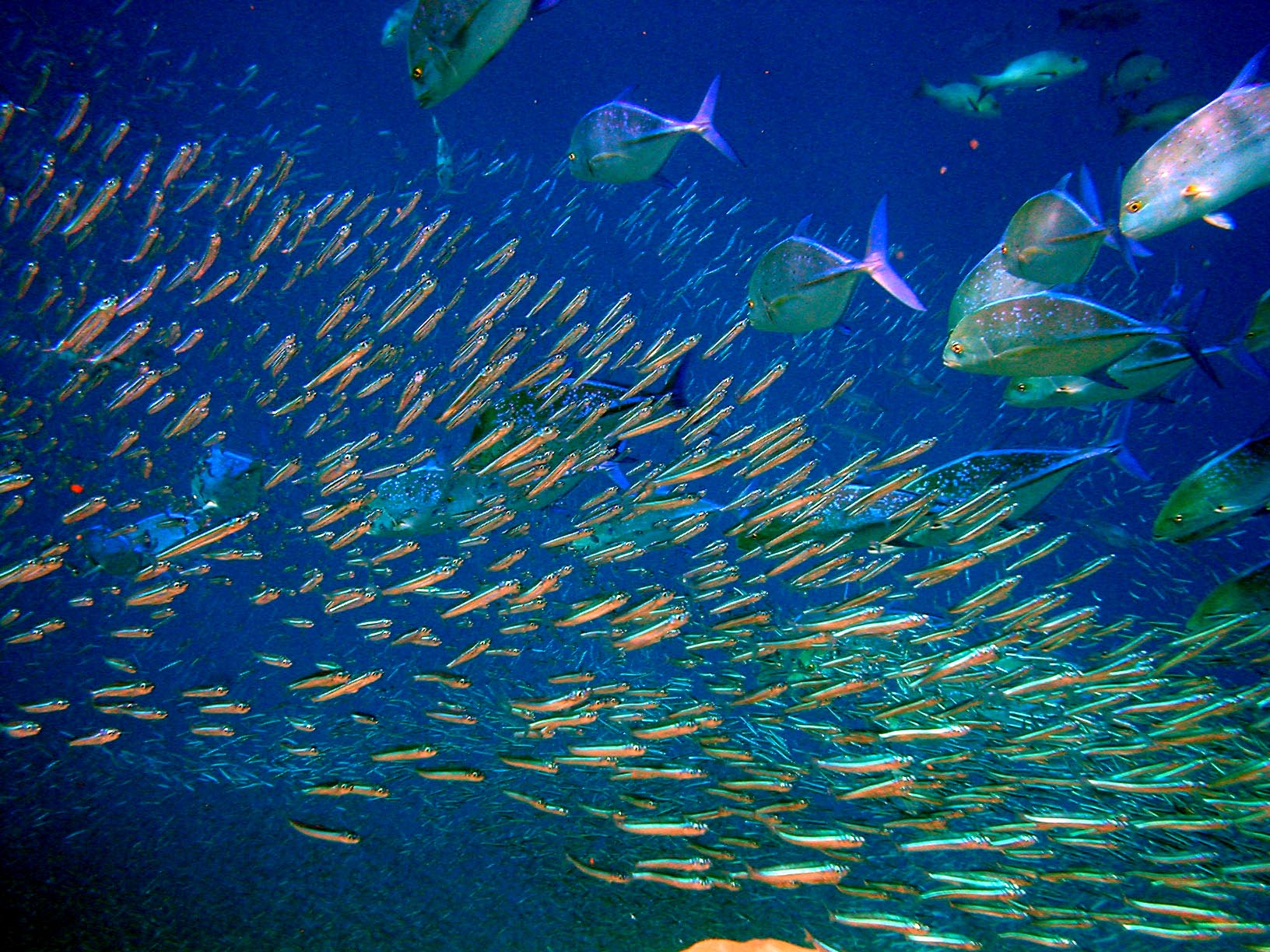
Predator fish size up schooling forage fish

Fish are sought after by humans for their value as commercial food fish, recreational sport fish, decorative aquarium fish and for tourism, as they attract snorkelers and scuba divers.

Throughout human history, important fisheries have been based on forage fish. Forage fish are small fish which are eaten by larger predators. They usually school together for protection. Typical ocean forage fish feed near the bottom of the food chain on plankton, often by filter feeding. They include the family Clupeidae (herrings, sardines, menhaden, hilsa, shad and sprats), as well as anchovies, capelin and halfbeaks. Important herring fisheries have existed for centuries in the North Atlantic and the North Sea. Likewise, important traditional for anchovy and sardine fisheries have operated in the Pacific, the Mediterranean, and the southeast Atlantic. The world annual catch of forage fish in recent years has been around 25 million tonnes, or one quarter of the world's total catch.

Higher in the food chain, Gadidae (cod, pollock, haddock, saithe, hake and whiting) also support important fisheries. Concentrated initially in the North Sea, Atlantic cod was one of Europe's oldest fisheries, later extending to the Grand Banks. Declining numbers led to international "cod wars" and eventually the virtual abandonment of these fisheries. In modern times, the Alaska pollock supports an important fishery in the Bering Sea and the north Pacific, yielding about 6 million tonnes, while cod amounts to about 9 million tonnes.

- Food fish, Oily fish, whitefish
- Farmed fish
- fish used for medicinal purposes

Recreational and sport fishing is big business U.S. saltwater fishers spend about $30 billion annually and support 350,000 jobs. Some of the more popular recreational and sport fish include bass, marlin, porgie, shad, mahi-mahi, smelt whiting, swordfish, and walleye.

Fishkeeping is another popular pastime, and there is a large international trade for aquarium fish.

Snorkeling and scuba diving attracts millions of people to beaches, coral reefs, lakes, and other bodies of water to view fish and other marine life.

Human use	Yellowfin tuna	Yellowfin tuna are now being fished as a replacement for the depleted southern bluefin tuna.
Human use	Anchovy	These schooling anchovy are forage fish.
Human use	Atlantic cod	Atlantic cod fisheries have collapsed.
Human use	Alaska pollock	The Alaska pollock has been described as "the largest remaining source of palatable fish in the world".
Human use	Koi	Koi (and goldfish) have been kept in decorative ponds for centuries in China and Japan.

== Other ==
Other	Bony-eared assfish	Fish hold the records for the relative brain weights of vertebrates. Most vertebrate species have similar brain-to-body weight ratios. The deep sea bathypelagic bony-eared assfish has the smallest ratio of all known vertebrates.
Other	Elephantnose fish	At the other extreme, the elephantnose fish, an African freshwater fish, has an exceptionally large brain-to-body weight ratio. These fish have the largest brain-to-body oxygen consumption ratio of all known vertebrates.
Other	Hallucinogenic fish	The hallucinogenic dream fish, Sarpa salpa, a species of bream recognizable by the golden stripes running the length of its body, can induce LSD-like hallucinations if it is eaten. These widely distributed coastal fish became a recreational drug during the Roman Empire, and are called "the fish that make dreams" in Arabic. Other hallucinogenic fish are Siganus spinus, called "the fish that inebriates" in Reunion Island, and Mulloidichthys samoensis, called "the chief of ghosts" in Hawaii.
Other	Nopoli rockclimbing goby	The Nopoli rockclimbing goby uses its mouth to climb waterfalls by inching up rocks like a caterpillar, using its mouth as a sucker together with another sucker on its stomach. When the fish is young, it undergoes a radical transformation when it moves from saltwater to a freshwater stream. The mouth migrates over a period of two days from the front of its head to its chin. This allows the fish to feed by scraping algae from rocks. Pictured is the goby before and after the transformation.
Other	Vampire fish	Smaller species of vampire fish, native to the Amazon River, have an alleged tendency to burrow into and parasitise the human urethra. However, despite ethnological reports dating back to the late 19th century, the first documented case of the removal of a vampire fish from a human urethra did not occur until 1997, and even that incident has remained a matter of controversy.

== See also ==
- Largest organisms
- List of long-living organisms
- Maximum life span
- Smallest organisms
