= Mahi-mahi fishing =

Type of game fishing

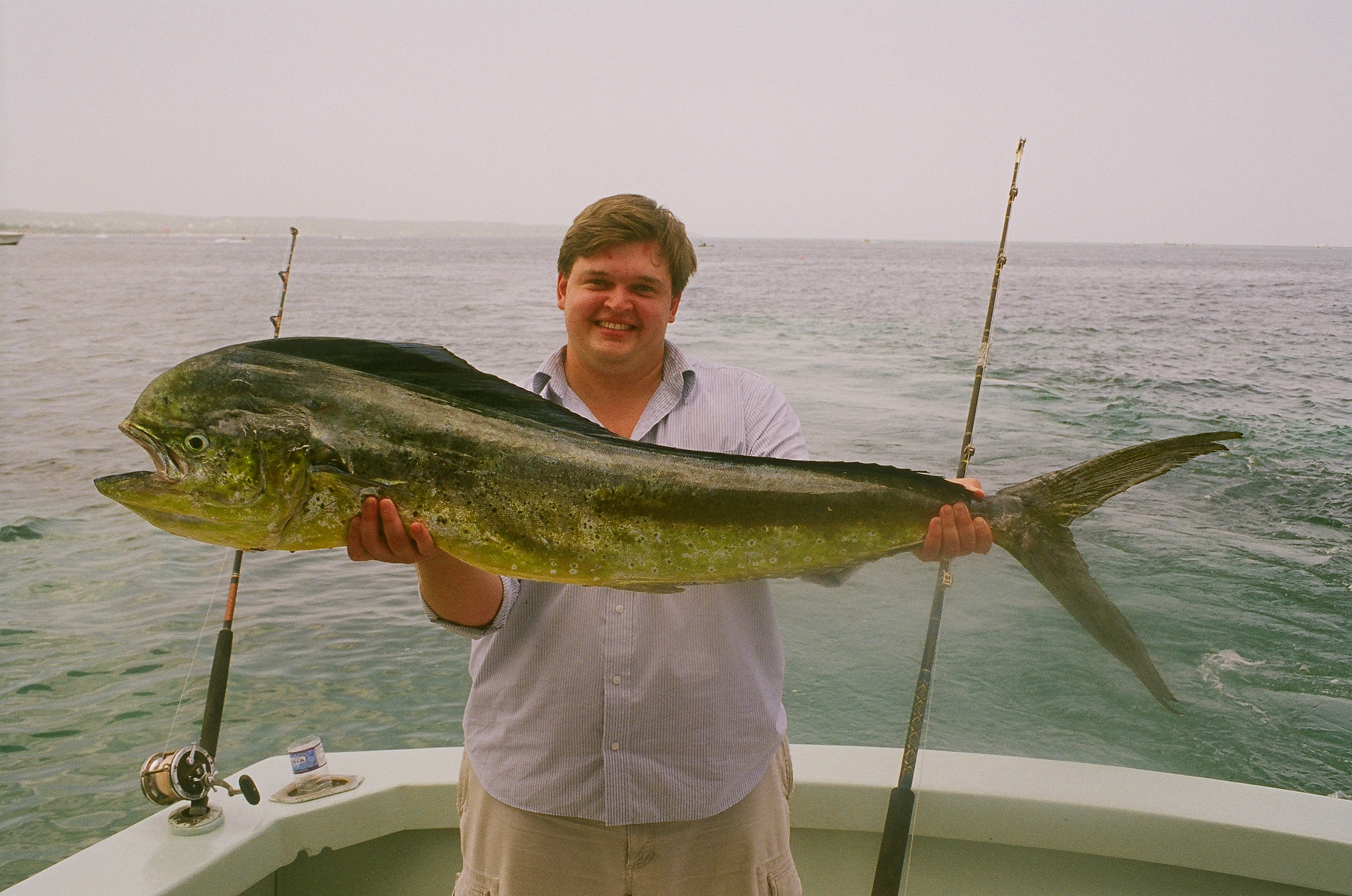
Female mahi-mahi caught off the coast of Jamaica

Mahi-mahi are swift and acrobatic game fish with striking colours. These colours darken when the fish dies (see illustrations) The current IGFA all tackle record is 39.91 kilograms (88lb), caught in 1998 in Exuma, Bahamas by Chris Johnson of Lake Mary, Florida. Catches average 7 to 13 kilograms (15 to 29 lb), and any mahi-mahi over 18 kilograms (40 lb) is exceptional. Males are often larger than females.

Mahi mahi are also known as dorado or dolphin fish.

== Description ==
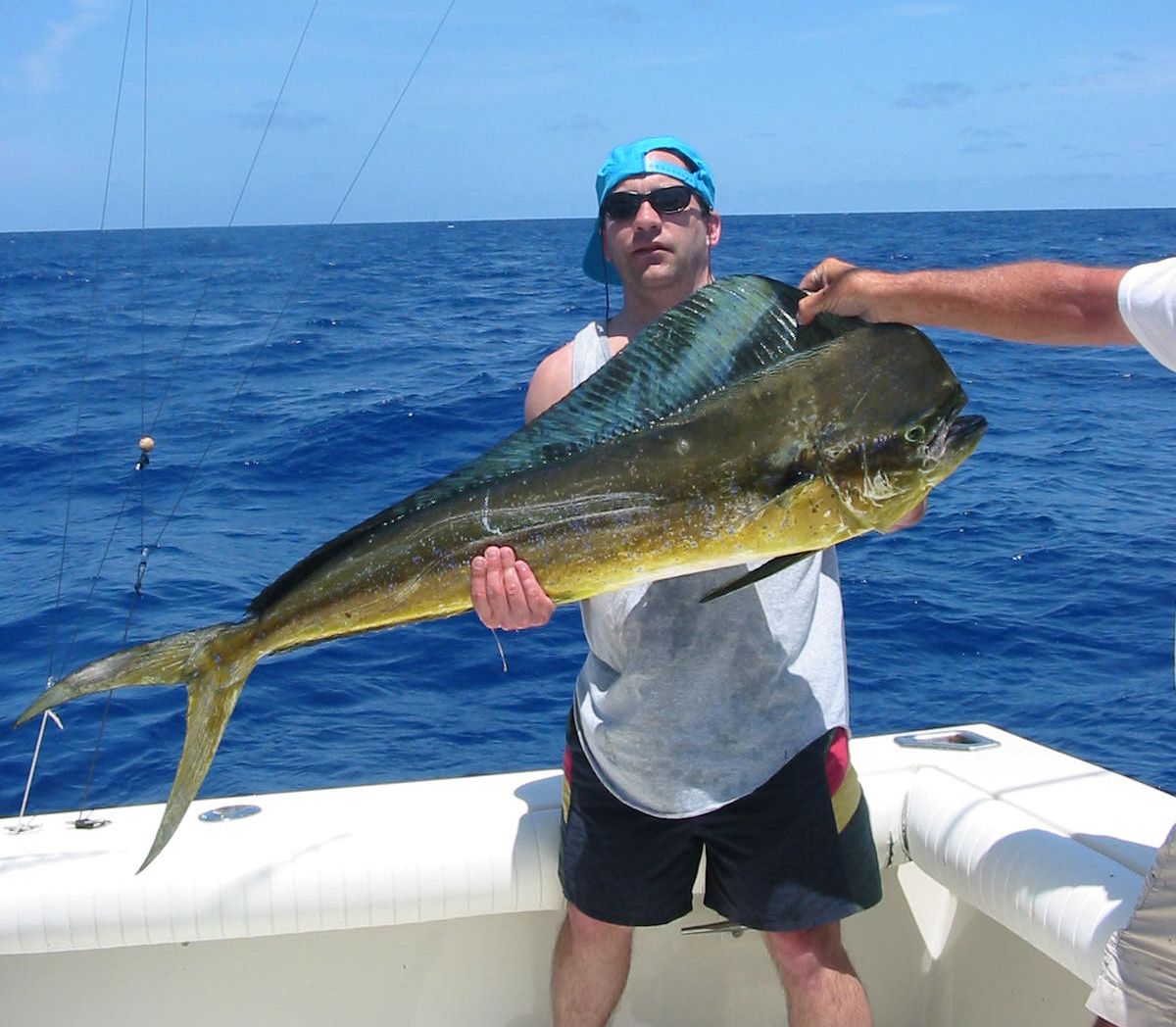
Bull (male) mahi-mahi caught in the Florida Keys

Mahi-mahi are a blue-water, open ocean, highly migratory schooling fish found around the world in tropical and subtropical waters at depths up to 85 metres (279 ft), but more typically near 37 metres (121 ft). They feed on forage fish, such as mackerel and squid, and also zooplankton and crustaceans. They are particularly adapted to hunting flying fish.

They spawn in warm ocean currents throughout much of the year, and their young are often found among seaweed. They are a relatively short lived species, with a life span of only four or five years. Mahi-mahi are among the fastest growing fish, with a minimum population doubling time under 15 months. This makes them resilient to fishing pressure. However, their current vulnerability is moderate to high.

== Fishing techniques ==
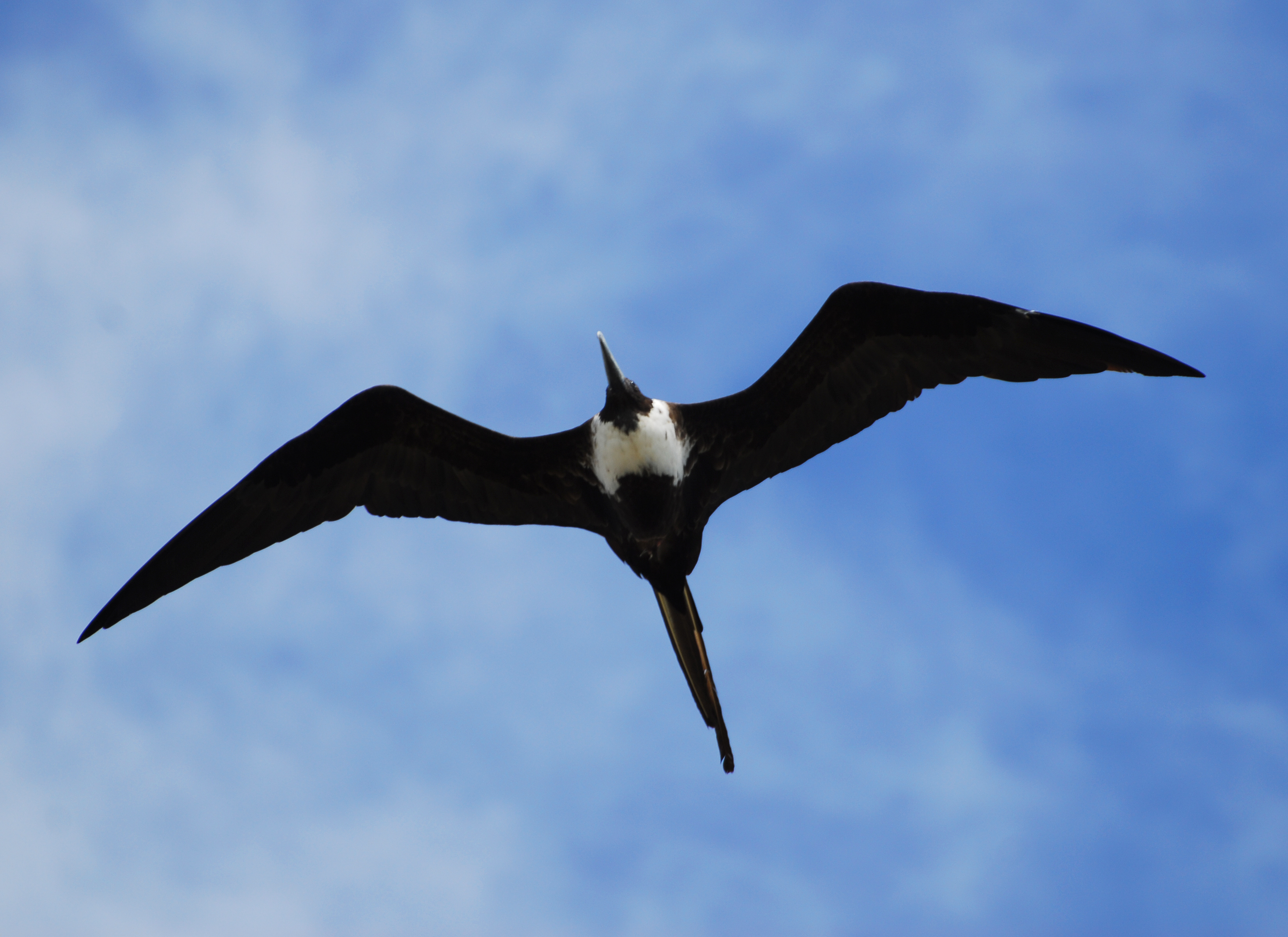
Frigate birds can indicate the presence of mahi-mahi.

In earlier years, mahi-mahi were known mainly as bycatch in tuna and swordfish longline commercial fisheries. Now they are sought in their own right by commercial and recreational fishermen.

A typical fishing technique is to take a sport fishing boat to the edge of a reef in about 120 feet (37 m) of water and troll near a line of floating sargasso weed. Mahi-mahi often congregate around marine debris such as floating boards, palm trees and fronds, often found in association with such weed lines. Sargasso sometimes holds a complete ecosystem from microscopic creatures to seahorses, small crabs, juvenile triggerfish and other bait fish. Frigate birds dive for the food accompanying the debris or sargasso. Other fish may be present in the area. Experienced fishermen can tell what species are likely around the debris by the birds' behaviour.

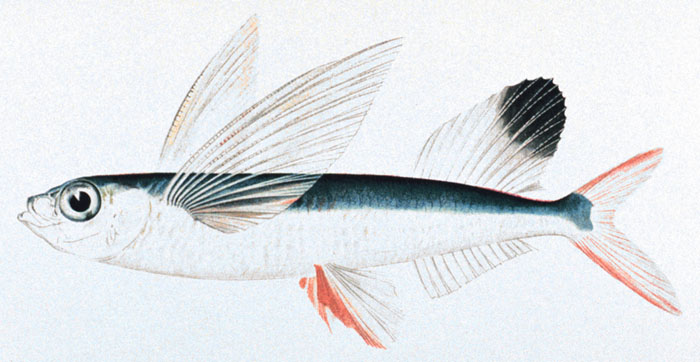
Mahi-mahi hunt flying fish

Mahi-mahi typically are taken by trolling ballyhoo on the surface with 30 to 50 pound line test tackle. Once a school of Mahi are encountered, casting with small jigs or fly casting using a bait-and-switch technique can be successful. Ballyhoo or a net full of live sardines tossed into the water can be used to excite the mahi-mahis into a feeding frenzy. Hookless teaser lures can also be employed in the same manner. The teasers or live chum are tossed into the water, the fly is thrown to the feeding mahi-mahi. Once hooked, mahi-mahi are acrobatic game fish displaying spectacular blue, yellow and green colours.

A very different technique uses land based kites, instead of boats and rods, as the mechanism for delivering the terminal tackle at the end of a fishing line. This method has been used to catch mahi-mahi from cliff tops in Hawaii.

In French Polynesia, mahi-mahi are caught with a harpoon. Mahi-mahi don't dive when they are pursued. A specifically designed boat, called the poti marara, is used. This boat is a powerful motorized V-bottom boat, optimized for high agility and speed, and driven with a stick so that the pilot can hold his harpoon with his right hand.

== Distribution ==
Mahi-mahi are found around the world in all tropical and subtropical oceans. Around North America, mahi-mahi are fished recreationally along the Pacific coast, particularly in the Gulf of California, off the coast of Costa Rica, and offshore in the Atlantic Ocean from New Jersey to Florida. Popular recreational fisheries for mahi-mahi are located in the Gulf of Mexico, along the Pacific coast of Costa Rica, along the Pacific coast of Panama and the Caribbean Sea, around Hawaiʻi, around Southeast Asia, and along the coast of Oman in the Arabian Sea.

== In popular media ==
Mahi-mahi, referred to as dorado, are the subject of a significant section of the Yann Martel novel Life of Pi. Martel describes a fight to catch the "writhing mass of pure muscle...with a bulging forehead that speaks of a forceful personality" as "giving me a ride like I imagine a bucking bronco would give a cowboy."
