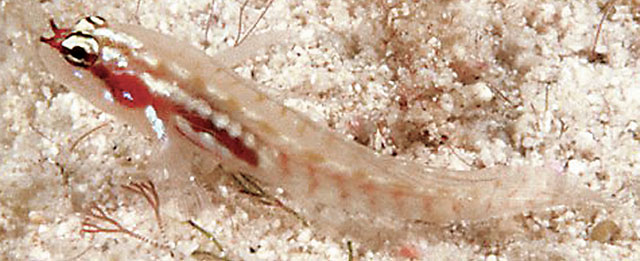

Conservation status
- Least Concern (IUCN 3.1)

Scientific classification
- Kingdom: Animalia
- Phylum: Chordata
- Class: Actinopterygii
- Order: Gobiiformes
- Family: Gobiidae
- Genus: Eviota
- Species: E. sigillata

Binomial name
- Eviota sigillata S. L. Jewett & Lachner, 1983

= Eviota sigillata =

Species of fish

Eviota sigillata, commonly called seven-figure pygmy goby or adorned dwarfgoby, is a species of marine fish in the family Gobiidae. They are widespread throughout the tropical waters of the Indo-West Pacific area, from the Seychelles to the Micronesia.

It inhabits reef habitats at depths from 3 to 20 m (9.8–65.6 ft). This species has the shortest lifespan for a vertebrate, living for at most 59 days. About three weeks are as pelagic larvae, two weeks settling on the reef and three weeks as adults.

This pygmy goby can reach a length of 3 centimetres (1.2 in).

== See also ==
- Pandaka pygmaea
