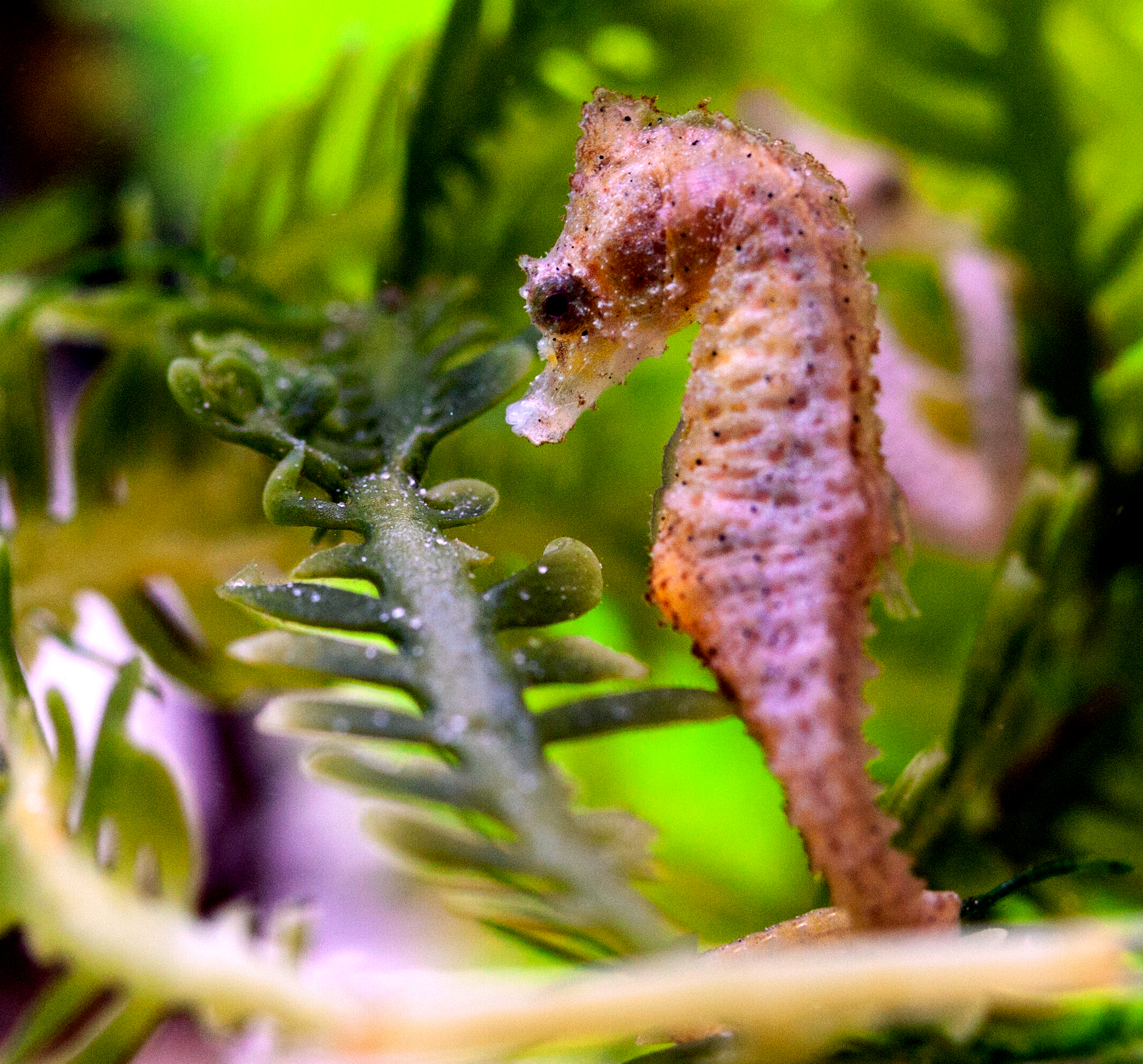

Conservation status
- Least Concern (IUCN 3.1)
- CITES Appendix II

Scientific classification
- Kingdom: Animalia
- Phylum: Chordata
- Class: Actinopterygii
- Division: Teleostei
- Order: Syngnathiformes
- Family: Syngnathidae
- Genus: Hippocampus
- Species: H. zosterae

Binomial name
- Hippocampus zosterae D. S. Jordan & C. H. Gilbert, 1882

Synonyms
- Hippocampus rosamondae Borodin, 1928; Hippocampus regulus Ginsburg, 1933

= Dwarf seahorse =

Species of fish

The dwarf seahorse (Hippocampus zosterae) is a species of seahorse found in the subtidal aquatic beds of the Bahamas and parts of the United States. It is threatened by habitat loss. According to Guinness World Records, it is the slowest-moving fish, with a top speed of about 5 feet (1.5 m) per hour.

It is most often white in color but can range from tan, brown, yellow and green. In the wild, it often has small skin growths called cirri that resemble algae.

== Description ==
Like other seahorses, the dwarf seahorse has a head angled at right angles to its body and swims upright using its dorsal fin to propel it and its pectoral fins to steer. It grows to an average length of 2 and 2.5 cm (0.8 and 1.0 in), with a maximum length of 5.0 cm (2.0 in).

The dwarf seahorse can live up to 2 years, but most commonly live around 1.

It can be found in colors of beige, yellow, green, and black and may have white speckles, dark spots or protrusions and is well-camouflaged, the coloring usually matching the gorgonian on which it is typically found. It can change color.

It has been observed that this seahorse changes color for various reasons such as camouflage, reaction to an attack, due to an illness, or during mating.

H. zosterae can be distinguished from other western Atlantic species such as H. reidi and H. erectus thanks to its number of fin rays. This species possesses from 10 to 13 dorsal and pectoral fin rays, and 9 to 10 trunk rings. Fully grown H. zosterae adults are usually smaller than these two other species.

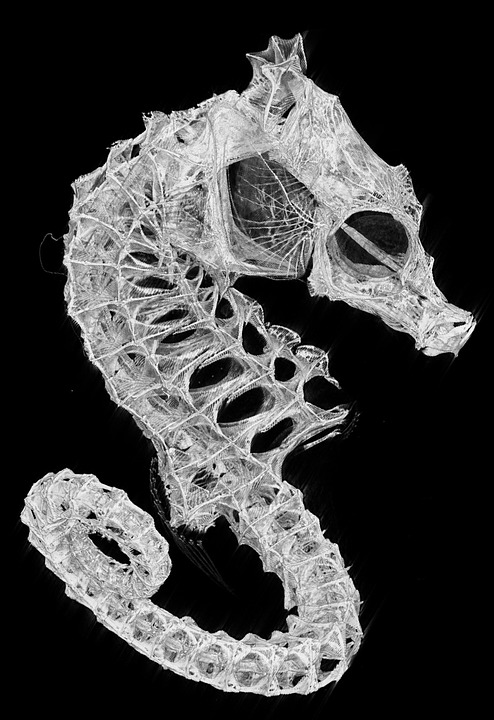
3D computed tomography (CT) scan of dwarf seahorse skeleton

== Habitat ==
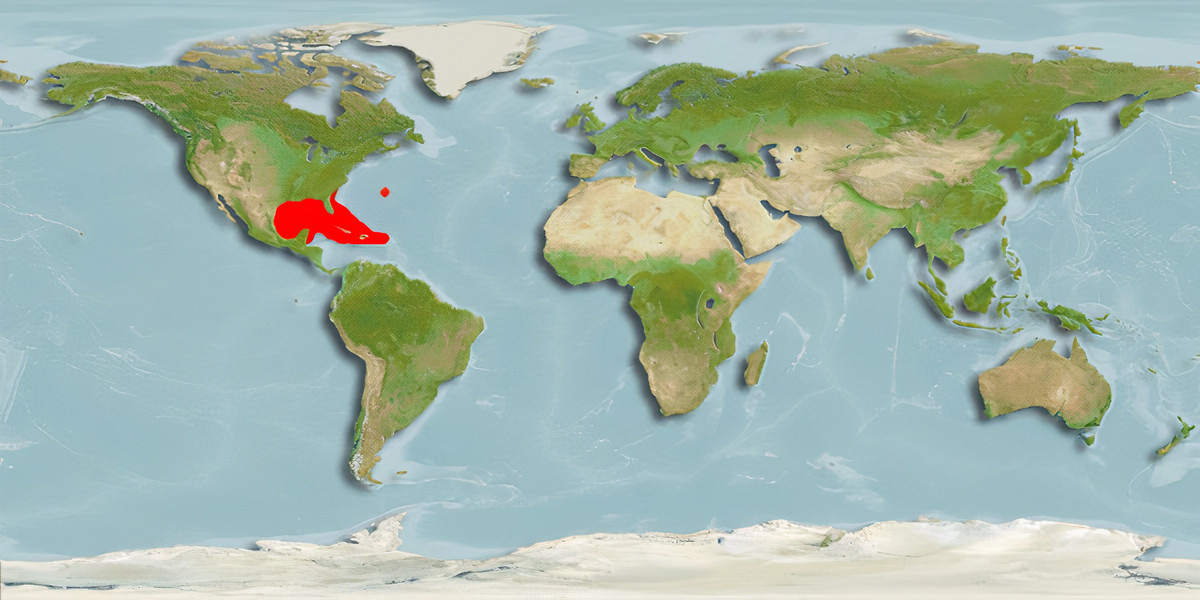
Dwarf seahorse range

H. zosterae are found on the western end of the Atlantic Ocean, precisely in the coastal Gulf of Mexico, Bahamas, Bermuda, the Florida Keys, Florida's east coast, Old Tampa Bay, Lemon Bay, Pensacola, and Texas.

They are restricted almost totally to seagrass microhabitats in shallow water, particularly in association with seagrasses of the genus Zostera. They are most common in bays during periods of high salinity, in coral reefs, floating vegetations, and between roots in mangrove swamps.

They often live as a pair, sometimes alone. Males are rather sedentary and live in a small home range of about 1 square metre (11 sq ft), whereas females roam on other males' territory, around a hundred times larger than theirs.

== Diet ==
The dwarf seahorse is a lie-in-wait predator, feeding on living prey, including small crustaceans such as amphipods, small shrimps, other small invertebrates, and fish fry. Once their target is fixed, the hunter stretches towards it and sucks it through its snout. Food progresses through the digestive system rapidly, causing the nutrients to be ill-absorbed. This is the reason seahorses require large amounts of food to survive. These creatures can consume up to 3,000 brine-shrimps per day.

== Reproduction ==
Although, as every other seahorse species, it is the male that carries the offspring, they must still compete to access a mate. Males will tail wrestle and snap their heads toward each other and make clicking sounds during competition for access to a female. They display an eloquent courtship dance that begins each morning until copulation takes place.

Females initiate courtship behavior by entering the male's territory. Once she has entered his territory, the male initiates the actual behavior. In the first courtship phase the male and female change color and take turns quivering. This phase lasts for one to two mornings before copulation. The following phases of courtship behavior occur on the day of copulation. During the second phase the female displays a pointing posture with the head pointed upward. In return the male displays quivering and pumping behaviors in response to the females pointing. In the third phase the male assumes the pointing posture in response to the female's pointing. Finally, in the last phase of the courtship behavior, the pair repeatedly rise in the water column. The male pumps his tail toward his body and eventually the pair intertwine their tails. The female inserts her ovipositor and transfers the eggs into the male's brood pouch during the final rise in the water column. After eggs are deposited, the male rocks back and forth to settle the eggs in its pouch.

Males carry between 3 and 55 soon-to-be younglings in their brood pouch for around 10 days before releasing them. Just born dwarf seahorses are 7 to 9 mm long, while the diameter of the eggs in the pouch was around 1.3 mm.

Although females could technically mate with several males, seahorses form strict monogamous pair bonds for an entire season at least, a rare sight in fish species. Female seahorses remain faithful during the pregnancy by returning to the male's territory each day for an early morning greeting. During the greeting, the pair change colors and dance together for about 6 minutes. Adult dwarf seahorses are iteroparous, meaning that they have multiple reproductive cycles in the course of their lifetime, in this case 2 per month.

Dwarf seahorses remate within 4 to 20 hours after the young have been released from the brood pouch. This may occur throughout the breeding season. The breeding season starts in mid-February and ends in late October, depending on day length and water temperature.

== Development ==
Each larva grows and develops in its own tissue pocket which is surrounded by a network of blood vessels. The brood pouch is comparable to a "pseudoplacenta": after the eggs are deposited, the walls of the pouch thicken and become more porous. The pouch provides protection, oxygen, nourishment, and waste removal.

During their growth in the brood pouch, dorsal fin rays develop first, followed by anal fins. The mouth apparatus's development follows, but it is not functional until juveniles are released from the brood pouch.

Compared to an adult seahorse, offspring within the brood pouch have a rounded tail instead of tetrahedral tail, a wider and shorter snout, a dorsal fin that is closer to the tail, and pectoral fins that are closer to the back of the head.

Season and water temperature disproportionately influences the sex ratio of developing seahorses.

Once the offspring are released in the environment, they are completely independent of their parents. They are able to swim and feed immediately, but their weak swimming ability and high predation diminishes their rate of survival.

The growth of H. zosterae is relatively rapid, especially during the summer season; both male and female are fully grown after 3 to 4 months. Sexual maturity of the male can be determined by the presence of its brood pouch.

== Predation ==
Dwarf seahorses' predators include tunas, dorados, skates and rays, crabs, and water birds. Although the adults can protect themselves with their camouflage abilities, the young are not capable yet and are thus at a greater risk.

The seahorse's role in the ecosystems is vital, as they regulate populations of their marine preys, but also help their predators by becoming the prey themselves.

== In captivity ==
The dwarf seahorse only reaches up to 2 inches (51 mm) in length and is not an aggressive feeder. Therefore, it is typically kept in small aquariums (5 to 10 US gallons (19 to 38 L)). The dwarf seahorse can be fed brine shrimp nauplii, although it will also eat copepods and other shrimp larvae. Because of its short digestive tract, food must be available to them all day, making it a difficult species to keep. Unlike most marine fish, it will readily breed in the aquarium. The seahorse fry can be kept in the same aquarium as the adults in a dwarf seahorse dedicated tank. The dwarf seahorse has a gestation period of 10–14 days and can live up to over 2 years in captivity. The water temperature in the aquarium must place between 20 and 28 °C (68 and 82 °F), with a pH ranging around 8–8.5. The tank water must be renewed regularly, once, or twice a day. The survival rate of dwarf seahorses in captivity is around 20%.

== Interest for humans ==
This species was particularly popular in the 1960s when mail order companies commonly sold them as the 'perfect pets'.

Due to its tiny size, the dwarf seahorse remains very popular in the aquarium market. Several Florida located fisheries' core business lay around dwarf seahorses capture and trade.

Chinese medicine is one of the biggest consumers of seahorses, as an estimated 20 million seahorses are used each year. They supposedly have cholesterol decrease virtues, preventing atherosclerosis.

== Conservation ==
Before 1970, this species was regarded as common. However, numbers have decreased over subsequent years, most likely due to a reduction in the extent of seagrass beds, pollution, oil spills, and ocean acidification.

The IUCN Red List of Threatened Species classified H. zosterae as vulnerable in 2000. As of 2016, it is classified as least concern. All species in the genus Hippocampus, including H. zosterae, are included in appendix II of CITES.
