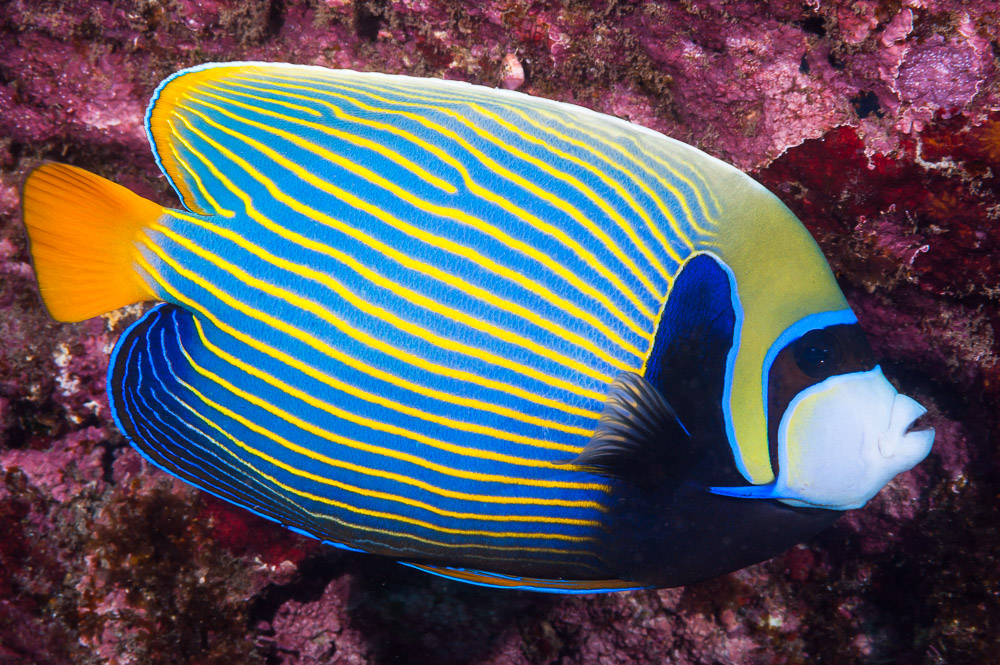
- At Reunion Island

Conservation status
- Least Concern (IUCN 3.1)

Scientific classification
- Kingdom: Animalia
- Phylum: Chordata
- Class: Actinopterygii
- Division: Teleostei
- Order: Acanthuriformes
- Family: Pomacanthidae
- Genus: Pomacanthus
- Species: P. imperator

Binomial name
- Pomacanthus imperator (Bloch, 1787)

Synonyms
- List: Chaetodon imperator Bloch, 1787; Acanthochaetodon imperator (Bloch, 1787); Holacanthus imperator (Bloch, 1787); Pomacanthodes imperator (Bloch, 1787); Chaetodon nicobariensis Bloch & Schneider, 1801; Acanthochaetodon nicobariensis (Bloch & Schneider, 1801); Holacanthus nicobariensis (Bloch & Schneider, 1801); Pomacanthus nicobariensis (Bloch & Schneider, 1801)

= Emperor angelfish =

Species of fish

The emperor angelfish (Pomacanthus imperator) is a species of marine angelfish. It is a reef-associated fish, native to the Indian and Pacific Oceans, from the Red Sea to Hawaii and the Austral Islands. This species is generally associated with stable populations and faces no major threats of extinction. It is a favorite of photographers, artists, and aquarists because of its unique, brilliant pattern of coloration.

== Taxonomy ==
The emperor angelfish was first formally described in 1787 as Chaetodon imperator by the German physician and naturalist Marcus Elieser Bloch (1723–1799) with the type locality given as Japan. Some authorities place this species in the subgenus Acanthochaetodon. The specific name imperator means "emperor" and reflects the Dutch name Keyser van Iapan meaning "Emperor of Japan" coined by the publisher Louis Renard (ca. 1678–1746) in 1719, possibly reflecting its majestic appearance.

== Distribution ==
The emperor angelfish has a wide Indo-Pacific distribution. It occurs from the Red Sea southwards along the East African coast to Mozambique and Madagascar, eastwards through the Indian and Pacific Oceans as far as the Tuamotu Islands and the Line Islands. It extends north to the Kansai region and to the southern regions of Japan and south to the Great Barrier Reef of Australia, New Caledonia and the Austral Islands in French Polynesia. Vagrants have been recorded from Hawaii. It has been recorded at several sites off the coast of Florida and off Puerto Rico, and since 2009 as a Lessepsian migrant to the eastern Mediterranean basin where it now found in low numbers in a number of localities.

== Description ==
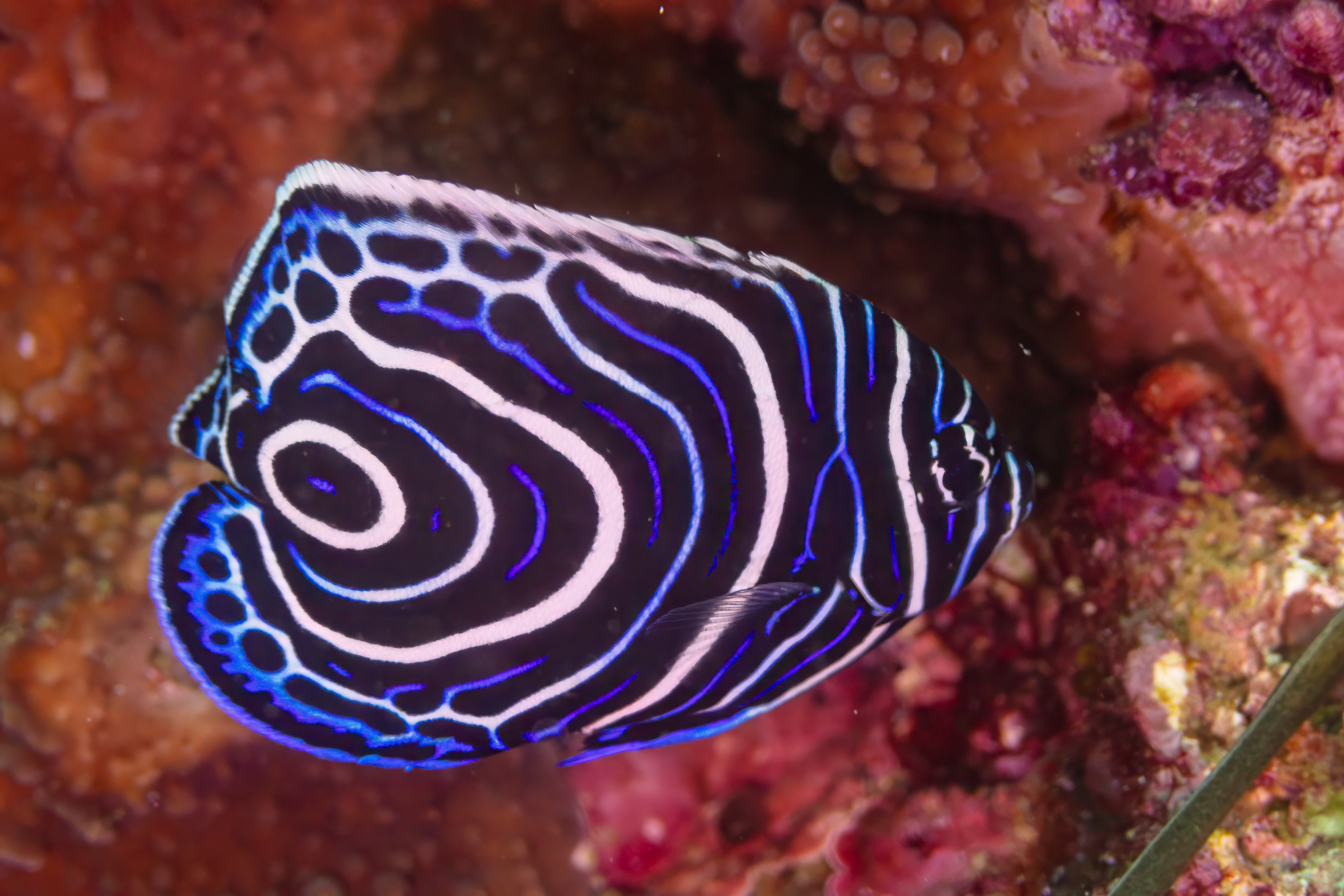
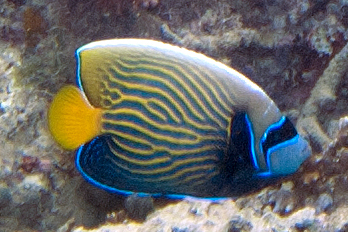
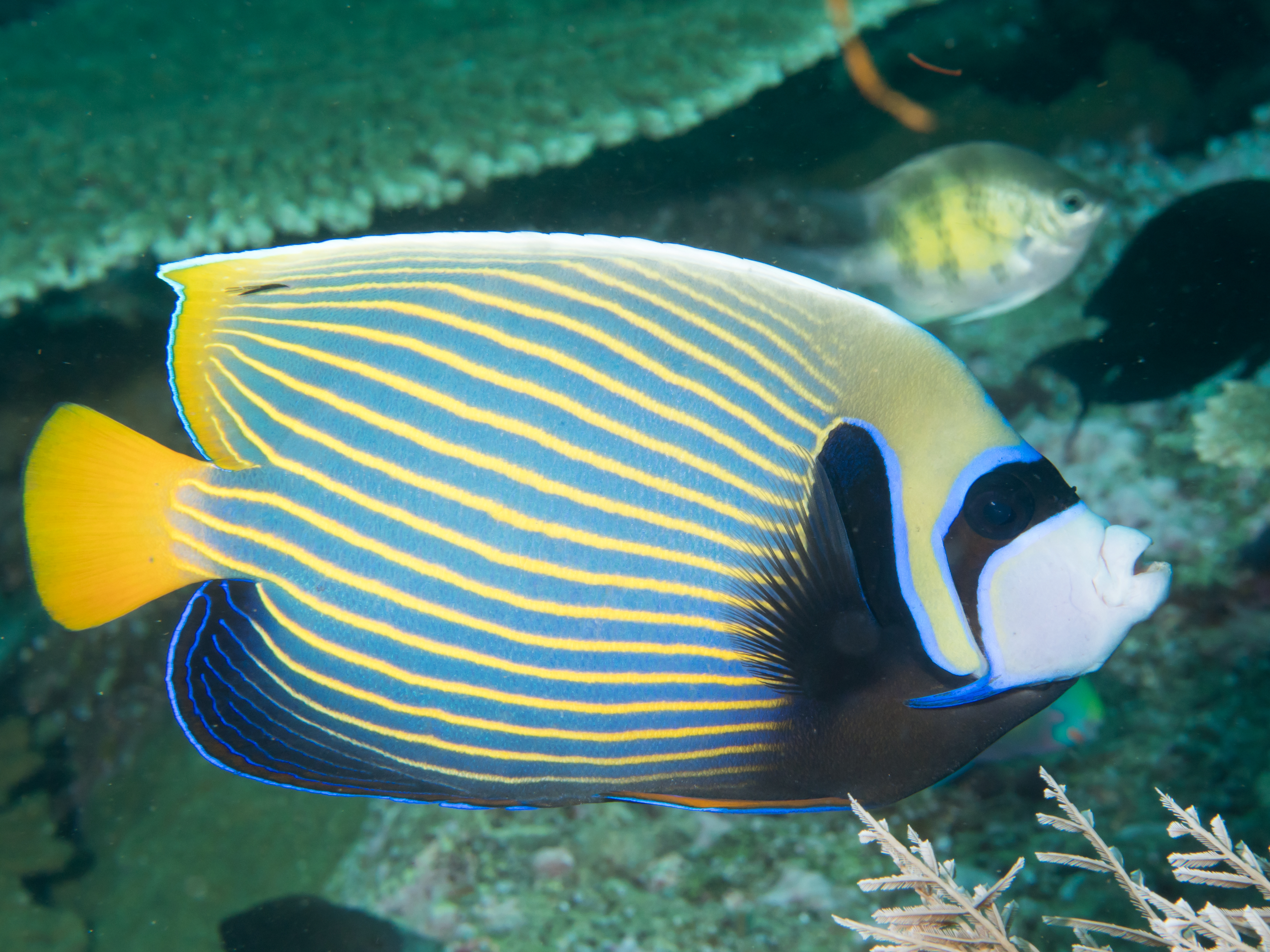
From juvenile (left) to adult (right)

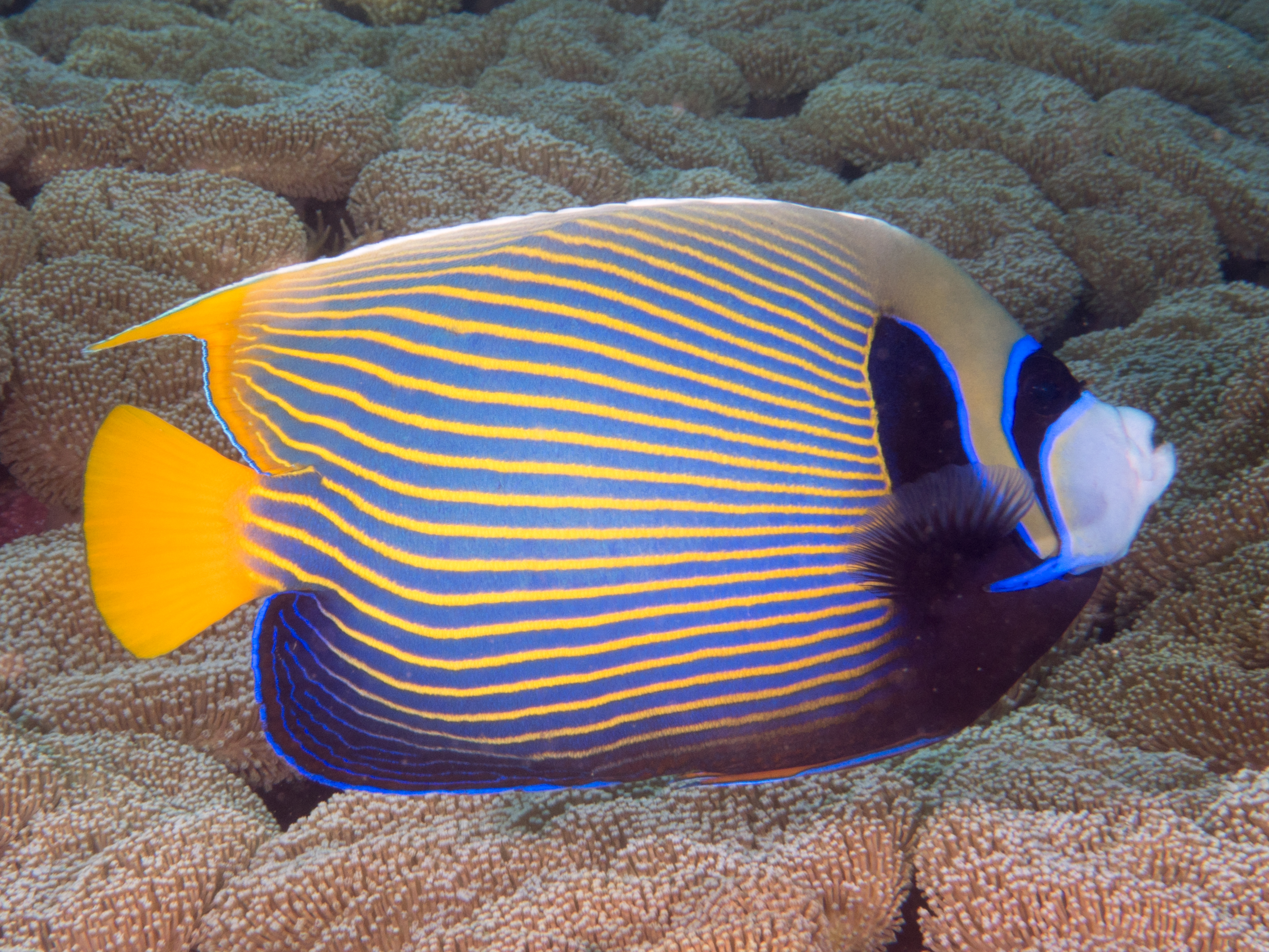
In Indonesia, with dorsal filament

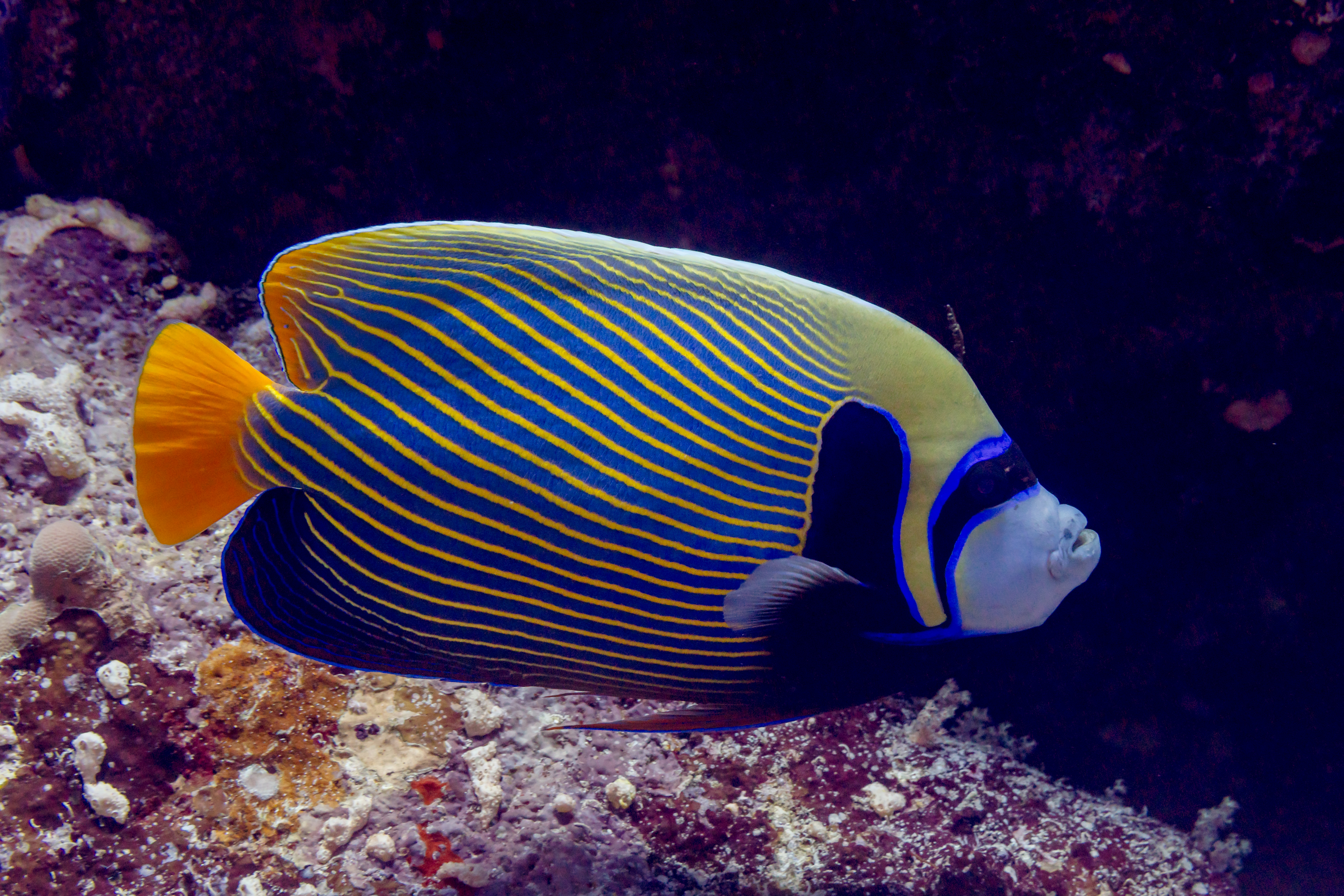
In the Red Sea, without dorsal filament

The emperor angelfish shows a marked difference between the juveniles and the adults. The juveniles have a dark blue body which is marked with concentric curving lines, alternating between pale blue and white with the smallest which are completely enclosed within each other located posteriorly. These lines become vertical at the anterior end. The dorsal fin has a white margin and the caudal fin is transparent. The adults are striped with blue and yellow horizontal stripes, a light blue face with a dark blue mask over the eyes and a yellow caudal fin. There is a blackish band above the pectoral fins, the top of which is at the level of the upper orbit. The front margin of this band is bright blue and the rear margin is a thin yellow line. The anal fin has a dark blue background with lighter blue horizontal stripes.

The dorsal fin has 13–14 spines and 17–21 soft rays while the anal fin has 3 spines and 18–21 soft rays. This species attains a maximum total length of 40 cm (16 in).

Adult individuals of the Pacific Ocean population sport a filament trailing from the rear of the dorsal fin, while this is absent in the Indian Ocean population.

== Habitat ==
The emperor angelfish is found at depths between 1 and 100 metres (3.3 and 328.1 ft). The adults are found in areas where there is a rich growth of corals on clear lagoon, channel, or seaward reefs. Here they are normally observed underneath ledges and within caves. The subadults are frequently recorded in cavities in reefs and along surge channels on seaward reefs. The juveniles frequently shelter below ledges, in reef cavities and in relatively sheltered areas in channels and over outer reef flats.

== Biology ==
Its diet comprises sponges and other encrusting organisms, as well as tunicates. They form pairs. The juveniles and adults may act as cleaner fish, cleaning ectoparasites off larger fishes. When frightened, these fish can produce a knocking sound.

== Utilisation ==
The emperor angelfish is common in the aquarium trade.

== Gallery ==
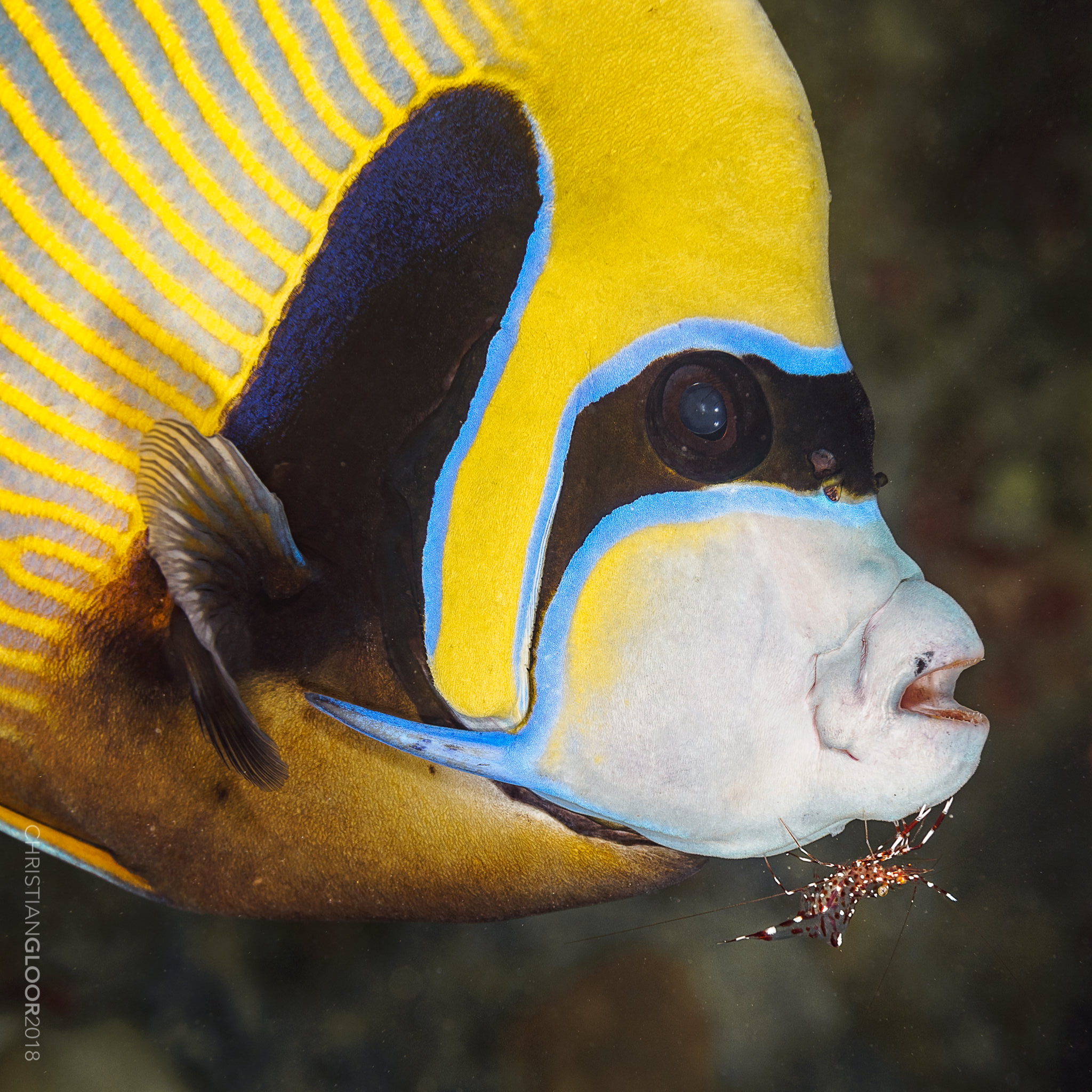
At Wakatobi National Park

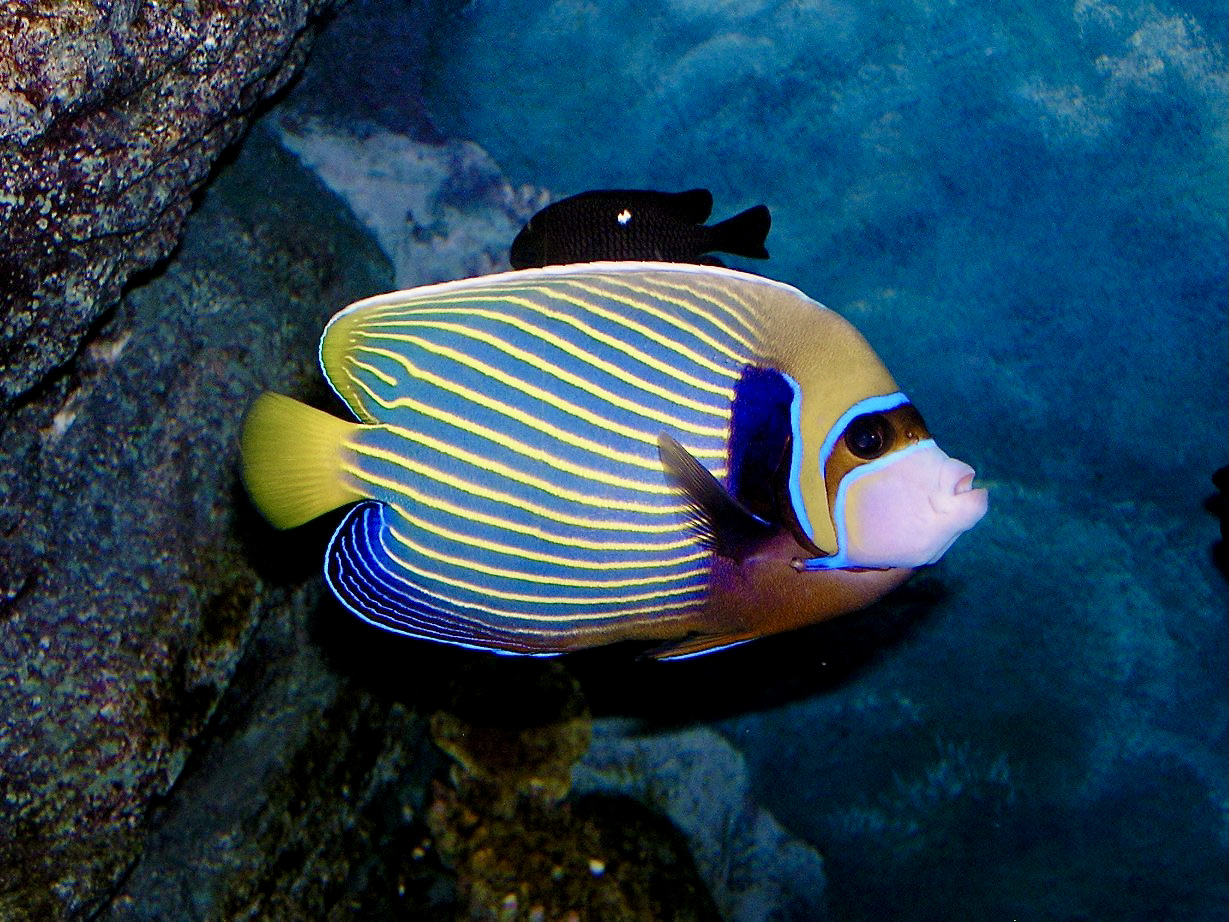
At Sea Life Bangkok Ocean World

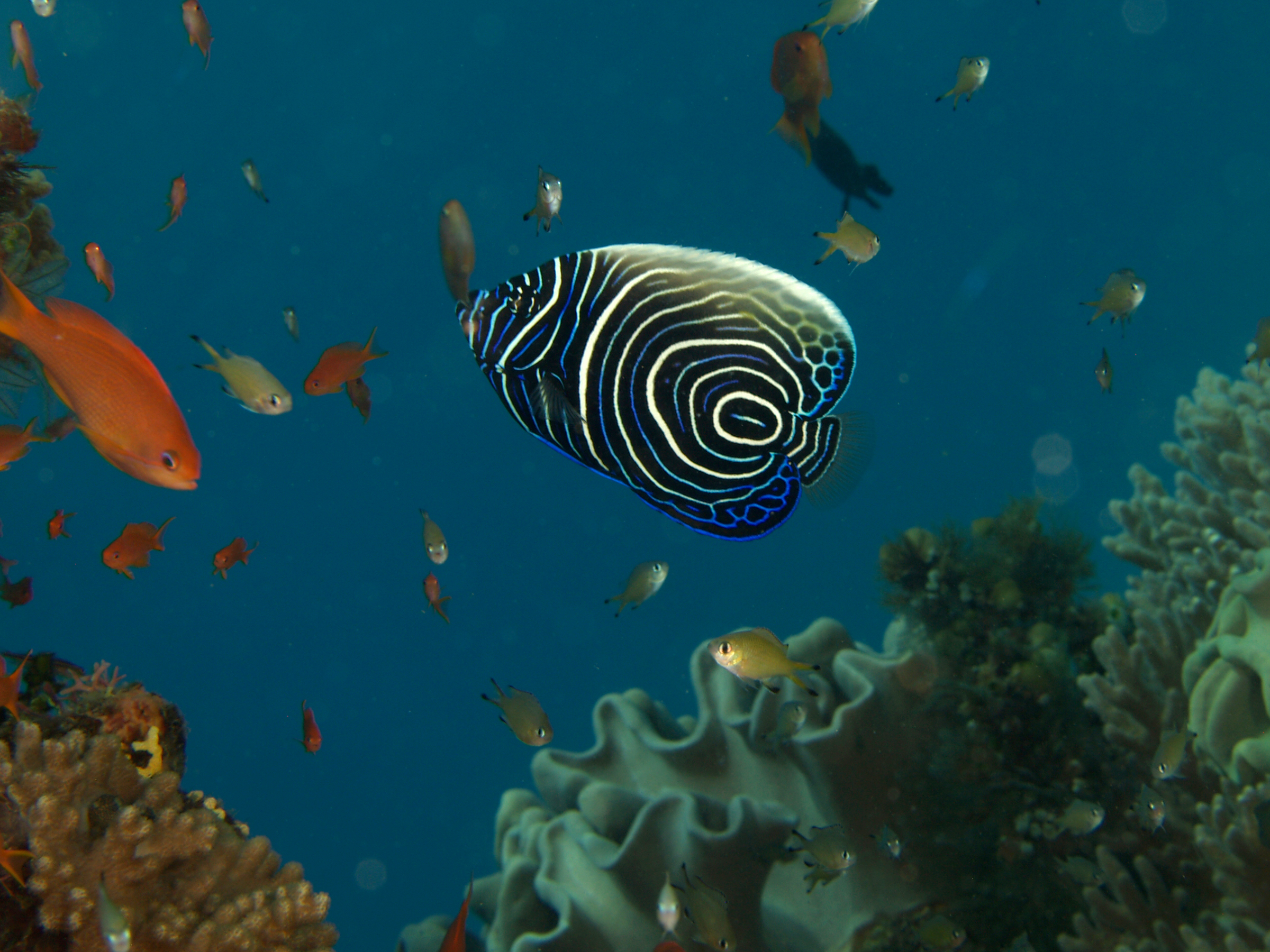
Juvenile at Manatuto Timor-Leste

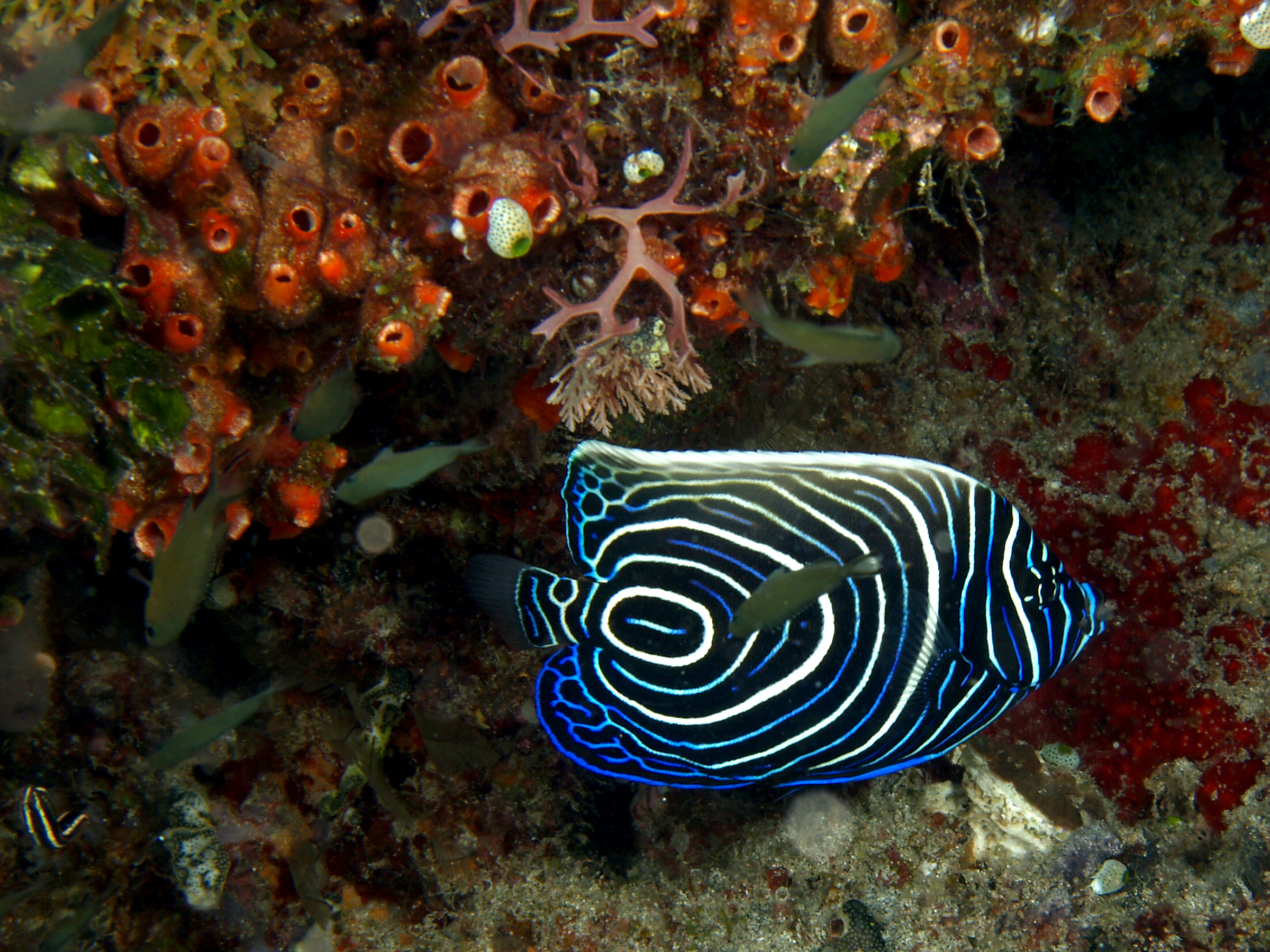
Juvenile at Manatuto Timor-Leste

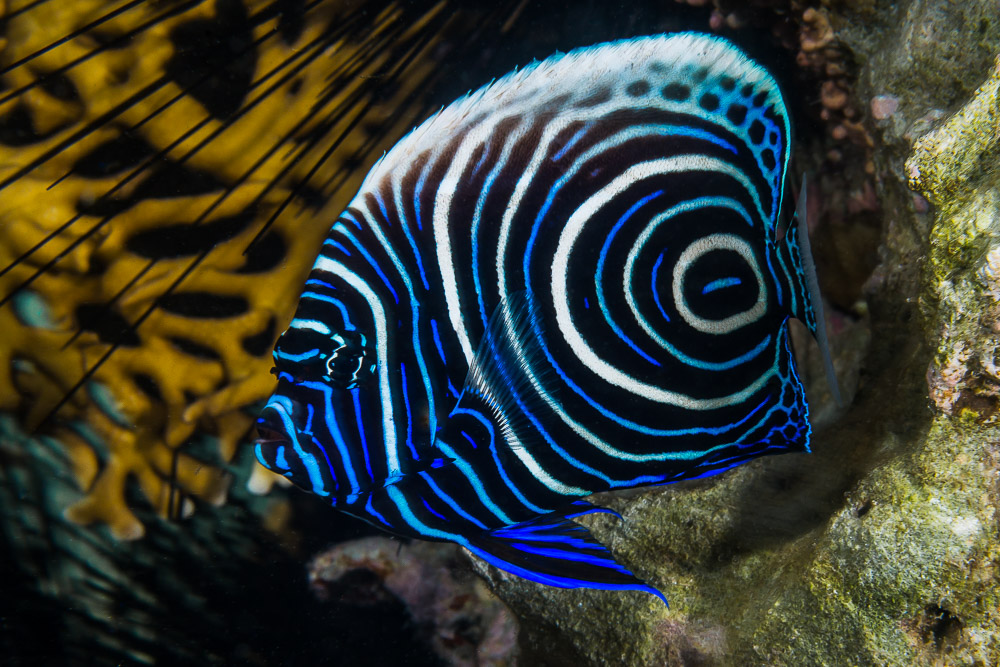
Close up of juvenile at Marsa Alam Egypt
