= Parmops coruscans =

Scientific classification
- Domain: Eukaryota
- Kingdom: Animalia
- Phylum: Chordata
- Class: Actinopterygii
- Order: Trachichthyiformes
- Family: Anomalopidae
- Genus: Parmops
- Species: P. coruscans

Binomial name
- Parmops coruscans Rosenblatt & Johnson, 1991

Species of fish

Parmops coruscans is a species of flashlight fish native to the Pacific Ocean off the coast of Tahiti and from Fiji to French Polynesia. It is one of two species of Parmops along with P. echinatus, which was discovered off the coast of Fiji. Like other anomalopids, it is notable for the light organs underneath its eyes, which contain bioluminescent bacteria. To cover the organs, it rotates them down while sliding a black lid upward over each eye. The lack of development in its shutter mechanism helps place it between Anomalops and Phthanophaneron on the evolutionary tree.

Its body is compressed and its snout is blunt, with large eyes set on either side. At 4.8 cm (1.9 in) SL in length, it is a small fish, and not a target for fisheries. Almost nothing is known about its biology or habitat. It was first described in 1991 by ichthyologists R. H. Rosenblatt and G. D. Johnson from a single specimen found at Tahiti at a depth of 350 m (1,150 ft). It was named coruscans for the Latin word meaning "sparkling," and its genus name derives from the Latin word parma meaning "a little shield" and the Greek word ops meaning "face."
