= Flashlight fish =

Flashlight fish is a common name for several fish and may refer to:

- Anomalopidae, a family known as the flashlight fishes, with many species referred to as flashlight fish, especially
  - Anomalops katoptron, from the Pacific Ocean
  - Photoblepharon palpebratum, from the eastern Indian Ocean and the Pacific
  - Photoblepharon steinitzi, from the western Indian Ocean
- Myctophidae, a family sometimes known as flashlight fishes, with some species referred to as flashlight fish
  - Electrona risso (chubby flashlight fish), found in oceans around the world
  - Protomyctophum crockeri, found in the North Pacific
  - Spotted lantern fish (Myctophum punctatum), found in deep waters of the Atlantic and Mediterranean Sea
- Stomiidae, a family with species referred to as flashlight fish
  - Photostomias, found in deep waters
