= Photoblepharon steinitzi =

Conservation status
- Least Concern (IUCN 3.1)

Scientific classification
- Kingdom: Animalia
- Phylum: Chordata
- Class: Actinopterygii
- Division: Teleostei
- Order: Trachichthyiformes
- Family: Anomalopidae
- Genus: Photoblepharon
- Species: P. steinitzi

Binomial name
- Photoblepharon steinitzi T. Abe & Haneda, 1973

Synonyms
- Photoblepharon palpebratus steinitzi Abe & Haneda, 1973

Species of fish

The flashlight fish (Photoblepharon steinitzi) is a species of anomalopid fish of the order Beryciformes. It is native to the western Indian Ocean and the Red Sea where it is found near coral reefs. It is a nocturnal predator, hiding in crevices and caves by day and emerging to feed at night. At 11.0 cm (4.3 in) in length, it is small and relatively stout. Its body is mostly solid black, with the exception of white discoloration around its pectoral fins and a lateral line of reflective scales. It is most notable for the bioluminescent organs located underneath its eyes, which it uses to find prey, evade predators, and communicate with other members of its species. Like other Beryciformes, its reproduction is oviparous. It has no commercial value, and this combined with its timid, nocturnal nature makes population sizes and trends unknown. It is listed as Least Concern by the International Union for Conservation of Nature (IUCN) due to a wide distribution and lack of known threats.

== Taxonomy and phylogeny ==
- - Anomalops
  - - Phthanophaneron
    - - Kryptophanaron
      - - - Photoblepharon palpebratum
          - Photoblepharon steinitzi

Phylogenetic tree of Anomalopidae.

The flashlight fish was first described in 1973 by ichthyologists Tokiharu Abe and Yata Haneda, who designated it a subspecies of P. palpebratum. It was reclassified as its own species in 1987 by McCosker and Rosenblatt due to morphological differences and geographic distance between location of specimens. The number of pelvic rays for P. steinitzi is 6 or 7, whereas P. palpebratum will never have 6. Another difference is that the white spot at the upper corner of the opercle in P. palpebratum is smaller and less drastically colored in P. steinitzi, and is sometimes not present at all. Its generic name comes from Greek: "photo" meaning "light" and "blepharon" meaning "eyelash."

As one of the more derived members of Anomalopidae, the flashlight fish shares several synapomorphies with P. palpebratum, Krytophaneron, and Phthanophaneron, including smaller and more numerous scales. Another characteristic which serves as evidence for the cladogram shown left is the method by which certain species "turn off" their light organs. Anomalops has evolved a more mechanically efficient rotation by which the organ is flipped down, whereas the more derived lineages make use of a shutter mechanism by which a lid extends up to cover the light organ.

== Description ==
The flashlight fish has a short, stout, darkly colored body. Its maximum recorded length is 11.0 cm (4.3 in) TL. Its blunt snout and large eyes are characteristic of its family. The pectoral fins are preceded by a white splotch and it may possess a spot of light discoloration at the top of its preopercle, though this is not always the case. This can be used to distinguish it from P. palpebratum in which the spot is larger and whiter. A line of reflective scales run the length of its body from the operculum to the caudal fins. Its most distinctive feature are the bioluminscent organs underneath its eyes, which are white, but emit a blue-green light in the dark. The flashlight fish possesses black lids which slide up to cover the light organs when desired.

== Distribution and habitat ==
The flashlight fish's range is extensive throughout the western Indian Ocean and the Red Sea. With a latitudinal range between 21°S and 45°N, it has been collected from various islands, including Réunion and Comoros, to as far east as Maldives, as well as north to Somalia, Oman, Israel, and Egypt. The typical water temperature of its habitat is 26 °C (79 °F) and salinity is generally around 35 PSU. P. steinitzi typically inhabits caves in and around coral reefs up to 500 m (1,600 ft) in depth by day, ascending to 3–20 m (9.8–65.6 ft) at night to feed.

== Biology and ecology ==
As a nocturnal predator, the flashlight fish generally spends the day hiding in caves and rock crevices. Although it has been observed to share these caves with soldierfish (Myripristinae) and squirrelfish (Holocentrinae), it displays territorial aggression towards other members of its species. Lone fish or mated pairs will defend their territory by swimming aggressively towards an intruding fish and increasing the frequency at which their light organs blink. Evasion of predators is also assisted by its light organs, as the flashlight fish can employ a "blink-and-run" strategy, swimming slowly in one direction with its lights on before blinking them off and darting erratically in another direction.

== Human interaction ==
The flashlight fish has little interaction with humans due to its nocturnal nature and lack of commercial value. It may be targeted by local fishermen for use as bait. It was initially listed as Data Deficient by the IUCN, but its status was changed to Least Concern in 2020 after an evaluation found wide geographic distribution and no major threats to its survival.
