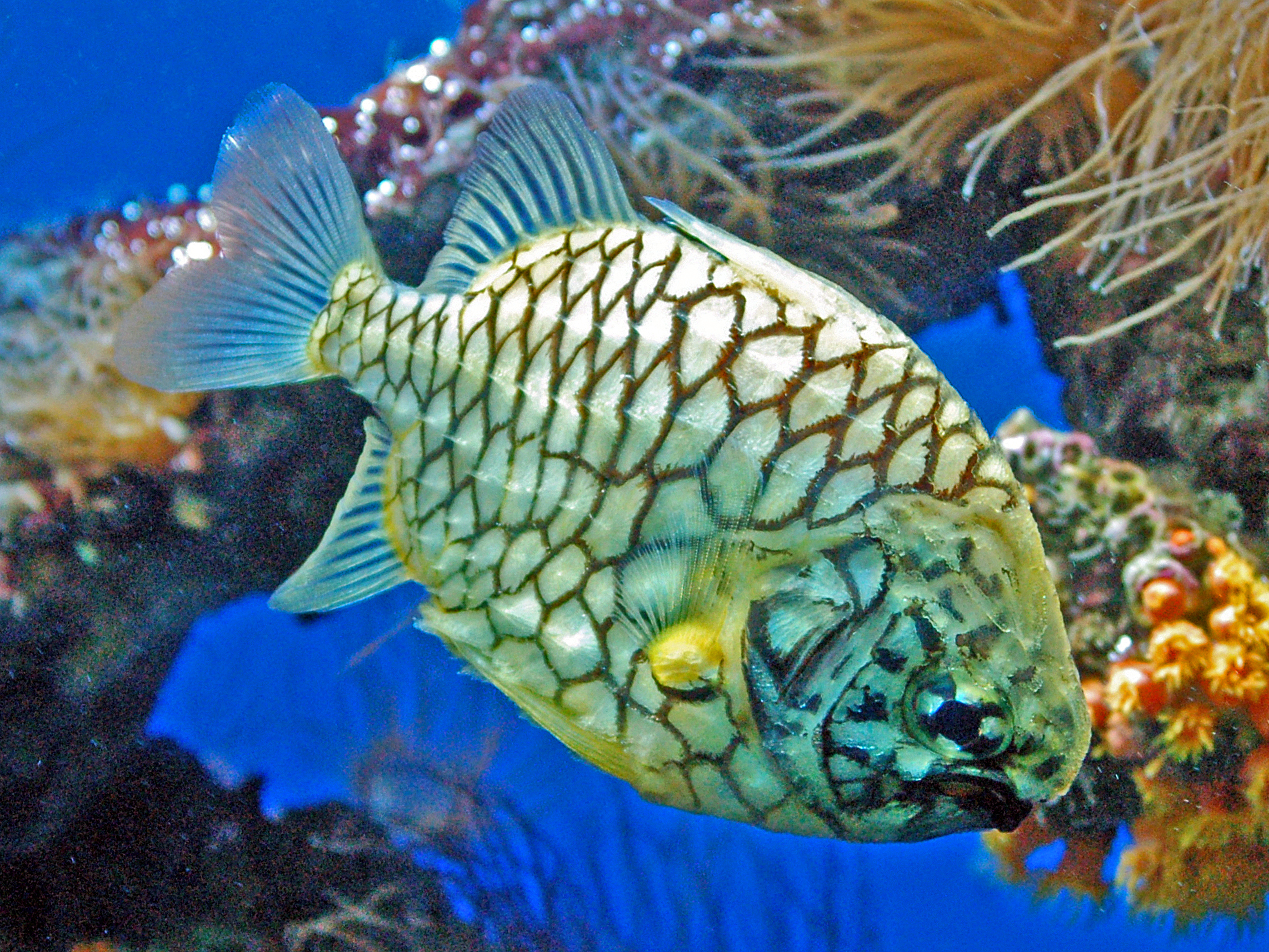
- Cleidopus gloriamaris at Monaco Aquarium

Conservation status
- Least Concern (IUCN 3.1)

Scientific classification
- Kingdom: Animalia
- Phylum: Chordata
- Class: Actinopterygii
- Division: Teleostei
- Order: Trachichthyiformes
- Family: Monocentridae
- Genus: Cleidopus; De Vis, 1882
- Species: C. gloriamaris

Binomial name
- Cleidopus gloriamaris De Vis, 1882

= Pineapplefish =

Species of fish

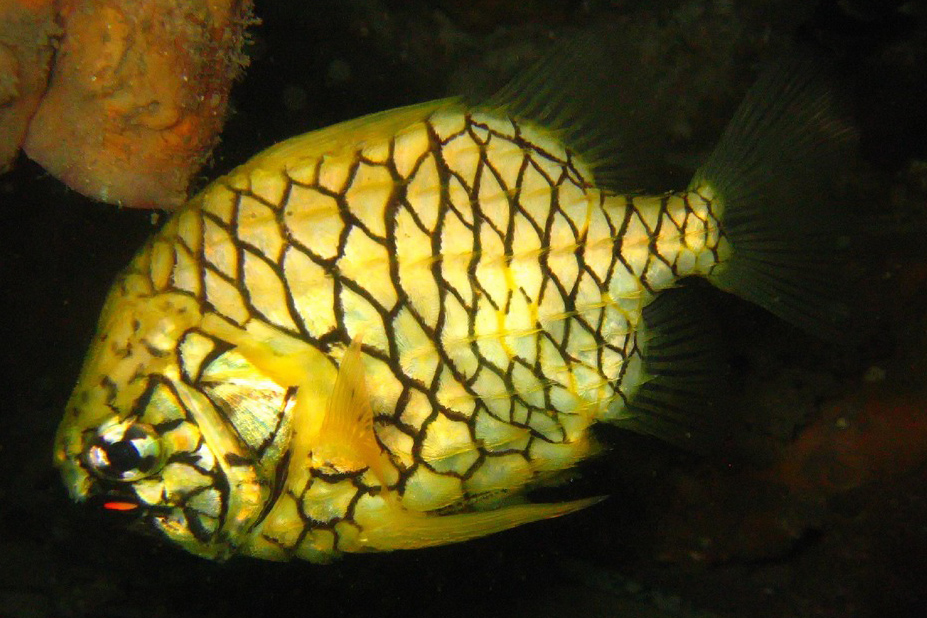
Pineapplefish off Fly Point, New South Wales

The pineapplefish (Cleidopus gloriamaris) also known as the mailfish, is a species of fish in the family Monocentridae, and the sole member of the genus Cleidopus. It is also known as the knightfish or the coat-of-mail fish, due to the armor-like scales covering its body, and the port-and-starboard light fish, as it has a pair of bioluminescent organs that are reminiscent of navigation lights on ships. Its specific epithet is from the Latin gloria and maris, meaning "glory of the sea".

== Distribution and habitat ==
The pineapplefish is native to coastal waters off Queensland, New South Wales, and Western Australia. It occurs at a depth of 6–200 meters (20–656 ft) in reefs and harbors.

== Description ==
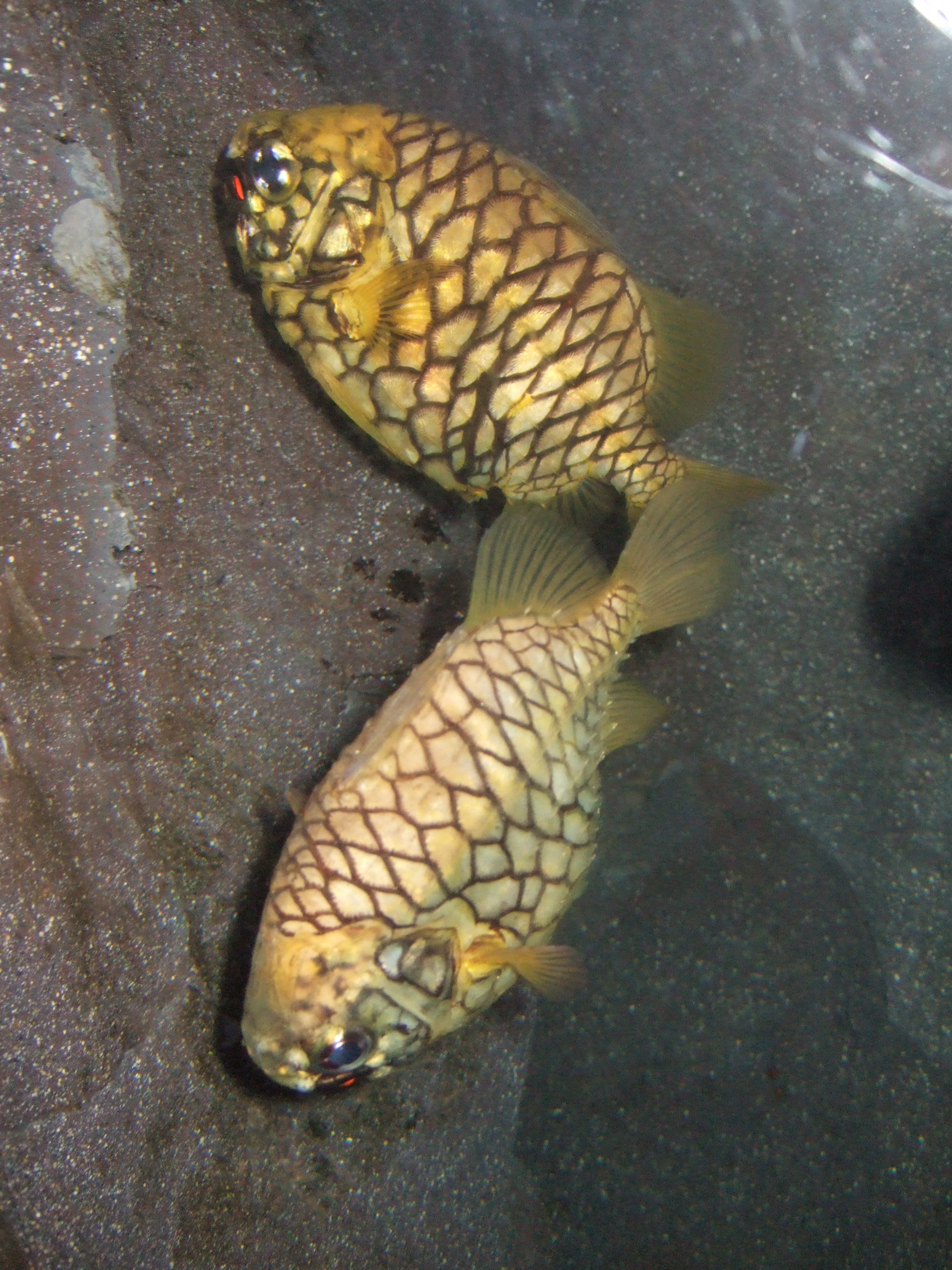
Two pineapplefish at the Sydney Aquarium

The pineapplefish grows up to 22 cm (8.7 in) long. It has a plump, rounded body almost completely covered in large, rough scales with sharp, backward-pointing spines. The head is large, with mucous pits bordered by rough ridges, and is armored with heavy bone. The snout is blunt and overhangs the wide mouth. The teeth are tiny and thin, present on the jaws, palatine, and vomer. There are two pits containing bioluminescent bacteria on the lower jaw near the corners of the mouth, which are concealed when the mouth is closed. This photophore is green in young fish and becomes more red as it ages. The first dorsal fin consists of 5–7 strong spines; the spines are free of a membrane and point alternatingly left and right. The second dorsal fin contains 12 soft rays. Each pelvic fin contains an extremely large spine, nearly as long as the head, and 3–4 rudimentary rays. The pelvic spine can be locked erect at a right angle to the body. The anal fin contains 11–12 rays and the pectoral fins 14–15 rays.

The scales of the pineapplefish are yellow to whitish with black rear margins, forming the striking pattern that gives this fish its name. The lips, chin, and parts of the jaw are black. There is a red stripe on the lower jaw running to the photophore. This species is very similar to the pinecone fishes of the genus Monocentris, and is placed within that genus by some authors. Cleidopus differs from Monocentris in having a narrow preorbital bone and in the position of its light organs, which are near the tip of the lower jaw in Monocentris. This species also differs from the Japanese pineapplefish (Monocentris japonica) in having a more rounded snout.

== Biology and ecology ==
Due to its small fins and rigid armor, the pineapplefish is a weak swimmer. A nocturnal species, it may be found inside caves and under rocky ledges during the day. In the Fly Point Halifax Park Aquatic Preserve, New South Wales, a small group of pineapplefish has been documented under the same ledge for at least seven years, and another group under a different ledge for three years. At night, this species ventures out onto sandy flats to feed, using its light organs to illuminate small shrimp. The light may also be used to communicate with conspecifics. The light of the pineapplefish is produced by symbiotic colonies of the bacteria Vibrio fischeri within its photophores. V. fischeri are also found free-living in sea water and are naturally released from the pineapplefish's photophores. However, their luminescence dims within a matter of hours after being released. This species has lived up to 10 years in captivity.

== Relationship to humans ==
The pineapplefish is moderately common in deep water, but due to its retiring nature, for some time after its initial discovery it was only known from specimens tossed ashore by storms. This fish is sometimes collected by commercial trawlers, and is popular with saltwater fish aquarists. It is fairly hardy, but must be provided with rocky hiding places and live food.

The species is not targeted by any fisheries, but is often taken as bycatch by commercial trawlers.
