= Protoblepharon rosenblatti =

Scientific classification
- Kingdom: Animalia
- Phylum: Chordata
- Class: Actinopterygii
- Order: Trachichthyiformes
- Family: Anomalopidae
- Genus: Protoblepharon
- Species: P. rosenblatti

Binomial name
- Protoblepharon rosenblatti C. C. Baldwin, G. D. Johnson & Paxton, 1997

Species of fish

Protoblepharon rosenblatti, the Cook Islands flashlightfish, is a species of flashlight fish found in the waters surrounding the Cook Islands. It can reach lengths of up to 22.0 cm (9 in) and can be found as deep as 274 m (900 ft).

== Description ==
Protoblepharon rosenblatti was first described in 1997 by Carole C. Baldwin, G. David Johnson and John Richard Paxton and named in honour of the American ichthyologist Richard H. Rosenblatt, an expert on the Anomalopidae. The type specimen was brought to the surface by hook and line from a depth of 274 m (900 ft) at Rarotonga in the Cook Islands. It has a standard length of 23 cm (9 in). The body is deep and laterally compressed, being nearly twice as deep as it is wide. The dorsal fin has 7 spines and 14 soft rays, and the anal fin, 2 spines and 11 soft rays. The eyes are small and there is a small light organ just underneath each eye. This is located on a short stalk and is capable of being rotated downwards so that it is concealed in a pocket which has a stretchable black shutter membrane.

== Biology ==
The light organ underneath the eye of the fish contains bioluminescent symbiotic bacteria and glows with a strong bluish-green light. It glows all the time, but the flashlight fish can turn it on and off by concealing it in the pocket below the organ which has a black shutter mechanism. The fish are nocturnal, hiding during the day in caves and dark places at depths of several hundred metres. At night they ascend to near the surface and use the organs to attract their prey, zooplankton, and they also feed on the small fish that are lured by the light to feed on the plankton. The organs are also used by the flashlight fish to confuse their predators; the flashlight fish can dart away and zigzag repeatedly while alternately displaying and concealing the light.
