= Deep sea =

Lowest layer in the ocean

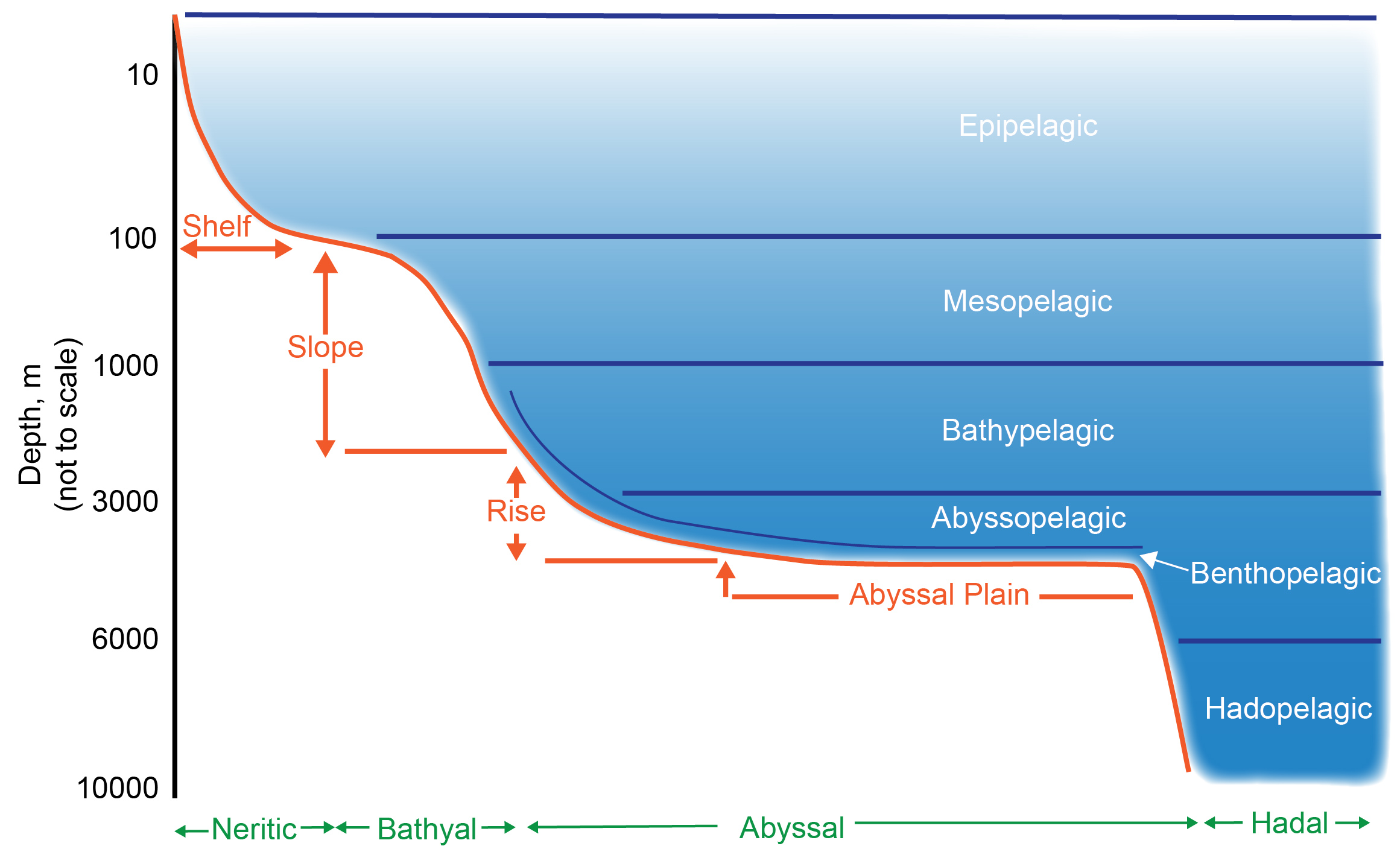
Schematic representation of pelagic and benthic zones

The deep sea is broadly defined as the ocean depth where light begins to fade, at an approximate depth of 200 m (660 ft) or the point of transition from continental shelves to continental slopes. Conditions within the deep sea are a combination of low temperatures, darkness, and high pressure. The deep sea is considered the least explored Earth biome as the extreme conditions make the environment difficult to access and explore.

Organisms living within the deep sea have a variety of adaptations to survive in these conditions. Organisms can survive in the deep sea through a number of feeding methods including scavenging, predation and filtration, with a number of organisms surviving by feeding on marine snow. Marine snow is organic material that has fallen from upper waters into the deep sea.

In 1960, the bathyscaphe Trieste descended to the bottom of the Mariana Trench near Guam, at 10,911 m (35,797 ft; 6.780 mi), the deepest known spot in any ocean. If Mount Everest (8,848 m or 29,029 ft or 5.498 mi) were submerged there, its peak would be more than 2 km (1.2 mi) beneath the surface. After the Trieste was retired, the Japanese remote-operated vehicle (ROV) Kaikō was the only vessel capable of reaching this depth until it was lost at sea in 2003. In May and June 2009, the hybrid-ROV Nereus returned to the Challenger Deep for a series of three dives to depths exceeding 10,900 m (35,800 ft; 6.8 mi).

== Environmental characteristics ==
=== Light ===
Natural light does not penetrate the deep ocean, with the exception of the upper parts of the mesopelagic. Since photosynthesis is not possible, plants and phytoplankton cannot live in this zone, and as these are the primary producers of almost all of earth's ecosystems, life in this area of the ocean must depend on energy sources from elsewhere. Except for the areas close to the hydrothermal vents, this energy comes from organic material drifting down from the photic zone. The sinking organic material is composed of algal particulates, detritus, and other forms of biological waste, which is collectively referred to as marine snow.

=== Pressure ===
Because pressure in the ocean increases by about 1 atmosphere for every 10 meters of depth, the amount of pressure experienced by many marine organisms is extreme. Until recent years, the scientific community lacked detailed information about the effects of pressure on most deep sea organisms because the specimens encountered arrived at the surface dead or dying and weren't observable at the pressures at which they lived. With the advent of traps that incorporate a special pressure-maintaining chamber, undamaged larger metazoan animals have been retrieved from the deep sea in good condition.

=== Salinity ===
Salinity is remarkably constant throughout the deep sea, at about 35 parts per thousand. There are some minor differences in salinity, but none that are ecologically significant, except in largely landlocked seas like the Mediterranean and Red Seas.

=== Temperature ===
The two areas of greatest temperature gradient in the oceans are the transition zone between the surface waters and the deep waters, the thermocline, and the transition between the deep-sea floor and the hot water flows at the hydrothermal vents. Thermoclines vary in thickness from a few hundred meters to nearly a thousand meters. Below the thermocline, the water mass of the deep ocean is cold and far more homogeneous. Thermoclines are strongest in the tropics, where the temperature of the epipelagic zone is usually above 20 °C (68 °F). From the base of the epipelagic, the temperature drops over several hundred meters to 5–6 °C at 1,000 meters (41–43 °F at 3,300 ft). It continues to decrease to the bottom, but the rate is much slower. The cold water stems from sinking heavy surface water in the polar regions.

At any given depth, the temperature is practically unvarying over long periods of time, without seasonal changes and with very little interannual variability. No other habitat on earth has such a constant temperature.

In hydrothermal vents the temperature of the water as it emerges from the "black smoker" chimneys may be as high as 400 °C (752 °F), being kept from boiling by the high hydrostatic pressure – thus being superheated water. The temperature may back down to 2 to 4 °C (36 to 39 °F) within a few meters.

== Biology ==
Regions below the epipelagic are divided into further zones, beginning with the bathyal zone (also considered the continental slope) which spans from 200 to 3,000 meters (660 to 9,840 ft) below sea level and is essentially transitional, containing elements from both the shelf above and the abyss below. Below this zone, the deep sea consists of the abyssal zone (ocean depth between 3–6 km; 1.9–3.7 mi) and the hadal zone (6–11 km; 3.7–6.8 mi). Food consists of falling organic matter known as 'marine snow' and carcasses derived from the productive zone above, and is scarce both in terms of spatial and temporal distribution.

Instead of relying on gas for their buoyancy, many deep-sea species have jelly-like flesh consisting mostly of glycosaminoglycans, which provides them with very low density. It is also common among deep water squid to combine the gelatinous tissue with a flotation chamber filled with a coelomic fluid made up of the metabolic waste product ammonium chloride, which is lighter than the surrounding water.

The midwater fish have special adaptations to cope with these conditions—they are small, usually being under 25 centimetres (10 in); they have slow metabolisms and unspecialized diets, preferring to sit and wait for food rather than waste energy searching for it. They have elongated bodies with weak, watery muscles and skeletal structures. They often have extendable, hinged jaws with recurved teeth. Because of the sparse distribution and lack of light, finding a partner with which to breed is difficult, and many organisms are hermaphroditic.

Because light is so scarce, fish often have larger than normal, tubular eyes with only rod cells. Their upward field of vision allows them to seek out the silhouette of possible prey. Prey fish however also have adaptations to cope with predation. These adaptations are mainly concerned with reduction of silhouettes, a form of camouflage. The two main methods by which this is achieved are reduction in the area of their shadow by lateral compression of the body, and counter illumination via bioluminescence. This is achieved by production of light from ventral photophores, which tend to produce such light intensity to render the underside of the fish of similar appearance to the background light. For more sensitive vision in low light, some fish have a retroreflector behind the retina. Flashlight fish have this plus photophores, which combination they use to detect eyeshine in other fish (see tapetum lucidum).

Organisms in the deep sea are almost entirely reliant upon sinking living and dead organic matter which falls at approximately 100 meters per day. In addition, only about 1 to 3% of the production from the surface reaches the seabed, mostly in the form of marine snow. This ends up accumulating on the benthic floor, around 1 cm every 1,000 years. Larger food falls, such as whale carcasses, also occur and studies have shown that these may happen more often than currently believed. There are many scavengers that feed primarily or entirely upon large food falls and the distance between whale carcasses is estimated to only be 8 kilometers. In addition, there are a number of filter feeders that feed upon organic particles using tentacles, such as Freyella elegans.

Marine bacteriophages play an important role in cycling nutrients in deep sea sediments. They are extremely abundant (between 5×10^{12} and 1×10^{13} phages per square meter) in sediments around the world.

Despite being so isolated, deep sea organisms have still been harmed by human interaction with the oceans. The London Convention aims to protect the marine environment from dumping of wastes such as sewage sludge and radioactive waste. A study found that at one region there had been a decrease in deep sea coral from 2007 to 2011, with the decrease being attributed to global warming and ocean acidification, and biodiversity estimated as being at the lowest levels in 58 years. Ocean acidification is particularly harmful to deep sea corals because they are made of aragonite, an easily soluble carbonate, and because they are particularly slow growing and will take years to recover. Deep sea trawling is also harming the biodiversity by destroying deep sea habitats which can take years to form. Another human activity that has altered deep sea biology is mining. One study found that at one mining site fish populations had decreased at six months and at three years, and that after twenty six years populations had returned to the same levels as prior to the disturbance.

=== Chemosynthesis ===
There are a number of species that do not primarily rely upon dissolved organic matter for their food. These species and communities are found at hydrothermal vents at sea-floor spreading zones. One example is the symbiotic relationship between the tube worm Riftia and chemosynthetic bacteria. It is this chemosynthesis that supports the complex communities that can be found around hydrothermal vents. These complex communities are one of the few ecosystems on the planet that do not rely upon sunlight for their supply of energy.

=== Adaptation to hydrostatic pressure ===
Deep-sea fish have different adaptations in their proteins, anatomical structures, and metabolic systems to survive in the Deep sea, where the inhabitants have to withstand great amount of hydrostatic pressure. While other factors like food availability and predator avoidance are important, the deep-sea organisms must have the ability to maintain well-regulated metabolic system in the face of high pressures. In order to adjust for the extreme environment, these organisms have developed unique characteristics.

Proteins are affected greatly by the elevated hydrostatic pressure, as they undergo changes in water organization during hydration and dehydration reactions of the binding events. This is due to the fact that most enzyme-ligand interactions form through charged or polar non-charge interactions. Because hydrostatic pressure affects both protein folding and assembly and enzymatic activity, the deep sea species must undergo physiological and structural adaptations to preserve protein functionality against pressure.

Actin is a protein that is essential for different cellular functions. The α-actin serves as a main component for muscle fiber, and it is highly conserved across numerous different species. Some Deep-sea fish developed pressure tolerance through the change in mechanism of their α-actin. In some species that live in depths greater than 5 km (3.1 mi), C.armatus and C.yaquinae have specific substitutions on the active sites of α-Actin, which serves as the main component of muscle fiber. These specific substitutions, Q137K and V54A from C.armatus or I67P from C.yaquinae are predicted to have importance in pressure tolerance. Substitution in the active sites of actin result in significant changes in the salt bridge patterns of the protein, which allows for better stabilization in ATP binding and sub unit arrangement, confirmed by the free energy analysis and molecular dynamics simulation. It was found that deep sea fish have more salt bridges in their actins compared to fish inhabiting the upper zones of the sea.

In relations to protein substitution, specific osmolytes were found to be abundant in deep sea fish under high hydrostatic pressure. For certain chondrichthyans, it was found that Trimethylamine N-oxide (TMAO) increased with depth, replacing other osmolytes and urea. Due to the ability of TMAO being able to protect proteins from high hydrostatic pressure destabilizing proteins, the osmolyte adjustment serves are an important adaptation for deep sea fish to withstand high hydrostatic pressure.

Deep-sea organisms possess molecular adaptations to survive and thrive in the deep oceans. Mariana hadal snailfish developed modification in the Osteocalcin(burlap) gene, where premature termination of the gene was found. Osteocalcin gene regulates bone development and tissue mineralization, and the frameshift mutation seems to have resulted in the open skull and cartilage-based bone formation. Due to high hydrostatic pressure in the deep sea, closed skulls that organisms living on the surface develop cannot withstand the enforcing stress. Similarly, common bone developments seen in surface vertebrates cannot maintain their structural integrity under constant high pressure.

== Exploration ==
It has been suggested that more is known about the Moon than the deepest parts of the ocean. This is a common misconception based on a 1953 statement by George E.R. Deacon published in the Journal of Navigation, and largely refers to the scarce amount of seafloor bathymetry available at the time. The similar idea that more people have stood on the moon than have been to the deepest part of the ocean is likewise dubious.

Describing the operation and use of an autonomous lander (RV Kaharoa) in deep-sea research; the fish seen is the abyssal grenadier (Coryphaenoides armatus).

Still, the deep-sea remains one of the least explored regions on planet Earth. Pressures even in the mesopelagic become too great for traditional exploration methods, demanding alternative approaches for deep-sea research. Baited camera stations, small crewed submersibles, and ROVs (remotely operated vehicles) are three methods utilized to explore the ocean's depths. Because of the difficulty and cost of exploring this zone, current knowledge is limited. Pressure increases at approximately one atmosphere for every 10 meters meaning that some areas of the deep sea can reach pressures of above 1,000 atmospheres. This not only makes great depths very difficult to reach without mechanical aids, but also provides a significant difficulty when attempting to study any organisms that may live in these areas as their cell chemistry will be adapted to such vast pressures.

== See also ==
- Deep ocean water – Cold, salty water deep below the surface of Earth's oceans
- Submarine landslide – Landslides that transport sediment across the continental shelf and into the deep ocean
- The Blue Planet – 2001 British nature documentary television series
  - Blue Planet II – 2017 British nature documentary television series
- Nepheloid layer – Layer of water in deep sea
- Biogenous ooze
