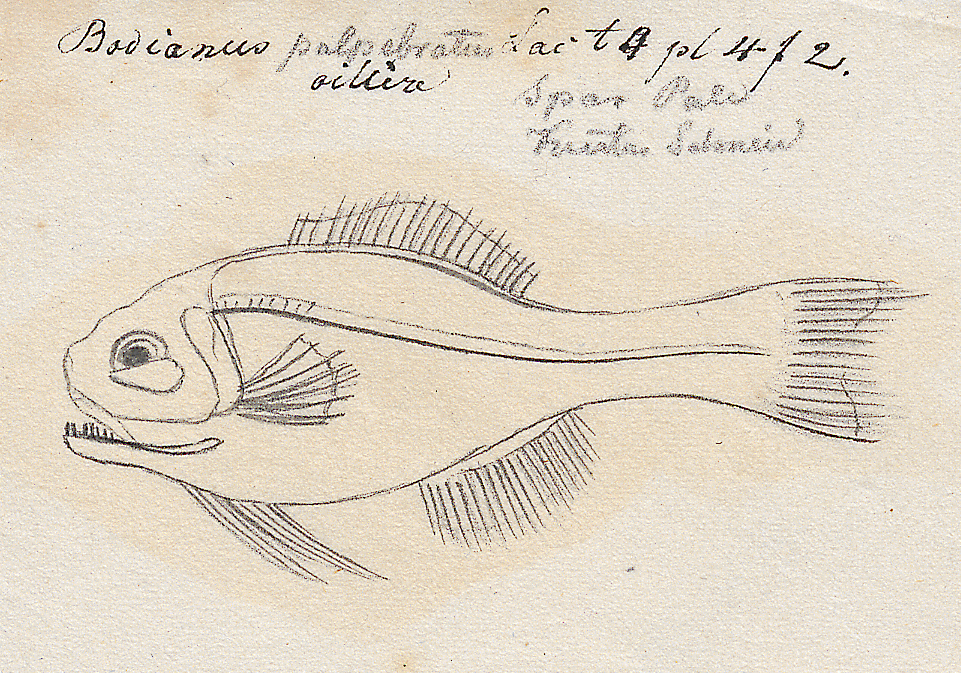

Conservation status
- Least Concern (IUCN 3.1)

Scientific classification
- Kingdom: Animalia
- Phylum: Chordata
- Class: Actinopterygii
- Order: Trachichthyiformes
- Family: Anomalopidae
- Genus: Photoblepharon
- Species: P. palpebratum

Binomial name
- Photoblepharon palpebratum (Boddaert, 1781)

Synonyms
- Photoblepharon palpebratus (Boddaert, 1781); Sparus palpebratus Boddaert, 1781

= Photoblepharon palpebratum =

Species of fish

Photoblepharon palpebratum (Syn. P. palpebratus), the eyelight fish or one-fin flashlightfish, is a species of saltwater anomalopid fish of the order Beryciformes. It is native to the western and central Pacific Ocean where it is found along seaward reefs close to the ocean floor, usually near rocks and corals it can use as cover. At only 12.0 cm (4.7 in) in length, it is a small fish, and more stout than other members of its family. Its body is mostly black, with a line of reflective scales running the length of its body and a distinguishing white spot at the upper corner of its preopercle. Its most notable features are its subocular bioluminescent organs which it likely uses to attract and find prey, confuse predators, and communicate with other fish. These organs are blinked on and off by the fish using a dark lid that slides up to cover them.

The eyelight fish is a nocturnal predator, spending the day hidden in caves and crevices in the rock, and emerging at night to search for food. It generally hunts in large groups away from the reef. Like other members of Animalopidae, reproduction is oviparous. Mated pairs spawn near the ocean surface and females can produce as many as 1,000 eggs per cycle. It is of little commercial value, its only real use being as bait for local fishermen. The eyelight fish has been displayed in public aquariums. It is listed as Least Concern by the International Union for Conservation of Nature (IUCN) due to an extensive range and lack of threats.

== Taxonomy and phylogeny ==
The first scientific description of the eyelight fish was authored by Dutch naturalist Pieter Boddaert in his 1781 piece, Beschreibung zweier merkwürdiger Fische, part of the larger volume Neue Nordische Beyträge zur physikalischen und geographischen Erd- und Völkerbeschreibung, Naturgeschichte und Oekonomie, 2 by German zoologist Peter Simon Pallas. He named the species Sparus palpebratus, its generic name being the Latin word "sparus" meaning "a fish with a golden head." It was later assigned to the genus "Photoblepharon" by German-Dutch zoologist Max Carl Wilhelm Weber in 1902. Its current genus name derives from Greek: "photo" meaning "light" and "blepharon" meaning "eyelash." Its congener, P. steinitzi, was originally classified as a subspecies of this fish, P. palpebratus steinitzi. It was reclassified as its own species in 1987 by ichthyologists John E. McCosker and Richard H. Rosenblatt.

- - Anomalops
  - - Phthanophaneron
    - - Kryptophanaron
      - - - Photoblepharon palpebratum
          - Photoblepharon steinitzi

Phylogenetic tree of Anomalopidae.

The eyelight fish is considered one of the more derived members of Anomalopidae, most closely related to Krypotophaneron with the exception of P. steinitzi. Its reflective lateral-line scales are shared by Kryptophaneron and Phthanophaneron, but are enlarged for only Kryptophanaraon and Photoblepharon, indicating that they are a unique trait of the two. Refinement of the shutter mechanism down the cladogram is further confirmation of its placement of genera.

== Description ==
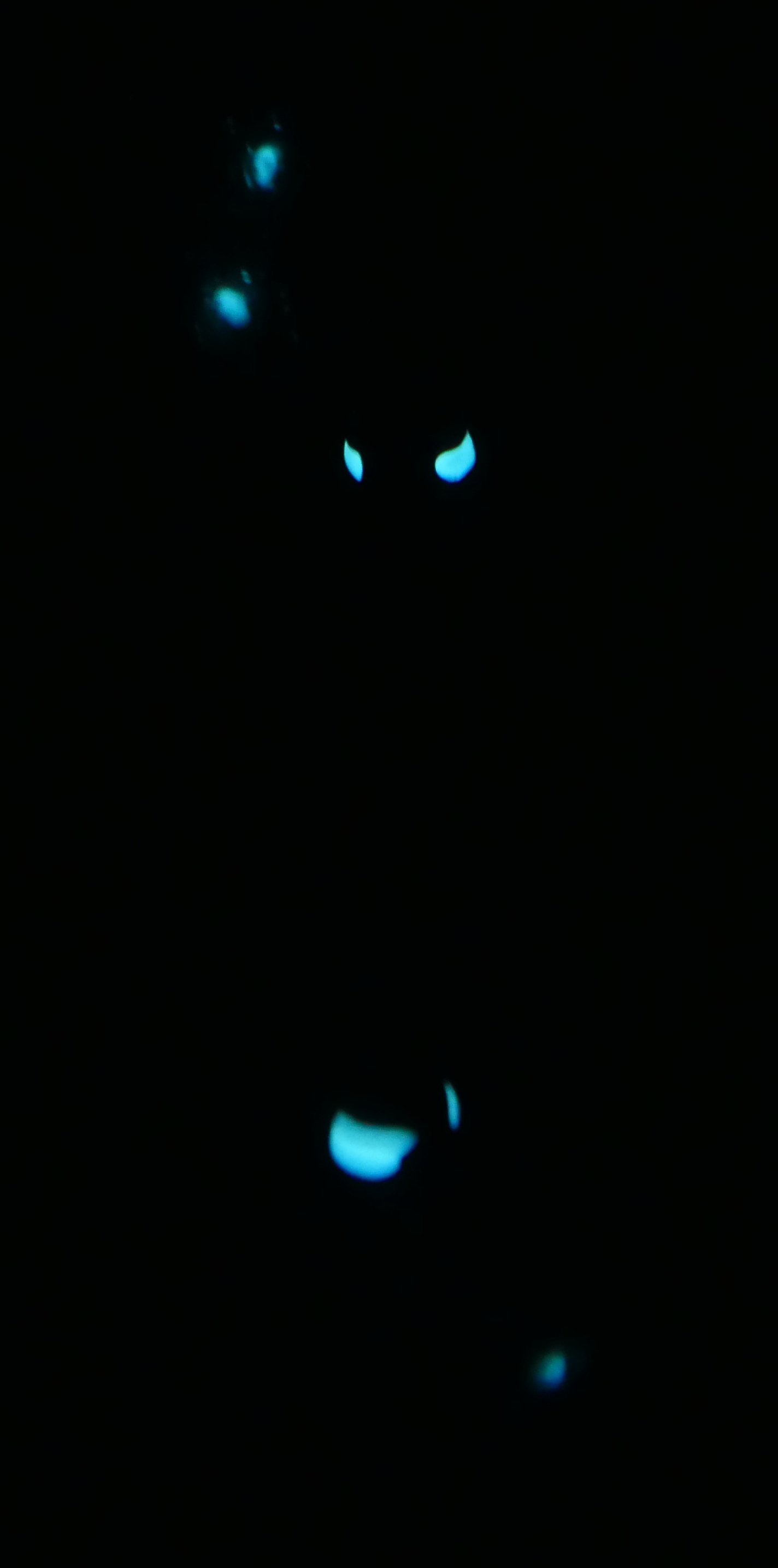
Photoblepharon palpebratum in the dark.

The eyelight fish is a small, dark fish, with a relatively stout body for an anomalopid. It has a blunt snout, large eyes, and prominent subocular light organs. It has a single dorsal fin and no adipose fins. It has 2–3 dorsal spines, 16–20 dorsal rays, 2 anal spines, and 13–15 anal soft rays. Most of its body is black, but it is marked by a distinct white spot at the upper corner of its preopercle, as well as by a lateral line of reflective scales and white scales in front of its pectoral fins. Its maximum length is 12.0 cm (4.7 in), making it one of the smaller members of its family.

It is distinguished from its congener, P. steinitzi, in a number of ways, one indicator being the white spot on its preopercle. P. steinitzi has either no white spot or a smaller, darker spot, as well as more ornamented head bones.

Its most distinguishing features are the cream-colored light organs underneath its eyes, which produce blue-green light likely used by the fish to attract prey, communicate with other fish, and frighten and confuse predators. These organs contain bioluminescent bacteria, fed by oxygen and nutrients from the fish's bloodstream, which emit a constant light. The eyelight fish uses a black lid to cover the organs when it does not want to emit light.

== Distribution and habitat ==
The eyelight fish has a wide range in the western and central Pacific Ocean, from the Philippines in the west to the Society Islands in the east, as well as south to New Caledonia. Its latitudinal range is between 19°N and 24°S. It was originally thought to be found only in Indonesia, but has since been seen near Guam and caught off the coasts of Australia, the Marshall Islands, the Caroline Islands, the Cook Islands, and Papua New Guinea. Because its nocturnal habits make sightings and collections uncommon, the extent of its range is not fully understood, and likely contains other localities.

It lives in or near seaward reefs with steep drop-offs and caves, and is generally found alone or in pairs. When hunting it remains close to the ocean floor. Its preferred water temperatures are between 18 and 29 °C (64 and 84 °F). It is usually seen by humans no deeper than 15 m (49 ft), but its depth range extends as far as 50 m (160 ft) below the surface.

== Biology and ecology ==
The eyelight fish spends the day hidden in caves and crevices and emerges at night to feed, generally in large groups away from the reef. Its primary food source is likely crustaceans it finds or attracts with its light organs. Like other anomalopids, the eyelight fish's reproduction is oviparous. Mated pairs spawn near the water's surface. Each female can lay up to around 1,000 eggs per spawning. These eggs go through a brief planktonic phase before attaching to a nearby surface. Within a day, eggs turn milky white and sink to the substrate. Spawning has been documented in the early months of April and May, though it is likely the fish spawns at other times during the year as well.

The symbiotic bacteria in its light organs differ substantially from the bacteria found in other anomalopids. Some bacteria are released from its light organs and remain viable after being discharged, but cease to emit light shortly thereafter. To shut off the light, the eyelight fish uses black lids that slide up to cover the light organs. Use of only a black lid is unique to Photoblepharon; the other members of its family either rotate the organ into a pouch or employ a pouch-and-shutter method.

== Human interactions ==
The eyelight fish has little interaction with humans. Besides being harmless, it spends the day hidden in rock crevices and so is rarely encountered by divers. It has little commercial value, its primary use being as bait for local fisheries, which will cut out the light organs and attach them to hooks. Previously listed as Data Deficient by the IUCN, in 2020 the eyelight fish was updated to Least Concern because of its extensive distribution and lack of major threats.
