= Protoblepharon mccoskeri =

Scientific classification
- Kingdom: Animalia
- Phylum: Chordata
- Class: Actinopterygii
- Division: Teleostei
- Order: Trachichthyiformes
- Family: Anomalopidae
- Genus: Protoblepharon
- Species: P. mccoskeri

Binomial name
- Protoblepharon mccoskeri H. C. Ho & G. D. Johnson, 2012

Species of fish

Protoblepharon mccoskeri, the Taiwanese flashlight fish, is a flashlight fish species found in the Northwest Pacific off of Taiwan's east coast. It can be found as deep as 300m. It was first described in 2012 from a single specimen caught near Taiwan.

== Taxonomy ==
The first scientific description of the Taiwanese flashlight fish was authored in 2012 by ichthyologists Hsuan-Ching Ho and G. David Johnson. Its generic name derives from Greek protos, meaning "the first," and blepharon, meaning "eyelid." The species is named mccoskeri after Dr. John E. McCosker, a senior scientist at the California Academy of Sciences.

== Description ==
The Taiwanese flashlight fish has a thick body and relatively small, bulging eyes. Its head has very few scales. It differs from P. rosenblatti, its only congener in that it has a deeper body, shorter snout, smaller light organ, and larger cup under the eye. There are about 260 rows of scales along its body. It is a reddish black color and can reach lengths of up to 30.5 cm.
