= Monocentris reedi =

Conservation status
- Least Concern (IUCN 3.1)

Scientific classification
- Kingdom: Animalia
- Phylum: Chordata
- Class: Actinopterygii
- Order: Trachichthyiformes
- Family: Monocentridae
- Genus: Monocentris
- Species: M. reedi

Binomial name
- Monocentris reedi Schultz, 1956

Species of fish

Monocentris reedi is a species of ray-finned fish within the family Monocentridae. The species is found in the southeastern Pacific near Chile off the Juan Fernández Islands, Nazca Ridge and the Desventuradas Islands, where it lives a demersal lifestyle inhabiting tide pools, caves, and deep rocky reefs at depths of 10 to 250 metres (30 to 820 ft). It grows to lengths of 9.2 to 9.9 cm (3.6 to 3.9 in).

Monocentris reedi has been assessed as a 'least concern' species by the IUCN Red List as despite its small and limited range, it has no known major threats.
