= Parmops echinatus =

Scientific classification
- Domain: Eukaryota
- Kingdom: Animalia
- Phylum: Chordata
- Class: Actinopterygii
- Order: Trachichthyiformes
- Family: Anomalopidae
- Genus: Parmops
- Species: P. echinatus

Binomial name
- Parmops echinatus Rosenblatt, Seeto, & Johnson, 2001

Species of fish

Parmops echinatus is a species of flashlight fish found in the western Pacific Ocean. It was first described in 2001 from two specimens caught off the coast of Fiji at depths of 440 m (1,440 ft) and 550 m (1,800 ft).
