= Photoblepharon =

Scientific classification
- Kingdom: Animalia
- Phylum: Chordata
- Class: Actinopterygii
- Order: Trachichthyiformes
- Family: Anomalopidae
- Genus: Photoblepharon; M. C. W. Weber, 1902

Genus of fishes

Photoblepharon is a genus of poorly understood flashlight fishes found around reefs in the western Pacific Ocean (P. palpebratum) and in the western Indian Ocean (P. steinitzi). Both of its species are nocturnal predators, hiding in caves and crevices during the day and emerging at night to feed. They are small fish, 11.0–12.0 cm (4.3–4.7 in) maximum length, and of little commercial value, although fishermen have been known to use their light organs as bait. Like other anomalopids, they are notable for the white organs containing bioluminescent bacteria underneath their eyes, which, by emitting a blue-green light, allow the fish to search for food, evade predators, and communicate with other fish. Both species have black lids that slide up to cover the organ when the fish does not want to emit light. Although similar in appearance, they can be easily distinguished by the preopercle, which has a medium-sized white spot in P. palpebratum, whereas in P. steinitzi, it is much smaller and much darker, or not present at all. Neither species has been evaluated by the International Union for Conservation of Nature (IUCN) and their nocturnal natures make collection difficult and sightings uncommon.

== Species ==
There are currently 2 recognized species in this genus:

- Photoblepharon palpebratum (Boddaert, 1781) (eyelight fish)
- Photoblepharon steinitzi T. Abe & Haneda, 1973 (flashlight fish)
