= Parmops =

Scientific classification
- Kingdom: Animalia
- Phylum: Chordata
- Class: Actinopterygii
- Order: Trachichthyiformes
- Family: Anomalopidae
- Genus: Parmops; Rosenblatt & G. D. Johnson, 1991

Genus of fishes

Parmops is a genus of flashlight fishes found in the deep waters of the central Pacific Ocean. P. coruscans is found in the Eastern Pacific around Tahiti and P. echinatus is found in the Western Pacific around Fiji.

== Species ==
There are currently two recognized species in this genus:

- Parmops coruscans Rosenblatt & G. D. Johnson, 1991
- Parmops echinatus G. D. Johnson, Seeto & Rosenblatt, 2001
