= Protoblepharon =

Scientific classification
- Kingdom: Animalia
- Phylum: Chordata
- Class: Actinopterygii
- Order: Trachichthyiformes
- Family: Anomalopidae
- Genus: Protoblepharon; C. C. Baldwin, G. D. Johnson & Paxton, 1997

Genus of fishes

Protoblepharon is a genus of flashlight fishes known from the Pacific Ocean from around the Cook Islands (P. rosenblatti) and off of eastern Taiwan (P. mccoskeri).

== Species ==
There are currently two recognized species in this genus:

- Protoblepharon mccoskeri H. C. Ho & G. D. Johnson, 2012 (Taiwanese flashlightfish)
- Protoblepharon rosenblatti C. C. Baldwin, G. D. Johnson & Paxton, 1997 (Cook Islands flashlightfish)
