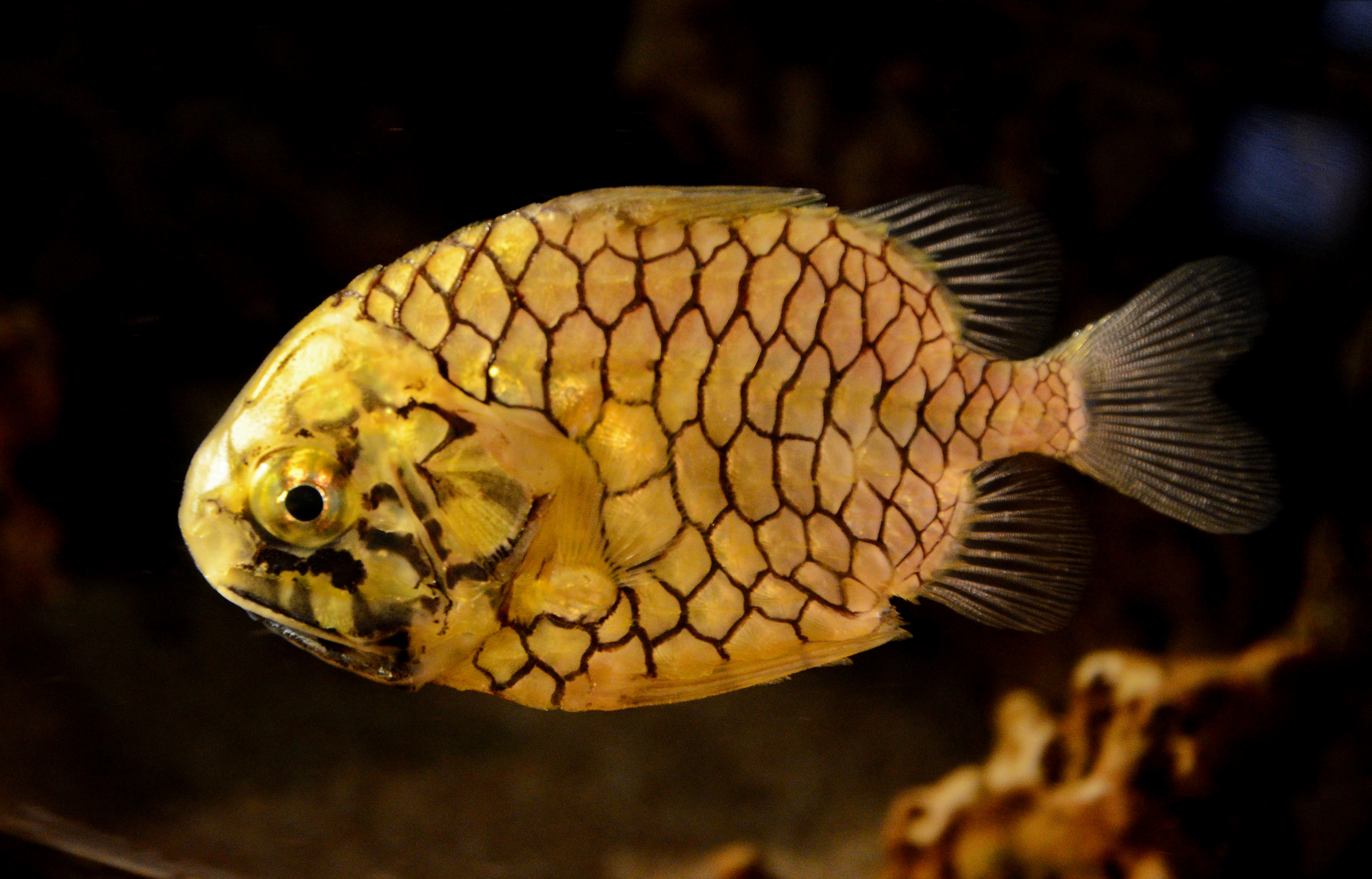

Conservation status
- Least Concern (IUCN 3.1)

Scientific classification
- Kingdom: Animalia
- Phylum: Chordata
- Class: Actinopterygii
- Order: Trachichthyiformes
- Family: Monocentridae
- Genus: Monocentris
- Species: M. japonica

Binomial name
- Monocentris japonica (Houttuyn, 1782)

Synonyms
- Gasterosteus japonicus Houttuyn, 1782; Monocentris carinata Bloch & Schneider, 1801; Sciaena cataphracta Thunberg, 1790

= Monocentris japonica =

Species of fish

Monocentris japonica, the Japanese pineapplefish, is a species of marine ray-finned fish in the pinecone fish family Monocentridae. It is found in the tropical Indo-West Pacific, at depths between 2–100 m (6.6–328.1 ft), where it inhabits rocky and coral reefs.

== Morphology ==
The Japanese pineapplefish is yellow with distinct large scutes outlined in black. It has light-producing organs filled with luminescent bacteria on each side of the lower jaw, the purpose of which is not known, but it is conjectured that these may help it to see at night or to attract prey. The fish may grow to 17 cm (6.7 in) in length, but a length of 12 cm (4.7 in) is more common.

As noted above, the Japanese pineapplefish is covered in scutes; these replace the usual scales, which are completely absent. Scutes are similar to scales in function, but differ in its formation: unlike the latter, which are formed from the epidermis, scutes are formed in the lower vascular layer of the skin.

== Biology ==
The Japanese pineapplefish is nocturnal and shelters in caves and under ledges during the day.

== Human interactions ==
The Japanese pineapplefish is often kept by aquarists, as it is not aggressive and is relatively easy to keep. In aquaria, it is usually fed fresh marine foods or brine shrimp.

== Gallery ==
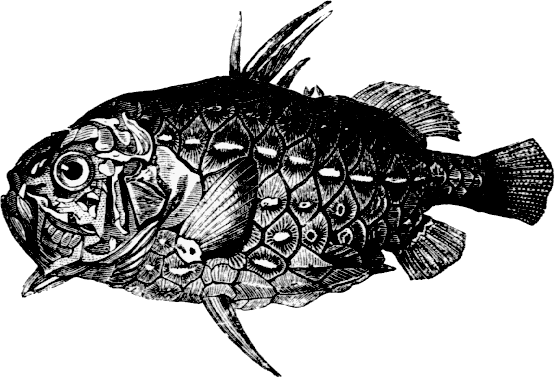
Illustration with the anatomy of the skull exposed

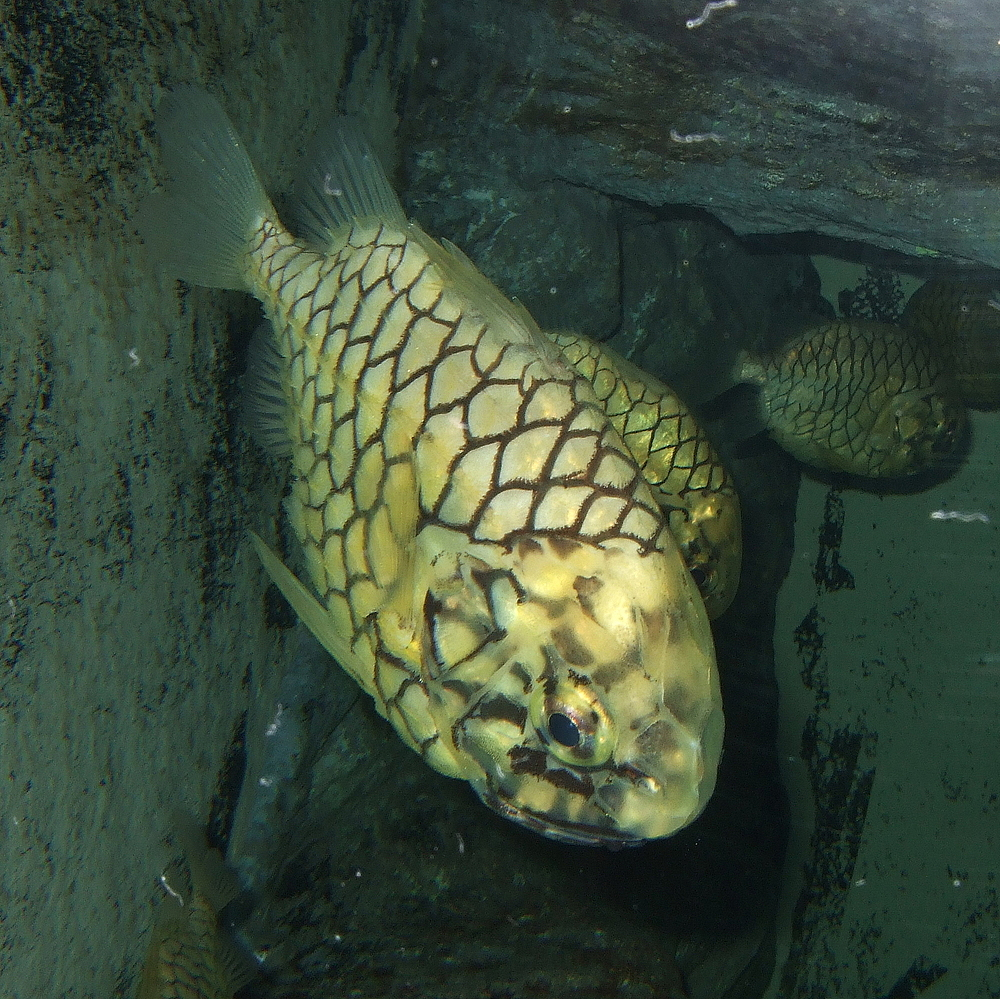
At the Himeji Aquarium, Japan

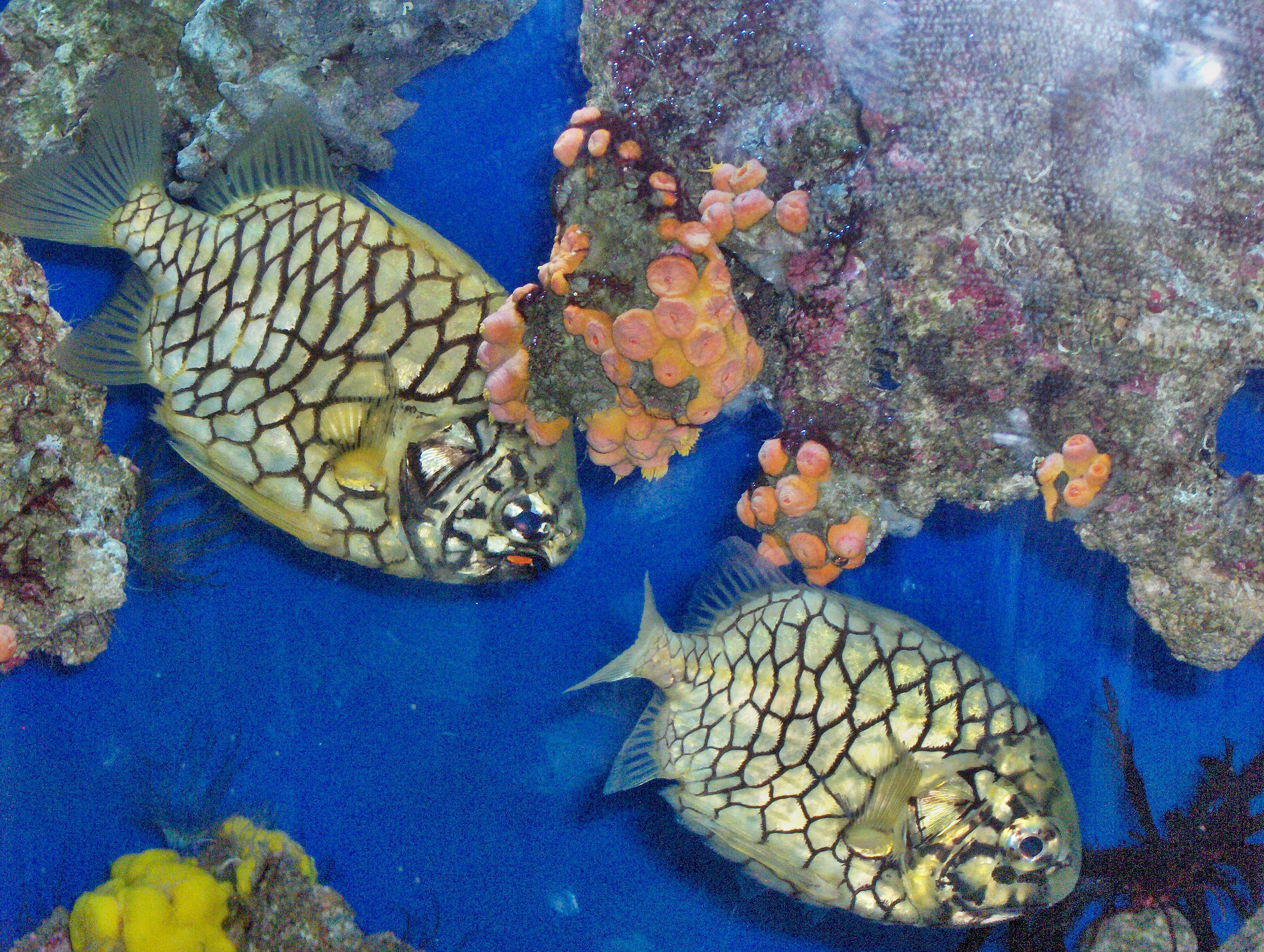
At the Oceanographic Museum of Monaco

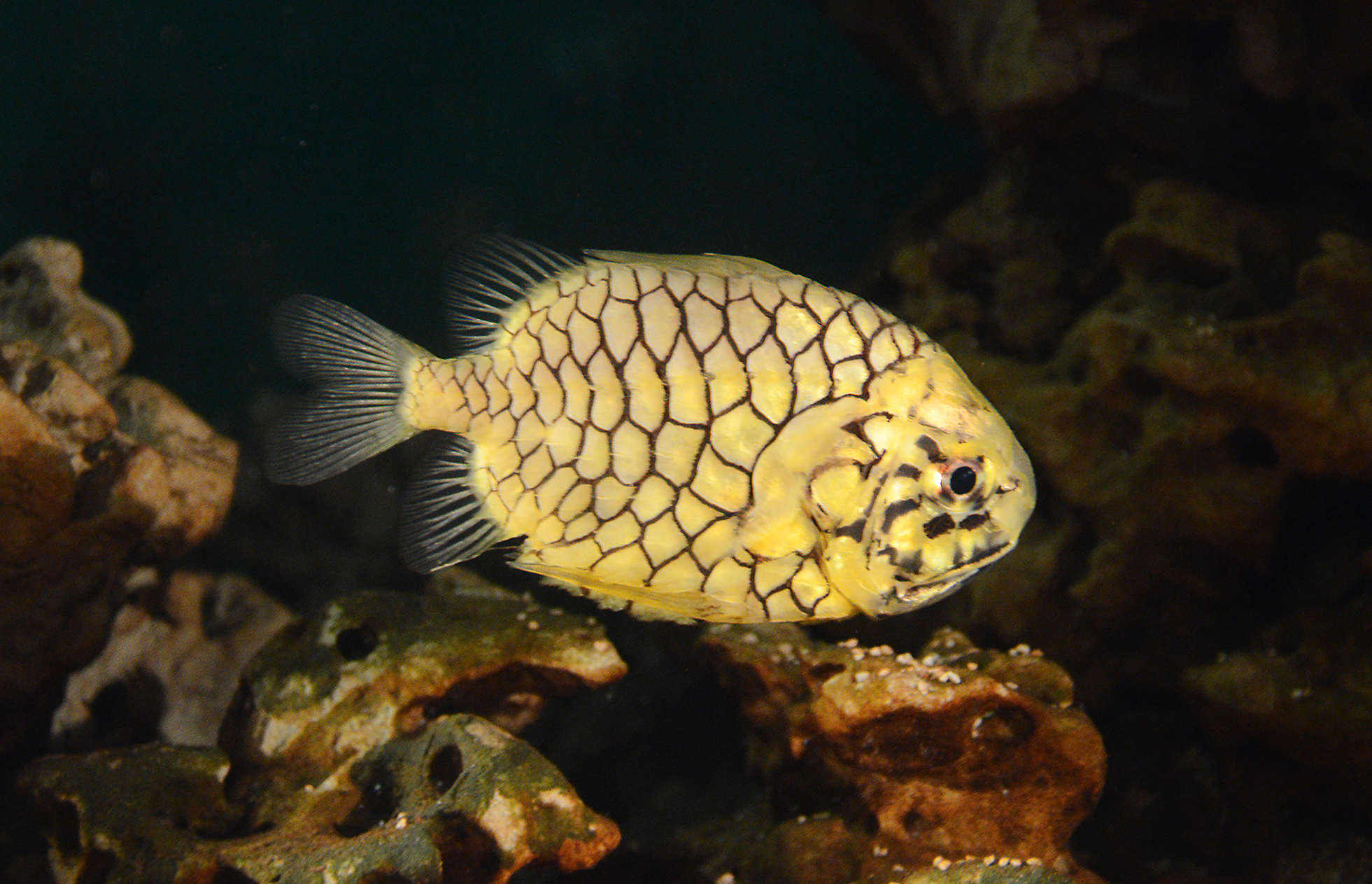

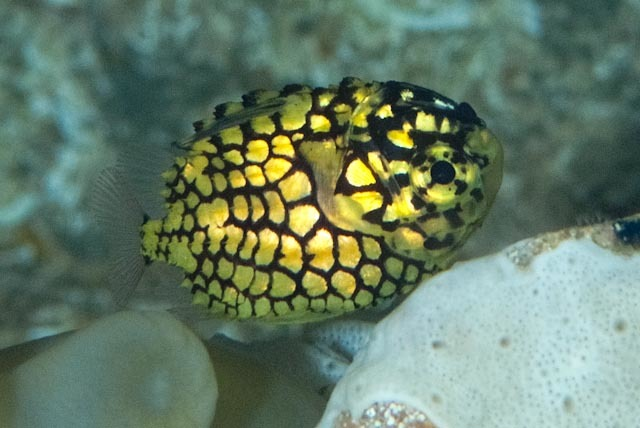
Upside down

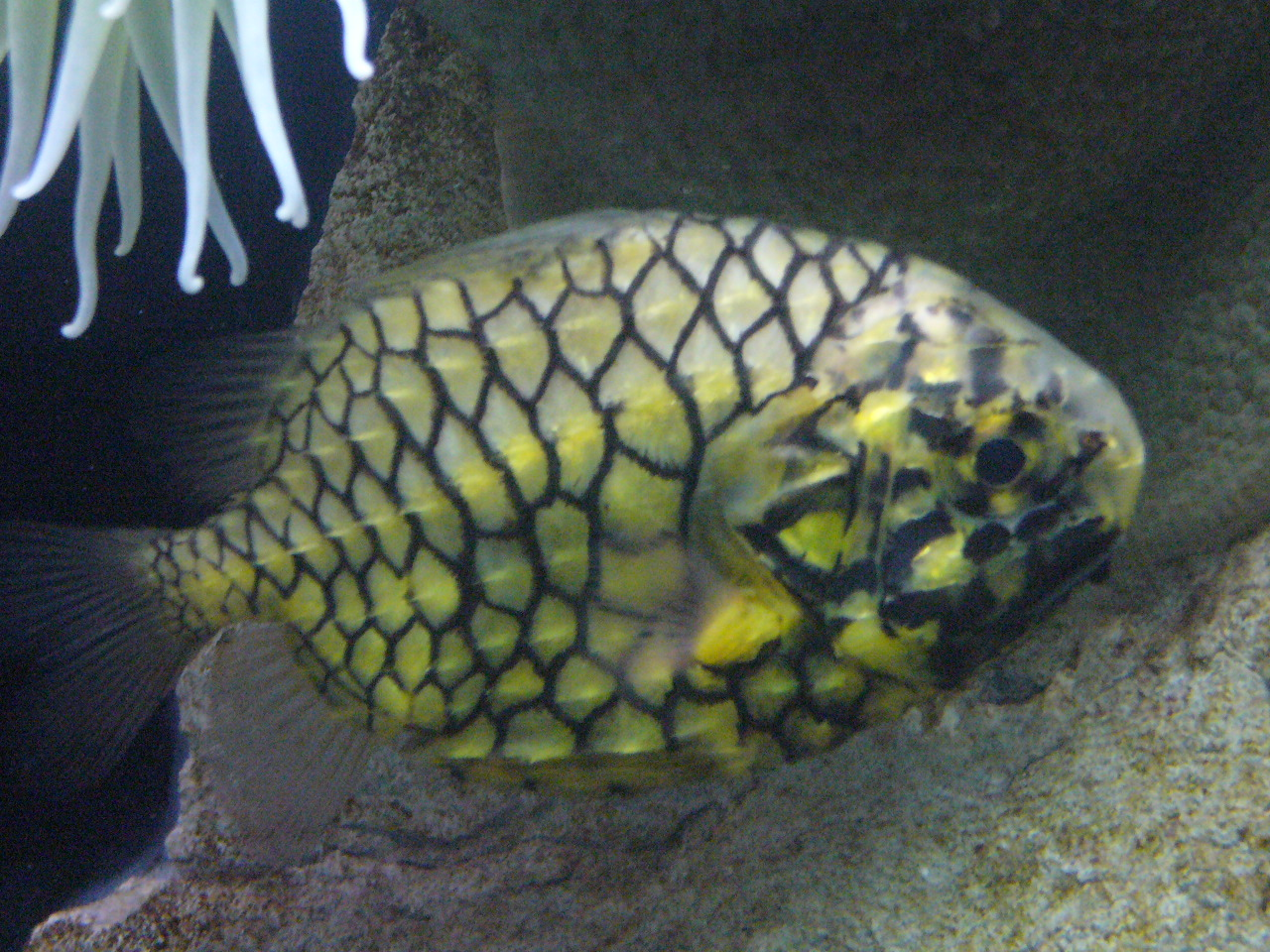
