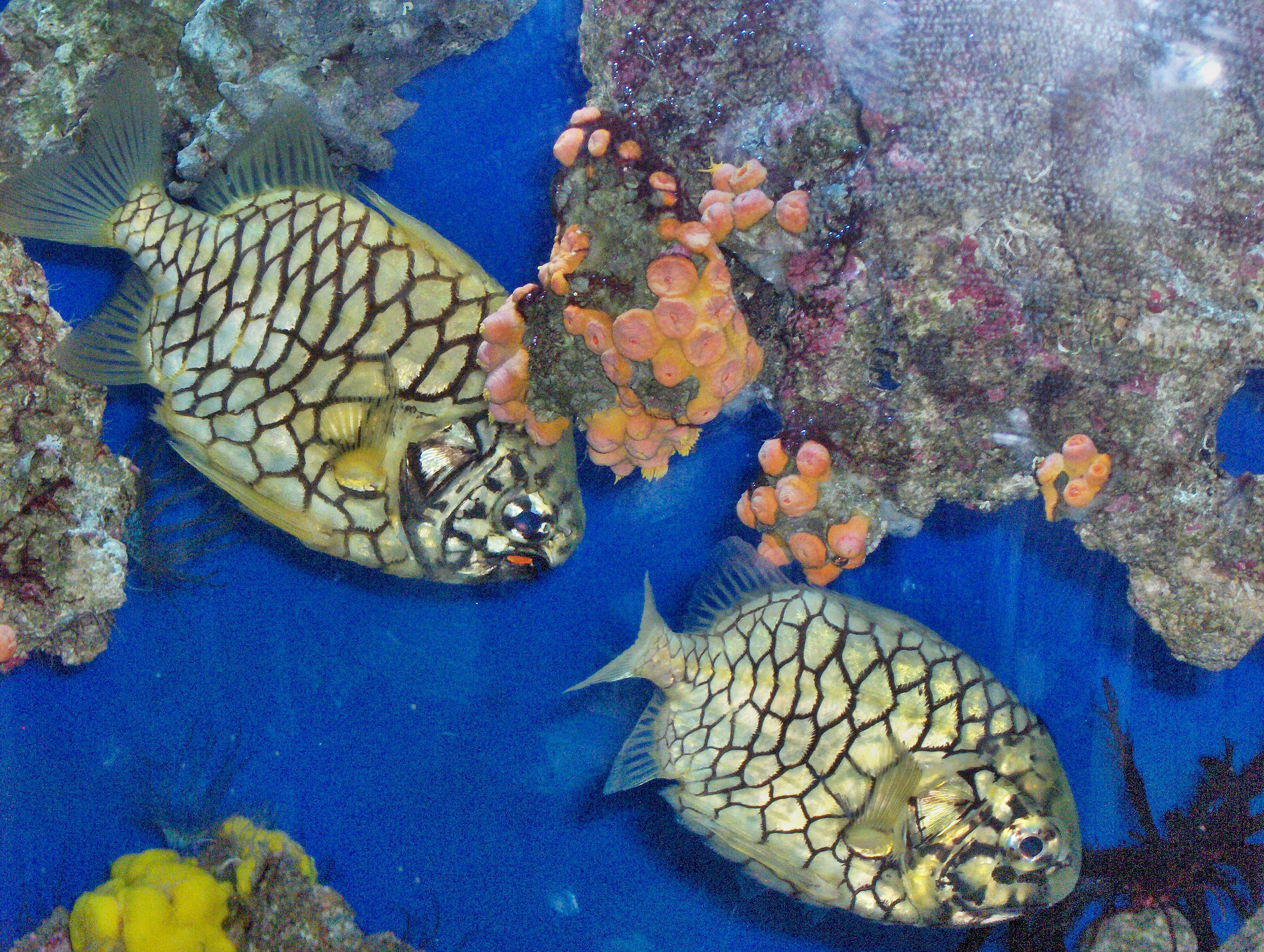
- Monocentris japonica

Scientific classification
- Kingdom: Animalia
- Phylum: Chordata
- Class: Actinopterygii
- Order: Trachichthyiformes
- Family: Monocentridae
- Genus: Monocentris; Bloch & J. G. Schneider, 1801

= Monocentris =

Genus of fishes

Monocentris is a genus of marine ray-finned fishes in the family Monocentridae, the pinecone fishes or pineapplefishes. Species of the genus occur in the Indo-Pacific and southeastern Pacific. They are characterized by a deep, compressed body covered with large, heavy, plate-like scales, and by paired light organs on the lower jaw.

== Taxonomy ==
The genus Monocentris was described by Marcus Elieser Bloch and Johann Gottlob Schneider in 1801. It belongs to the family Monocentridae, a small family of heavily armoured marine fishes. The genus is closely related to Cleidopus, the only other extant genus usually placed in the family.

For much of the 20th and early 21st centuries, three species were commonly recognized in Monocentris. In 2022, Yo Su, Hsiu-Chin Lin and Hsuan-Ching Ho described Monocentris chrysadamas from the western Pacific and redescribed Monocentris japonica.

== Description ==
Like other members of the family Monocentridae, species of Monocentris have a robust, rounded and laterally compressed body covered by large, heavy, plate-like scales. These scales give the fishes their common names, because the body resembles a pinecone or pineapple.

The first dorsal fin has strong spines, while the second dorsal fin and the anal fin are positioned far back on the body. The pelvic fin has a large spine that can be locked in an erect position. Species of Monocentris also have two phosphorescent organs on the lower jaw. The light is produced by symbiotic luminescent bacteria and appears orange in daylight and blue-green at night. It is thought to help attract shrimps and other zooplankton at night.

== Distribution and habitat ==
Species of Monocentris are marine and demersal. They occur mainly in tropical and subtropical waters of the Indo-Pacific, although M. reedi is found in the southeastern Pacific near Chile.

Pinecone fishes are generally associated with rocky reefs, caves and ledges. FishBase records M. japonica from ledges and caves of rocky reefs, with adults usually found between 20 and 200 m depth and juveniles sometimes occurring in shallower water. M. reedi has been recorded from the Desventuradas Islands, Nazca Ridge and Juan Fernández area, including caves, tide pools and rocky reef habitats.

== Species ==
There are currently four recognized species in this genus:

- Monocentris chrysadamas Su, Lin & Ho, 2022 – golden-diamond pineapplefish
- Monocentris japonica (Houttuyn, 1782) – Japanese pineapplefish
- Monocentris neozelanicus (Powell, 1938) – Maori pineconefish
- Monocentris reedi Schultz, 1956 – Reed's pineconefish
