= Scute =

Type of scale

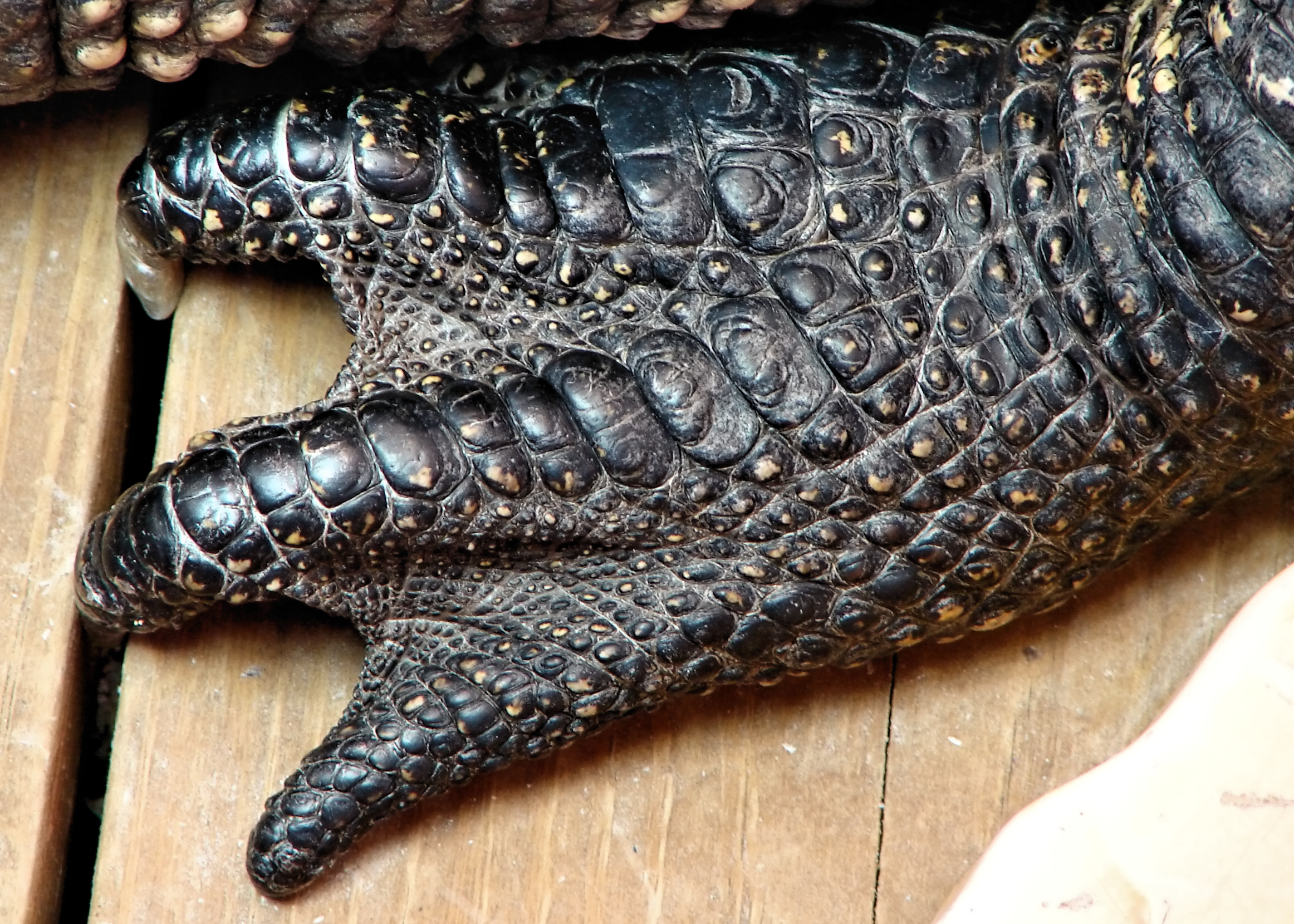
Scutes on an alligator foot

A scute (/skjuːt/) or scutum (Latin: scutum; plural: scuta "shield") is a bony external plate or scale overlaid with horn, as on the shell of a turtle, the skin of crocodilians, and the feet of birds. The term is also used to describe the anterior portion of the mesothorax in insects as well as some arachnids (e.g., the family Ixodidae, the scale ticks).

== Properties ==
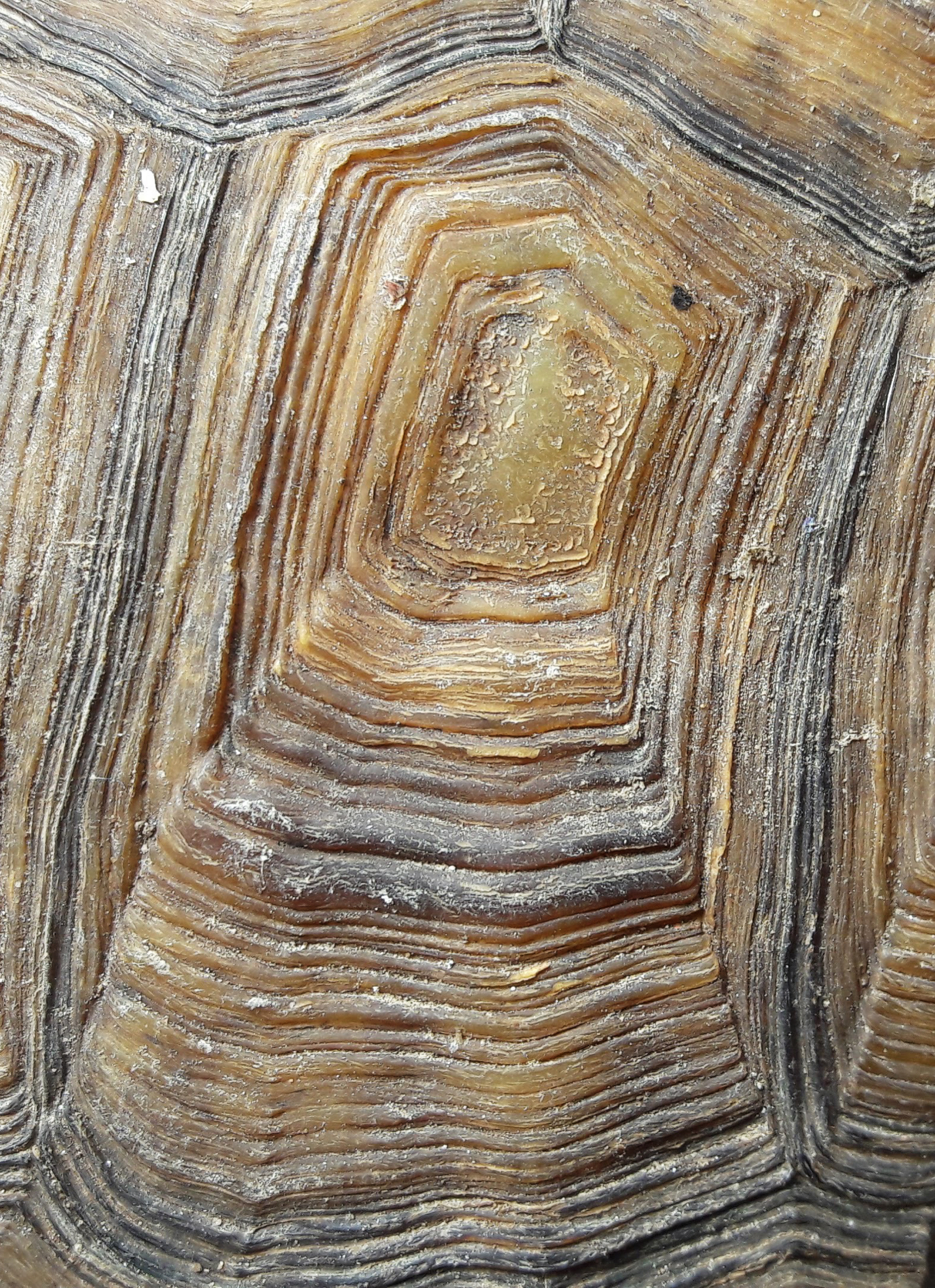
Scute of the carapace of a Texas tortoise

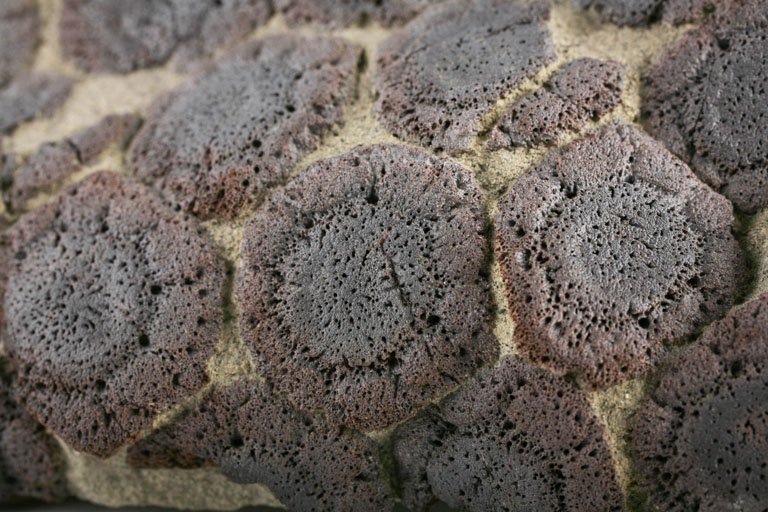
This detail of a Glyptodon displays its scutes. From the collection of the Children's Museum of Indianapolis.

Scutes are similar to scales and serve the same function. Unlike the scales of lizards and snakes, which are formed from the epidermis, scutes are formed in the lower vascular layer of the skin and the epidermal element is only the top surface. Forming in the living dermis, the scutes produce a horny outer layer that is superficially similar to that of scales. Scutes will usually not overlap as snake scales (but see the pangolin). The outer keratin layer is shed piecemeal, and not in one continuous layer of skin as seen in snakes or lizards. The dermal base may contain bone and produce dermal armour. Scutes with a bony base are properly called osteoderms. Dermal scutes are also found in the feet of birds and tails of some mammals, and are believed to be the primitive form of dermal armour in reptiles.

The term is also used to describe the heavy armour of the armadillo and the extinct Glyptodon, and is occasionally used as an alternative to scales in describing snakes or certain fishes, such as sturgeons, shad, herring, and menhaden.

== Mammals ==
Prehistoric ancestors of mammals, the synapsids, are thought to have scutes which were later reduced and replaced by hair. Excluding the attachment surface of fingernails, armoured scutes or scales are almost never seen in modern mammals. The horny scales of pangolins are only rarely called scutes, but "scute" is used to describe the heavy armour of the armadillo.

== Turtles ==
The turtle's shell is covered by scutes formed mostly of keratin. They are built similarly to horn, beak, or nail in other species.

== Fish ==
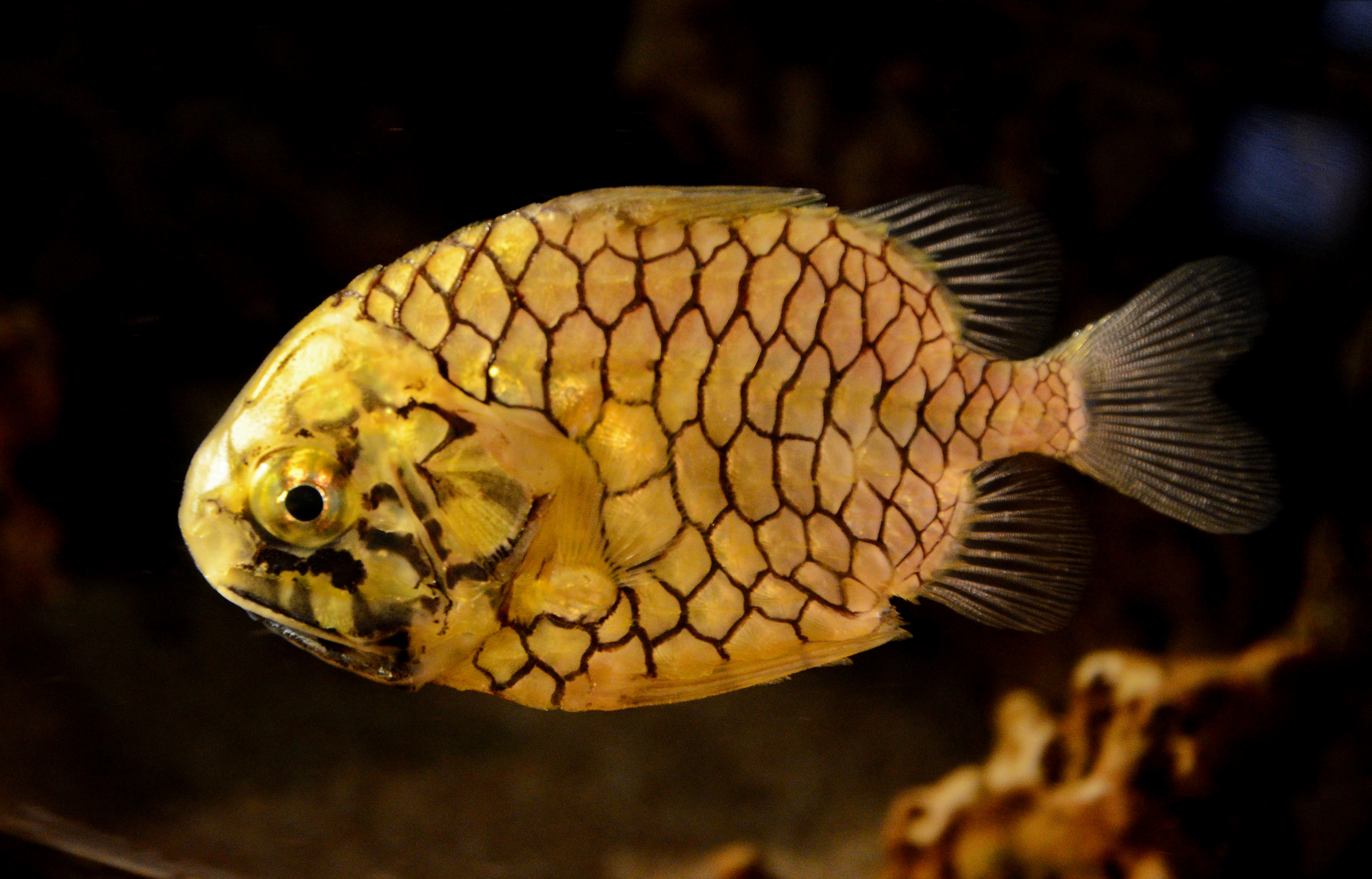
The pineconefish

Some fish, such as pineconefish, are completely or partially covered in large armored scales commonly termed scutes. Many Clupeomorpha have an abdominal row of scutes, which are scales with raised, sharp points that are used for protection, and in some cases they also possess dorsal scutes anterior to the dorsal fin, as in Knightia spp., Diplomystus spp. and certain extant taxa. Jacks of family Carangidae often have a row of scutes following the lateral line on either side. Coelorinchus spp. have scutes suborbitally from their preoperculum extending anteriorly onto a triangular snout. Sturgeon have five rows of scutes—modified ganoid scales—and are otherwise scaleless.

== Birds ==
The tarsometatarsus and toes of most birds are covered in two types of scales. Large scutes run along the dorsal side of the tarsometatarsus and toes, whereas smaller scutellae run along the sides. Both structures share histochemical homology with reptilian scales; however, work on their evolutionary development has revealed that the scales in bird feet have secondarily evolved via suppression of the feather-building genetic program. Unblocking the feather suppression program results in feathers growing in place of scales along the tarsometatarsus and toes. Dinosaur species very close to the origin of birds have been shown to have had "hind wings" made of feathers growing from these areas, suggesting that the acquisition of feathers in dinosaurs was a whole-body event. The bottoms of bird feet are covered in small, keeled scale-like structures known as reticulae. Evolutionary developmental studies on these scale-like structures have revealed that they are composed entirely of alpha keratin (true epidermal scales are composed of a mix of alpha and beta keratin). These data have led some researchers to suggest that reticulae are in fact highly truncated feathers.

== Insects and other arthropods ==
The term "scutum" is also used in insect and arachnid anatomy, as an alternative name for the anterior portion of the mesonotum (and, technically, the metanotum, though rarely applied in that context).

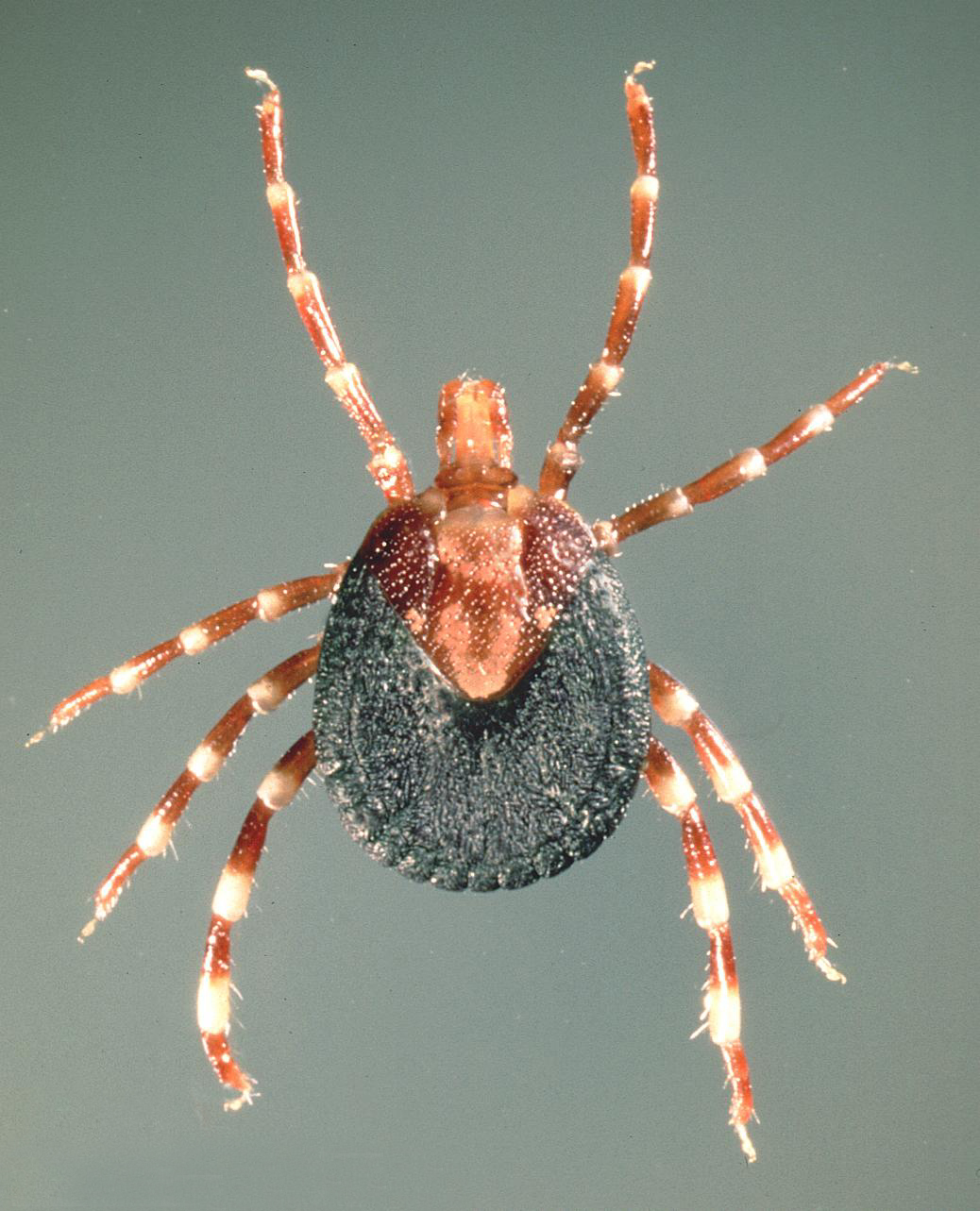
Conspicuous scutum on a typical female hard tick before she has fed. Note the pale eye-spots near the edges of the scutum, roughly between the 2nd and 3rd legs.

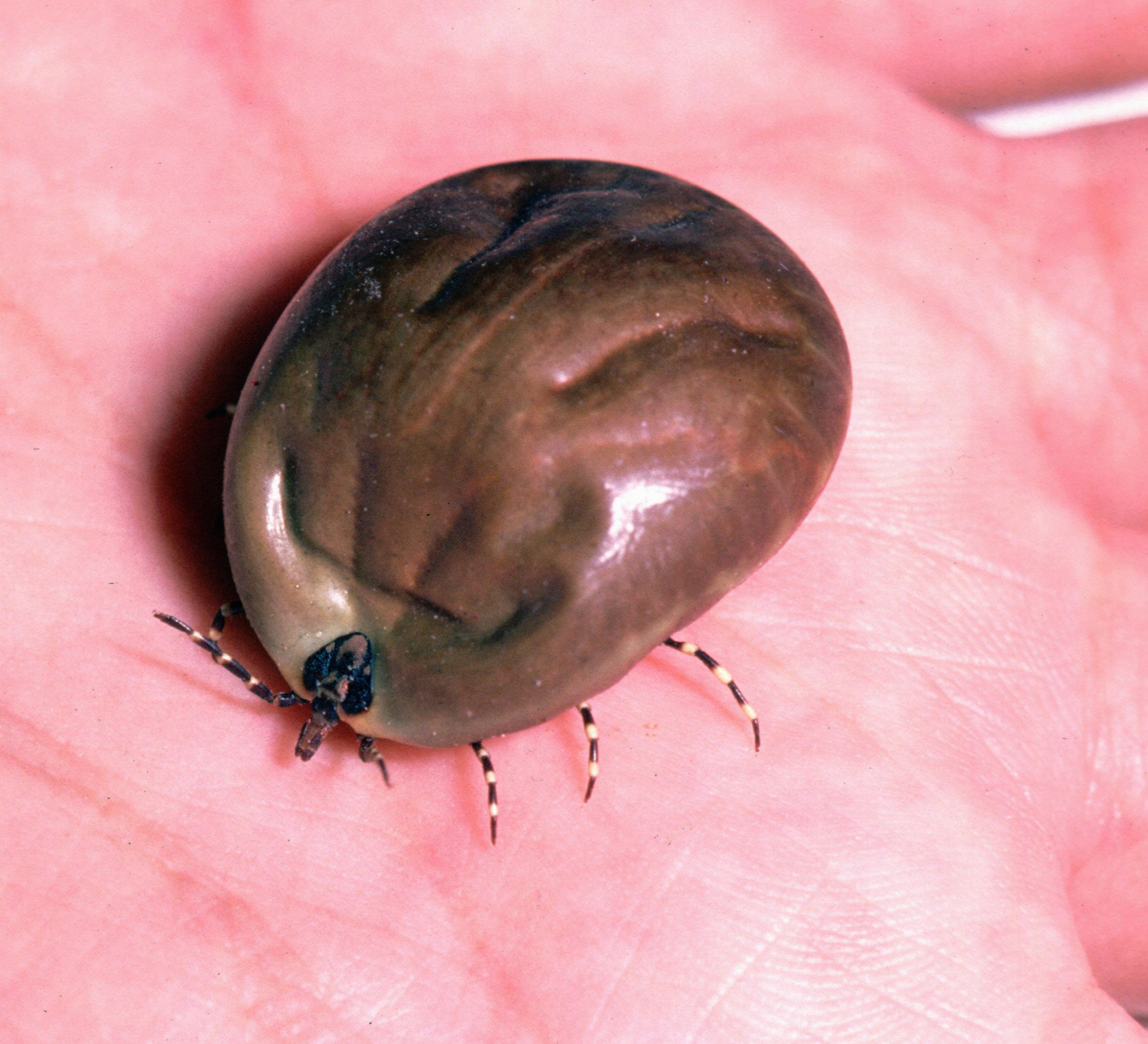
The same scutum is relatively less conspicuous after the tick has fed, because it has not changed in size, whereas the tick has swollen as it engorged.

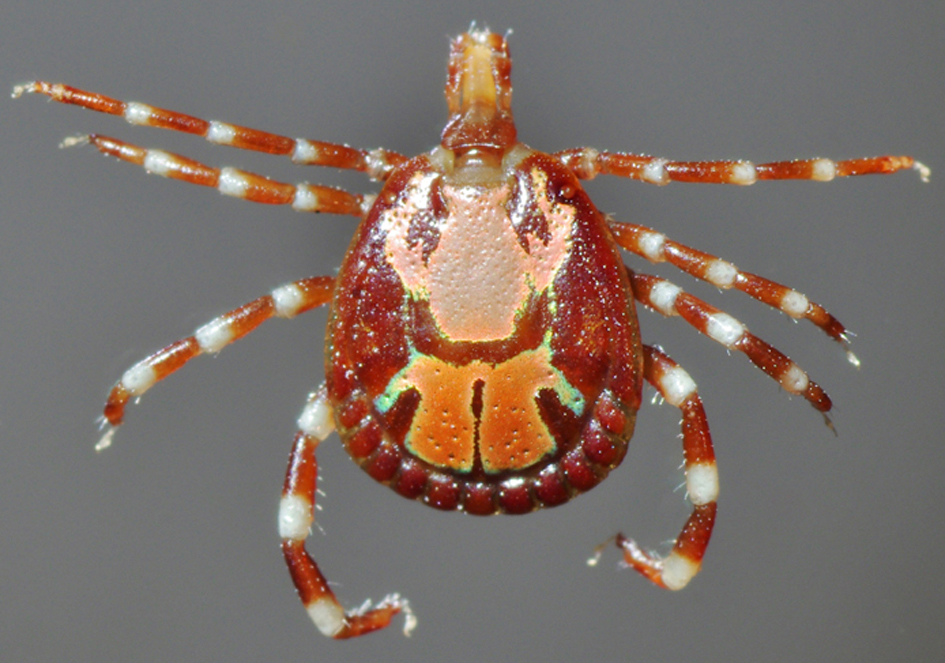
In the typical male hard tick, the conscutum covers practically the whole back.

In the hard ticks, the Ixodidae, the scutum is a rigid, sclerotised plate on the anterior dorsal surface, just posterior to the head. In species with eyes, the eyes are on the margin of the scutum. The flexible exoskeleton posterior to the rigid scutum of the female tick is called the alloscutum, the region that stretches to accommodate the blood with which the mature female tick becomes engorged. Males do not engorge nearly as drastically as females, so they do not need a flexible alloscutum; instead the rigid scutum covers practically the entire dorsal surface posterior to the head, and may be referred to specifically as the conscutum.

In some species of Opiliones, fused abdominal segments are referred to as a scutum.

== See also ==
- Fish scutes
- Osteoderms
- Scale (zoology)
- Snake scales
- Keratin
- Skin
- Skeleton
