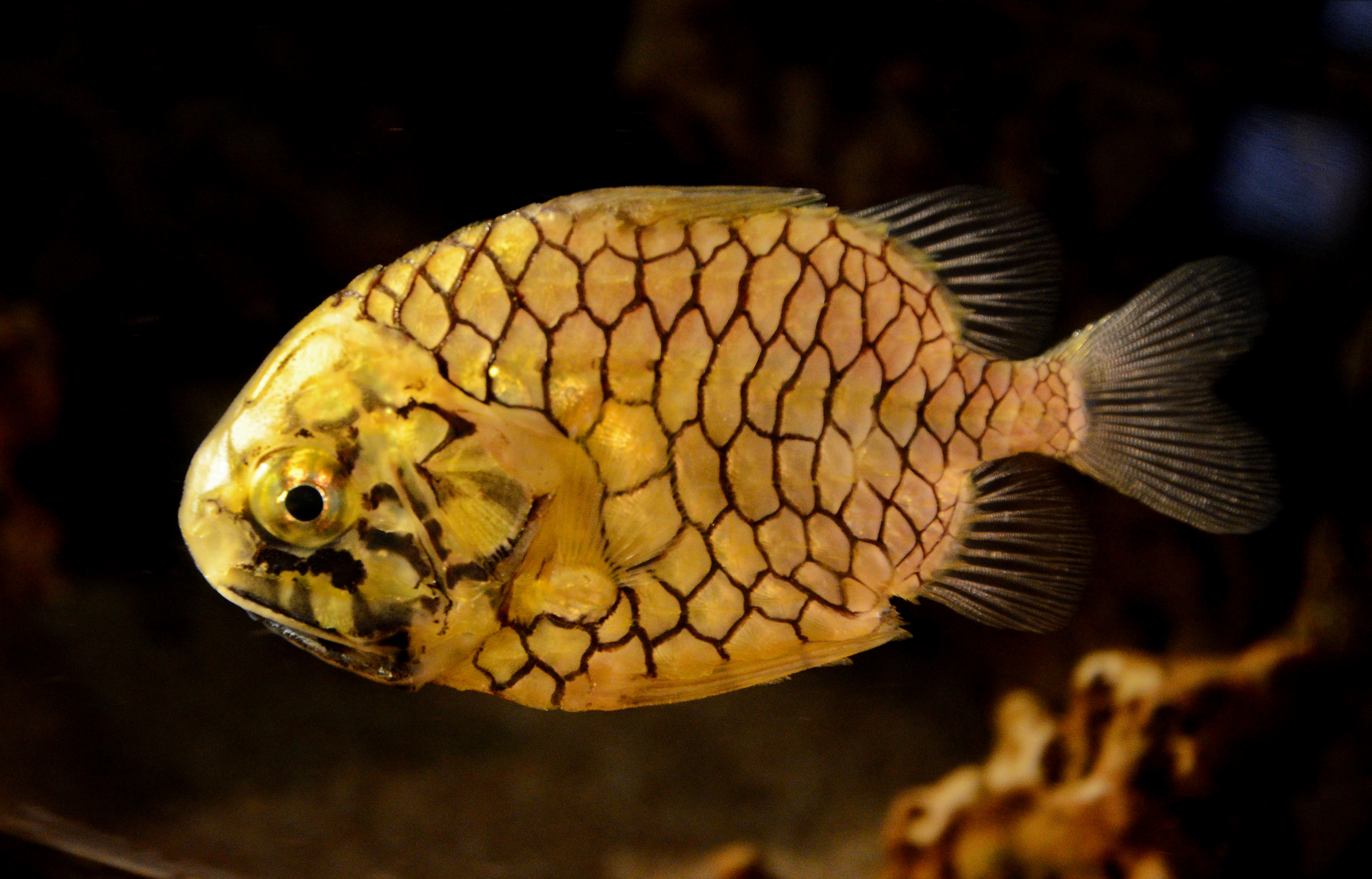
- Pinecone fish (Monocentris japonica)
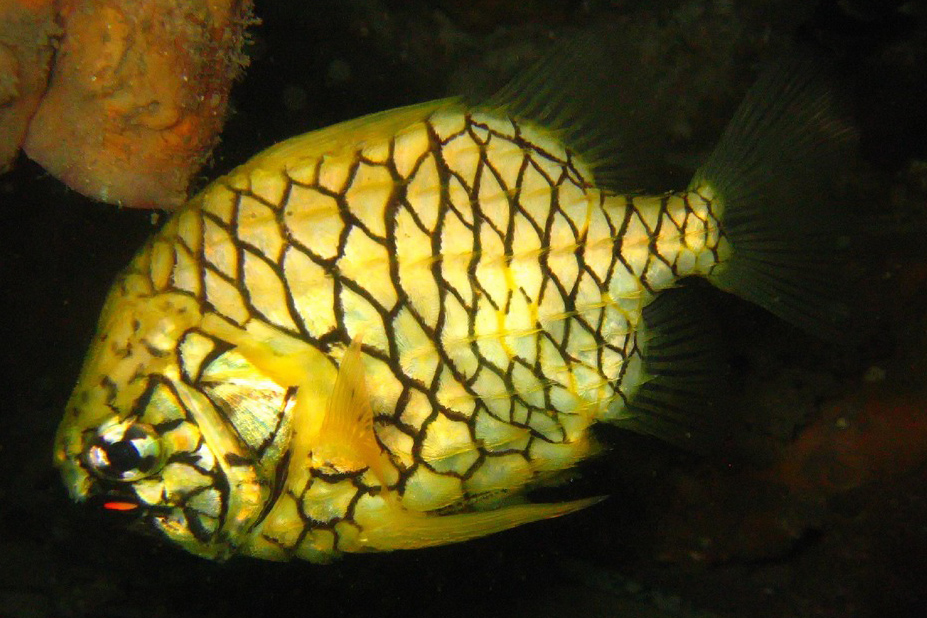
- Pineapplefish (Cleidopus gloriamaris)

Scientific classification
- Kingdom: Animalia
- Phylum: Chordata
- Class: Actinopterygii
- Division: Teleostei
- Order: Trachichthyiformes
- Suborder: Trachichthyoidei
- Family: Monocentridae; T. N. Gill, 1859

Genera
- Cleidopus; Monocentris

= Monocentridae =

Pinecone fishes

Family of fishes

Pinecone fishes are small and unusual marine fish of the family Monocentridae. The family contains just five species in two genera, one of which is monotypic. Their distribution is limited to tropical and subtropical waters of the Indo-Pacific. Pinecone fishes are popular subjects of public aquaria, but are both expensive and considered a challenge for the hobbyist to maintain.

== Description ==
These fish are aptly named; their rounded, compressed bodies are completely covered (with the exception of the caudal peduncle) with very large, strong, platelike scales called scutes, which are fortified with prominent ridges. The first dorsal fin is composed of four to seven strong, disunited spines which vary in length; the second dorsal fin and anal fin are small, spineless and rounded, situated far back of the convex head. The pectoral fins are somewhat elongate and the caudal fin is truncate.

Coloration is typically a yellow to orange, with the scales dramatically outlined in black. The eyes are relatively large, and the mouth is oblique and subterminal. On either side of the lower jaw is a bioluminescent organ called a photophore: a pale light is produced by symbiotic bacteria within the organ, and the color of the light varies with ambient light levels—orange by day and blue-green at night.

The pineapplefish, Cleidopus gloriamaris, is the largest species, reaching up to 30 cm (12 in) in length. Sexual dimorphism is not apparent.

== Life history ==
Pinecone fishes inhabit the sublittoral zone, and are associated with ledges and caves, rocky and (occasionally) coral reefs over a hard bottom. Found at 10–200 m deep (with juveniles frequenting the shallower end of this range), pinecone fishes are nocturnal and form schools.

The photophores are thought to play a role in attracting the zooplankton upon which the fish feed; intraspecific communication may also be a use for the light. Little is known of their reproductive biology, but they are assumed not to guard their brood.
