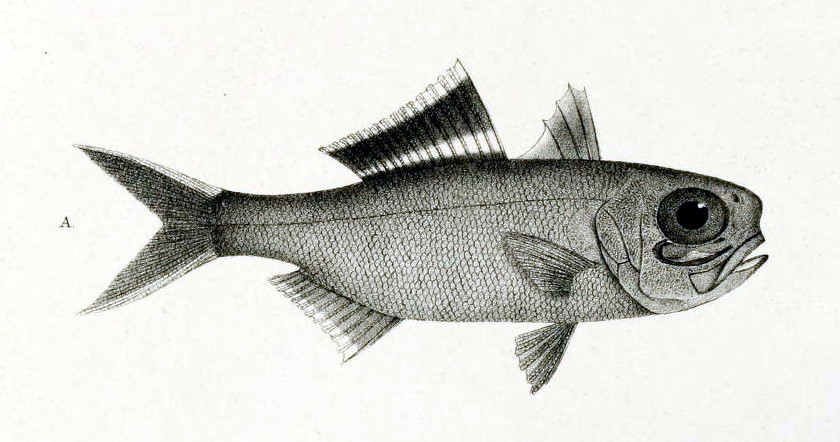

Conservation status
- Least Concern (IUCN 3.1)

Scientific classification
- Kingdom: Animalia
- Phylum: Chordata
- Class: Actinopterygii
- Division: Teleostei
- Order: Trachichthyiformes
- Family: Anomalopidae
- Genus: Anomalops; Kner, 1868
- Species: A. katoptron

Binomial name
- Anomalops katoptron (Bleeker, 1856)

= Splitfin flashlightfish =

Species of fish

The splitfin flashlightfish or two-fin flashlightfish (Anomalops katoptron) is a species of schooling reef fish in the family Anomalopidae. It is found in warm waters in the central and western Pacific Ocean near reefs 200–400 m (660–1,300 ft) in depth. It can grow to a length of 35 cm (14 in) TL. It is the only known member of the genus Anomalops. It is listed under the IUCN as a species of least concern.

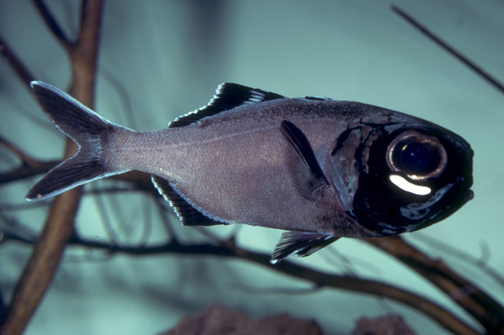
A. Katoptron located in the Steinhart Aquarium at the California Academy of Sciences (credit to Kenneth Lucas).

== Description ==
The splitfin flashlightfish is characterized by a black body with a blue tinge along the dorsal and caudal fins. Adults can reach up to 35 cm (14 in) TL in length but on average measure anywhere between 10 cm to 30 cm (4–12 in). It has a slightly laterally compressed deep body with an upwards terminal mouth and narrow caudal peduncle. It has two separate dorsal fins: the anterior portion consisting of 6-7 dorsal spines and the posterior portion consisting of 14-15 soft dorsal rays. Its anal fin contains 2 spines and 9-11 soft rays.

Its most prominent features are the two bean shaped torch-like organs under its eyes containing symbiotic bioluminescent bacteria Candidatus photodesmus katoptron, which the fish can turn on and off by blinking. The light organs are embedded in suborbital cavities and are connected at the anterior edge via a cartilaginous rod-like attachment. The suborbital light organs are densely settled with luminous symbiotic bacteria that grow in tubular structures and produce a constant bluish light of around 500 nm in wavelength. One face of these organs is black, whereas the other is luminous. To turn ‘on’ its light, A. katoptron rotates the organ length-wise so that the luminous face is exposed to the outside. To turn ‘off’ its light, it then rotates the luminous face down towards the body, presenting the black pigmented face outwards. This is a vastly different and unique rotating mechanism for manipulating its eye organs, as most other related flashlight fish have a ‘shutter’ mechanism.

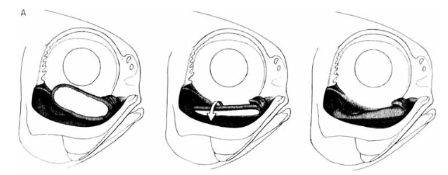
Method of occlusion of light organ in Anomalops katoptron.

The bioluminescent bacteria Candidatus photodesmus katoptron has only been recently discovered in 2011 as symbiotic with A. katoptron, meaning that it can only survive in its host. There are no known lab-cultivated populations of the bacteria. The size of the bacterial genome is relatively small compared to others in the Vibrionaceae genus. The inability to grow under laboratory conditions can be attributed to this genome reduction and gene loss. Via thorough phylogenetic analysis, the splitfin flashlightfish and its symbiont are a key example highlighting rapid co-evolution and population bottlenecks that suggest an obligately dependent relationship. However, a mechanism by which anomalopid bacteria transfer between host generations is still unknown.

== Distribution and habitat ==
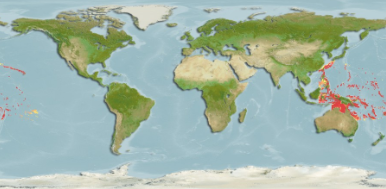
This computer generated native distribution map for A. katoptron demonstrates its areas of hypothetical occurrence.

Splitfin flashlightfish are found in the western and central Pacific Ocean from the Philippines and Indonesia east to the Tuamotus, north to Japan, and south to the Great Barrier Reef. It is generally found near drop-offs and caves 200–400 m (660–1,310 ft) in depth, but will move into shallower waters during the winter months.

== Biology and ecology ==
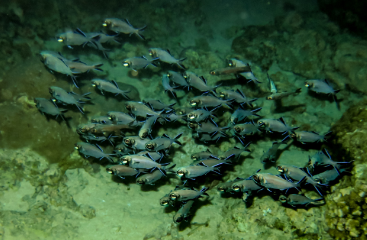
A school of A. katoptron in the Bando Islands, Indonesia.

A nocturnal species, the splitfin flashlightfish avoids sunlight and seeks prey in dark areas. It feeds primarily on zooplankton. Individuals can be found in large schools during moonless nights in the shallow water of coral reefs and in the open surrounding water.

Its bioluminescent organs serve a functional purpose in searching for and detecting planktonic prey. Researchers have found that in darkness (periods of activity), A. katoptron has high blink frequencies and increases the amount of time light organs are on. Paired with their schooling behavior, this high blinking frequency can confuse and deter predators. During the day (periods of inactivity), A. katoptron reduces blink frequency and decreases the amount of time light organs are on. When in the presence of prey, A. katoptron emits a constant glow from their light organs, effectively illuminating their meal. This, however, presents a trade off by making themselves more vulnerable to predators.

Changes in eyeshine and occlusion of the eye organ also elucidates the possibility of a communication system among fish. Further research has revealed that the blinking mechanism of the splitfin flashlightfish also assists in keeping a cohesive school of fish together. Intraspecific communication between A. katoptron is crucial for the movement of a school of fish. In addition to lateral line sensing, blinking of the light organs also aids A. katoptron in determining the distance between itself and its nearest neighbor in a school. A well communicating school best avoids predators and preys on food.

Despite its important functionality, bioluminescence can be lost in A. katoptron if faced with starvation. Observations suggest that this is because of reduced nutrients in the bloodstream, which ultimately supplies the light organs in parallel running capillaries. This highlights the symbiotic dependence between A. katoptron and its light-emitting bacteria.

There is very little known about the reproduction of the splitfin flashlightfish. It is believed that they are broadcast spawners. This type of spawning involves eggs and sperm being released into the water column where external fertilization occurs.

== In the aquarium ==
This fish can be found in the aquarium trade. It can be kept with other nocturnal fish, including pinecone fish, glasseye squirrelfish, and cardinalfish. This species requires plenty of hiding places and low lighting in the aquarium. Bioluminescence may be lost in captive A. katoptron, but experimental husbandry efforts by the Toledo Zoo have demonstrated that providing adequate food, maintaining stable temperatures, and adding occasional bacterial cultures of Vibrio fischeri (a marine photobacterium) may help the fish regain and/or retain the desired luminosity for viewers. Spawning of the related flashlightfish Photoblepharon palpebratum in an aquarium was observed by Meyer-Rochow in 1976.

There is very little known about the reproduction of the splitfin flashlightfish. It is believed that they are broadcast spawners. This type of spawning involves eggs and sperm being released into the water column where external fertilization occurs.
