= Phthanophaneron =

Conservation status
- Data Deficient (IUCN 3.1)

Scientific classification
- Kingdom: Animalia
- Phylum: Chordata
- Class: Actinopterygii
- Order: Trachichthyiformes
- Family: Anomalopidae
- Genus: Phthanophaneron; G. D. Johnson & Rosenblatt, 1988
- Species: P. harveyi

Binomial name
- Phthanophaneron harveyi (Rosenblatt & Montgomery, 1976)

Synonyms
- Kryptophanaron harveyi Rosenblatt & Montgomery, 1976

Species of fish

Phthanophaneron harveyi, the Gulf flashlightfish, is a species of saltwater fish of the family Anomalopidae. It is endemic to the Gulf of California. This cryptic fish is the only known member of the genus Phthanophaneron. It was first reported in the Pacific Ocean in 1976 and is extremely rare.

== Taxonomy ==
Its genus name comes from Greek: "phthano" meaning "to arrive the first", and "phaneros" meaning "visible." It was named "harveyi" after American zoologist and leading bioluminescence authority Edmund Newton Harvey. It was originally classified as a species of Kryptophanaron along with the Atlantic flashlightfish, but was later moved to its own genus.

== Description ==
Although some sources list its maximum size as 8.0 cm (3.1 in) TL, a 1986 paper claims that a female specimen was caught with a length of 20.4 cm (8.0 in) SL.

Oblong body; Large head, bones of the head and shoulder girdle are sculptured with numerous spine-bearing ridges; Broad ridges and skin separate the sensory canals at the top of the head; short and blunt snout; oblique mouth, moderately sized; teeth small and conical; large eye that is wider than the snout; only one papilla is found behind the eye; dorsal fin is in two parts; caudal fin deeply forked; small and rough scales; approximately 80 in longitudinal series on upper side; row of 12-13 enlarged and keeled scales.

Blackish-brown with no reflective markings on body; prominent pearly white luminous organ under eye

== Distribution and habitat ==
Phthanophaneron harveyi is found only in the eastern Pacific Ocean off the coast of Baja California. It is only known from four specimens. The depths at which it was caught were between 32 and 36 m (105 and 118 ft). It is associated with reefs and can be found over soft and rocky substrates.

== Relationship with humans ==
Little is known about P. harveyi. It has been caught by shrimp trawlers, but only "very rarely."

== Reproduction ==
Phthanophaneron harveyi reproduces through unguarded pelagic eggs.

== Conservation facts ==
Due to being data deficient, little is known about Phthanophaneron harveyi although it is unique and cannot be confused with other species. It is extremely rare and has only been caught 15 times since the first capture in 1976.
