= Kryptophanaron =

Conservation status
- Least Concern (IUCN 3.1)

Scientific classification
- Kingdom: Animalia
- Phylum: Chordata
- Class: Actinopterygii
- Order: Trachichthyiformes
- Family: Anomalopidae
- Genus: Kryptophanaron; Silvester & Fowler, 1926
- Species: K. alfredi

Binomial name
- Kryptophanaron alfredi Silvester & Fowler, 1926

Genus of fishes

Kryptophanaron alfredi, the Atlantic flashlightfish, is a species of flashlight fish native to the western Atlantic Ocean. During the day, it is found in waters as deep as 200 metres (660 ft). On moonless nights, it ascends to shallow waters around 25 metres (82 ft) in depth where it feeds on small shrimp and copepods as it swims over the ocean floor. This species grows to a length of 12.5 centimetres (4.9 in) TL. This species is the only known member of the genus Kryptophanaron and can be found in the aquarium trade.

Kryptophanaron alfredi has a special organ near its mouth that is specially adapted for the growth of luminescent bacteria (Photobacterium). Enough light is generated from millions of bacteria that the fish can navigate over coral reefs at night and attract prey to their light. The light organ has a membrane that descends like an eyelid to control the amount of light emitted.

== Distribution ==
Kryptophanaron alfredi has a wide range in the western Atlantic Ocean and Caribbean Sea and can be found around numerous islands, including the Bahamas, the Cayman Islands, Jamaica, Navassa Island, Puerto Rico, the Virgin Islands, Honduran Bay Islands, and Curacao.

== Conservation ==
Although not much is known about the population of K. alfredi due to its deep-water habitat and nocturnal behavior, it is listed as "Least Concern" by the IUCN because of its large range and lack of major threats.
