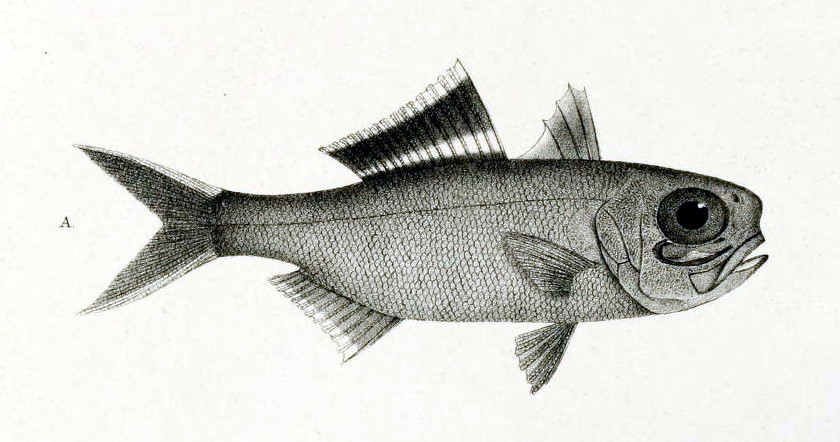

Scientific classification
- Kingdom: Animalia
- Phylum: Chordata
- Class: Actinopterygii
- Order: Trachichthyiformes
- Suborder: Trachichthyoidei
- Family: Anomalopidae; T. N. Gill, 1889

Genera
- Anomalops; Kryptophanaron; Parmops; Photoblepharon; Phthanophaneron; Protoblepharon

= Anomalopidae =

Family of bioluminescent fish

Anomalopidae (lanterneye fishes or flashlight fishes) are a family of fish distinguished by bioluminescent organs located underneath their eyes, for which they are named. These light organs contain luminous bacteria and can be "shut off" by the fish using either a dark lid or by being drawn into a pouch. They are used to communicate, attract prey, and evade predators.

Flashlight fish are found in tropical ocean waters across the world. They are typically about 14 cm (5.5 in) in size, although some species can reach twice this length. They are nocturnal, feeding at night on small crustaceans. Some species move to shallow waters near coral reefs at night, but otherwise, they are exclusively deep water fish. This tends to make their collection difficult, and as such they are a poorly understood group.

Anomalopidae were originally divided into 5 distinct species: Anomalops katoptron and Photoblepharon palpebratus, widely distributed in the central and western Pacific Ocean; P. steinitzi from the Red Sea and Comoro Islands; Kryptophanaron alfredi from the Caribbean; and K. harveyi from Baja California. In 2019 the genus Photoblepharon was reduced to only 2 species: P. palpebratum from the eastern Indian Ocean and the western Pacific Ocean and P. steinitzi from the Red Sea, Oman, and western Indian Ocean. Other genera include Parmops and Phthanophaneron.
