= Coral reefs of Jamaica =

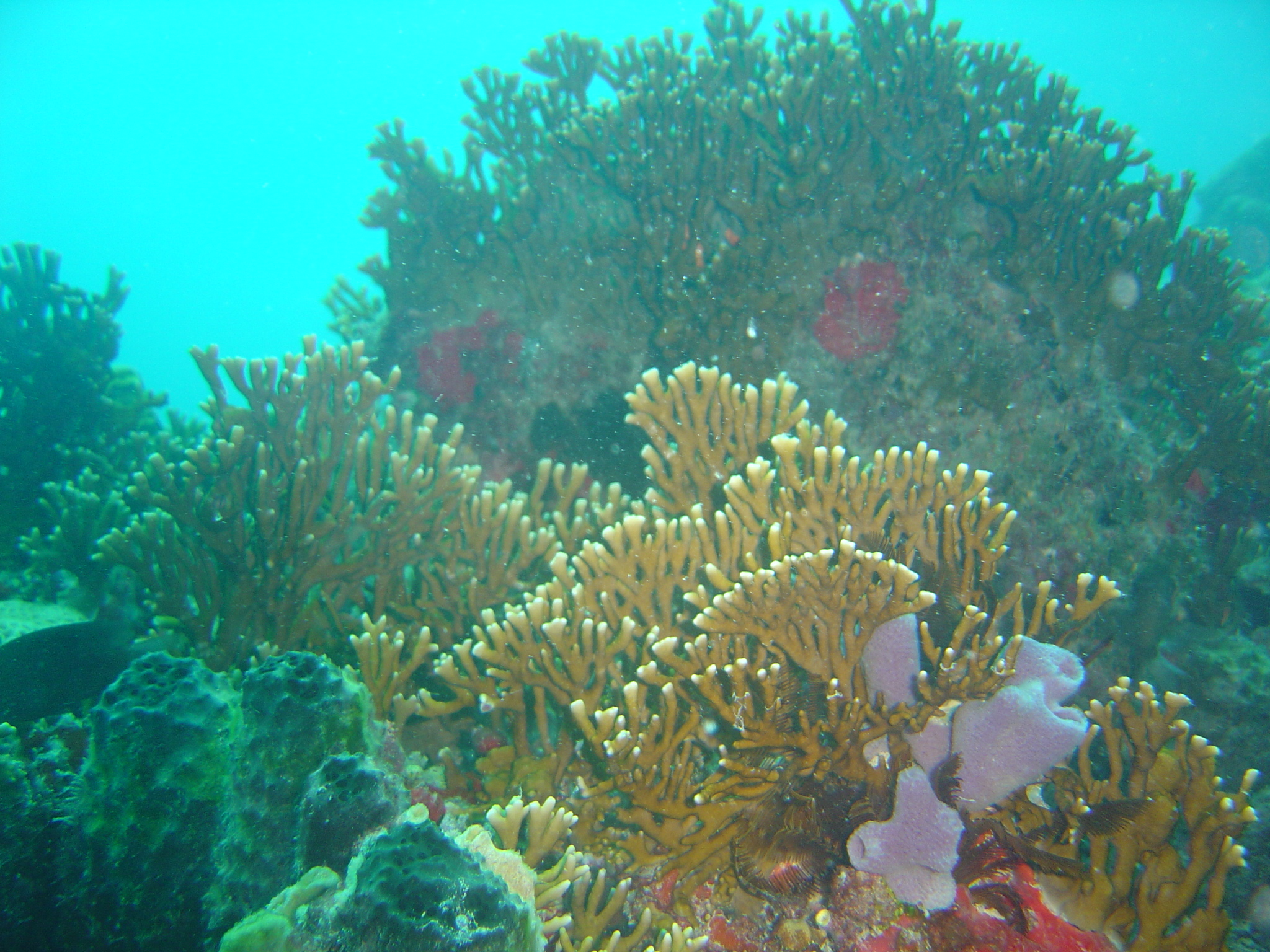
Healthy coral reefs

Jamaica, an island located within the Caribbean Sea, known for being a popular tourist destination because of its pristine white sand beaches, is now faced with the issue of mass coral depletion. Both environmental and human factors contribute to the destruction of these corals, which inevitably affect Jamaica's environmental sustainability and economy. Actions have been put in place to counteract the negative consequences associated with the loss of the corals, which act as a symbol of hope for the revival of Jamaica's environment.

Human behavior has a large impact on Jamaica's 479 square miles of coral reefs, which hosts 60 different species of coral. These reefs are a major tourist attraction for the country, accounting for 27% of its GDP. Due to Jamaica's economic reliance on its coastal reserves, the degradation of the coral reefs is much higher because of continuous habitat destruction.

== Extent ==
Along Jamaica's 894 km (556 mi) of coastline are 763 km^{2} (295 mi^{2}) of coral reefs as of 2014. However, the reefs were once much larger. About 85% of Jamaica's coral reefs were lost between 1980–2000. Coral reef distribution on the northern coast of Jamaica extends from Morant Point in the east to Negril in the west. On the southern coast, the reefs are more restricted, occurring mostly on the eastern part of the continental shelf near Old Harbour and Port Royal. Reefs on the southern coast outside this area are small with a patchy distribution.

== Coral diversity ==
Various species of hard coral are found in Jamaican reefs, including the following families:

- Acroporidae (staghorn corals)
- Agariciidae (cactus and lettuce corals)
- Astrocoeniidae
- Caryophylliidae
- Dendrophylliidae
- Meandrinidae
- Mussidae
- Oculinidae
- Pocilloporidae
- Poritidae
- Rhizangiidae
- Siderastreidae

== Causes of decline ==
The coral reefs are under threat due to environmental issues such as overfishing, pollution, hurricanes, and disease. Since the beginning of their moderation in 1972, Jamaica's coral reef cover has declined more than 50%. In 2005, up to 95% of the coral was bleached in some locations.

=== Coral bleaching ===
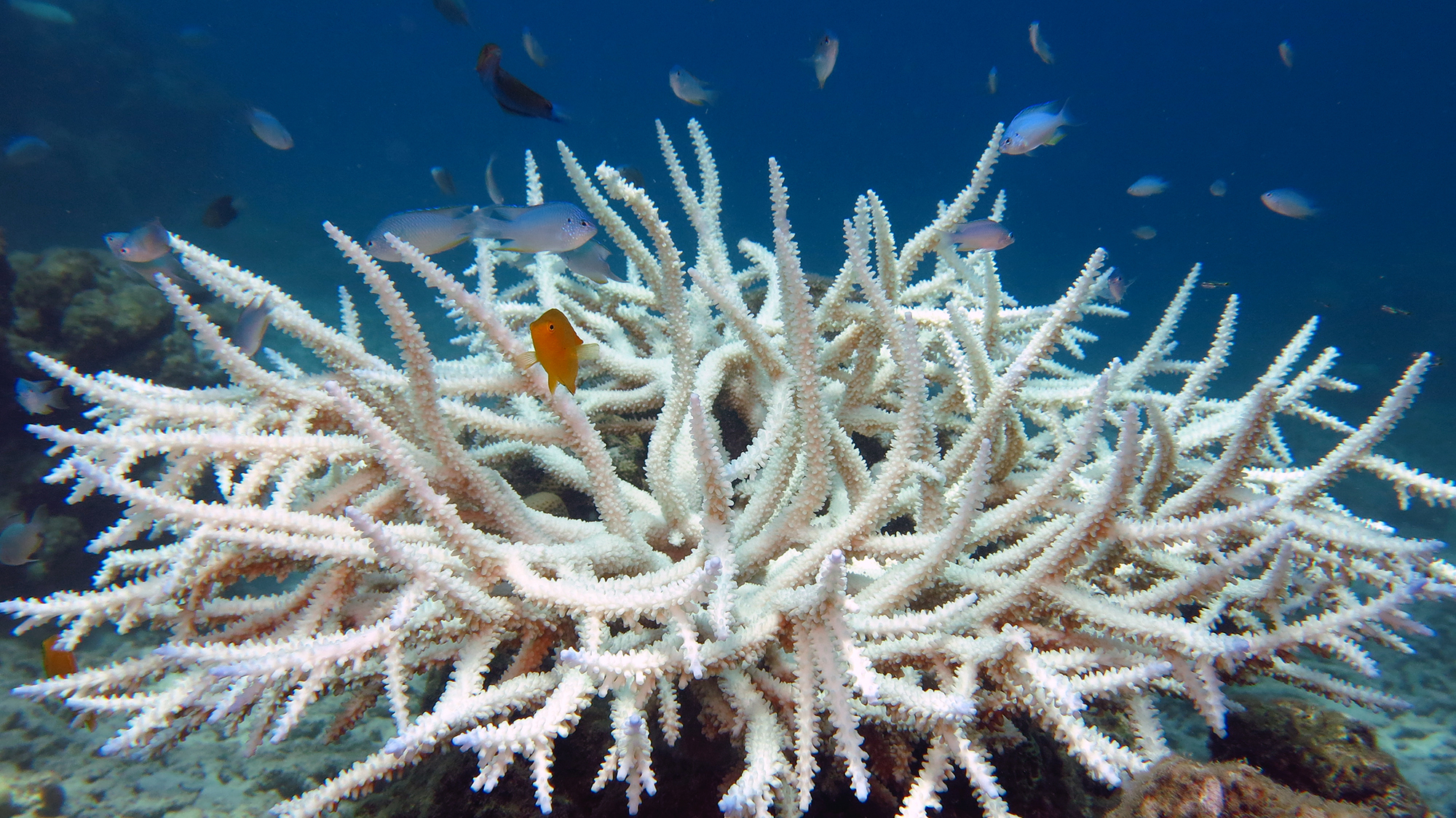
Example of coral bleaching phenomenon

Rising levels of carbon dioxide in the atmosphere directly link to increases in sea temperatures, which have been seen to have adverse effects on coral health. Climate change is a driver of coral bleaching which results from sea surface temperatures rising above normal levels, thus forcing coral polyps to discharge the algae they shared an endosymbiotic relationship with. Tropical corals prefer warmer waters and usually reside close to the surface at their maximum thermal limit, therefore when sea temperatures begin to rise above the normal scale corals become stressed. Once environmental conditions become unfavorable, the corals undergo this process as a short-term solution of survival, but prolonged exposure to said conditions can lead to mass coral deaths. Without their main energy provider, corals will experience starvation and then lose their coloration, resulting in beds of white "bleached" corals.

=== Pollution ===
Sewage pollution has led to eutrophication which results in an abundance of nutrients for microalgal populations to bloom. The United Nations Environmental Program determined that 85% of the sewage entering the Caribbean ocean is untreated. This raw sewage contains dissolved inorganic nutrients, pathogens, heavy metals, and toxins that can cause coral bleaching, disease, increased mortality, and decreased coral growth. A study concluded that increased nutrients such as, inorganic nitrogen and phosphorus, doubled the probability of coral diseases and tripled the probability of bleaching. An increase of inorganic nitrogen was also linked to the presence of pathogens which can lead to coral mortality. The heavy metals prevent respiration and nerve communication within the coral which also leads to coral mortality.

==== Ocean acidification ====
Another consequence of global warming is ocean acidification. CO_{2} dissolves into the seawater thus changing its chemical composition; this new addition of carbonic acid shifts the pH value lower, making it more acidic. Ocean acidification adversely affects corals by affecting the rate at which they can generate their skeletal structures. The basic constituent in a coral's skeleton structure is calcium carbonate which breaks down in the presence of acid. The carbon cycle then becomes disrupted and as a result there is a reduction in the concentration of carbonate ions in the seawater. Marine calcification is now inversely affected which impacts calcifying organisms such as corals as it now becomes harder to build and form their calcium carbonate structures. Without a supportive skeleton, corals will naturally be more frail and easily damaged during storm surges, while the rate of growth and recovery are both slowed. The corals also become weaker, and more susceptible to disease which significantly takes a toll on the resilience of the reefs.

=== Hurricanes ===
As sea surface temperatures rise, low pressure systems that pass over areas of warmer water are fueled by the excess heat, forming into tropical depressions and then further into high intensity hurricanes. These systems affect wave patterns and seawater movements which can cause severe damage to shallow water corals. Reefs consisting of more fragile coral structures will be more vulnerable to the destructive strengths of currents generated from storm surge swells, and result in mass coral colony wipeouts when high category hurricanes hit the island. During storms, sediments and debris can also gather in areas that could have been perfect for coral settlements, but instead become unsuitable and remain barren.

Major hurricane events include Hurricane Allen in 1980, Hurricane Gilbert in 1988, and Hurricane Ivan in 2004. In 2005, there were a record breaking 26 storms recorded that caused 26 events of bleaching in 16 of Jamaica's coral reef sites. The hurricanes affected 68% of Jamaica's coral reefs and 38% of those corals later died. In September 2005, up to 95% of Jamaica's corals had bleached, but only 50% recovered later. As a result of the 2005 hurricane, microalgal blooms took over where the corals once were.

=== Invasive species ===
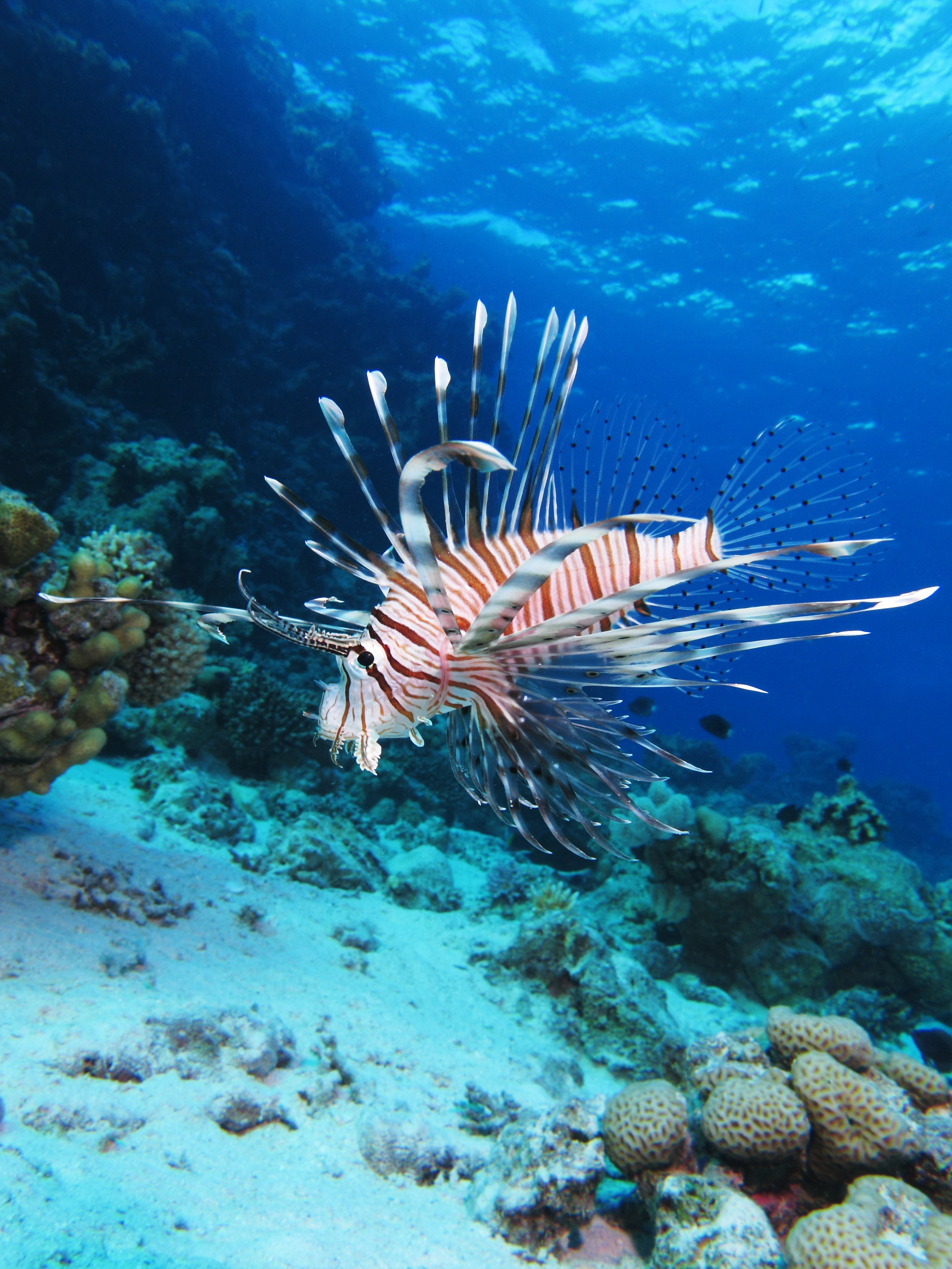
Invasive species of lion-fish threatens coral reefs

The invasive species of lion-fish pose a serious threat to the sustainability of Jamaica's coral reefs as marine ecosystems become compromised with their rapid growth in population. These species of lion-fish, more specifically the Pterois volitans and Pterois miles, are not native to the Caribbean sea waters but instead originated in the Indo-Pacific. The very first reported sightings of the invasion of lion-fish in the Caribbean occurred in the 1980s off the coast of Florida. It is speculated that these fish entered Atlantic and Caribbean waterways due to aquarium releases, where people would set the species free in the sea after growing too big for the tank and rapidly multiplying.

Due to the fact that Jamaican reefs are not the lion-fishes' natural habitat there are no known predators in the area, thereby contributing to their increasing population and inevitably affecting the ecosystem. The lion-fishes' diet is not limited to any one species of fish and their carnivorous eating habits are detrimental to Jamaica's coral reefs as they feed upon the herbivores responsible for keeping algae growth levels in check. Without proper algae regulation there could be a massive overgrowth of algae which blocks out sunlight thus preventing reefs from in turn producing oxygen through photosynthesis. Even the presence of one lone lion-fish was found to cause a 79% reduction in the recruitment of the area's native reef fishes, and its impact is further amplified by the fact that they also breed at a much faster rate than native fish, with females laying up to 2 million eggs per year each. In as little as 5 weeks, one lion-fish also has the ability to wipeout 80% of young reef fish, thereby preventing the flourishing of species of fish that are essential to maintaining healthy corals.

=== Aqua tourism ===
Tourism is an essential aspect of Jamaica's economy, but can also be unintentionally harmful to the environment when tourists are not taught how to properly care for the island's ecosystems. Snorkeling and recreational diving are just some of the few activities tourists normally take part in and sometimes their actions can become detrimental to the corals. Without knowing any better, people swim up to the corals to touch them or snap off pieces for keep sakes which can lead to coral bleaching, as the corals become stressed and expel their algae. By swimming too close the reefs, tourists can also stir up sand and sediments with their flippers thus depositing them on the corals and inevitably hindering the process of photosynthesis.

=== Overfishing ===
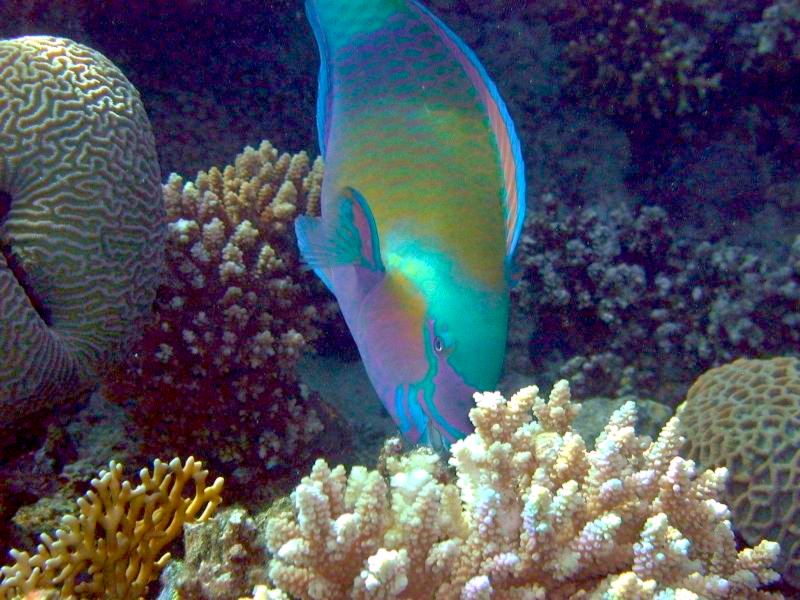
Parrotfish eating algae off of coral reef

Jamaica's coral reefs house 135 different species of fish. Between 1995 and 1998, fishing licenses increased by 68% for the Montego Bay Marine Park where 69% of fishers rely on fishing as their full-time income. In 1970 on Jamaica's north coast, trap fishermen set 1800 traps which was at least two times above estimated sustainability levels. Fish density dwindled to 9.8 fish per 100 m^{2} between 2001 and 2006. Overfishing has reduced the herbivorous fish that keep algae populations in check and it has caused a phase shift from coral reefs to algae reefs. Today, algae covers 24% of the reefs where corals once stood. By 1960, fish biomass was reduced by 80% due to overfishing. Fish that are vital to coral reef survival, such as the parrot fish, have been driven to near extinction in some regions. In addition, overfishing has also been linked to the disappearance of the black sea urchin, Diadema antillarum, which also helped to reduce microalgal presence.

Overfishing causes an unacceptable reduction in the population of fish which are essential to the proper maintenance of the reefs, such as grazers. Fish such as the native parrot fish help keep algae levels down so that the corals are not completely encased in their bloom. It has been found that there is a direct link between thriving parrotfish populations and thriving coral populations in Caribbean reefs, with islands which have imposed parrotfish fishing bans having the healthiest reefs like Bermuda, and those without which have witnessed major coral declines like Jamaica. Without these essential species of fish, Jamaica's reefs run the risk of having total coral decimation. As a result, it is imperative that bans should be put in place to protect the parrotfish, but that's easier said than done when so many local fishermen rely on catching and selling them to make a livelihood.

=== Disease ===
The Caribbean's coral reefs have been increasingly becoming diseased by 20%. Coral diseases can cause tissue damage or it could even destroy the entire colony. In 1980, white-band disease killed 95% of the Acroporid palmata and Acroporid cervicornis colonies which placed them on the Endangered Species Act. A 2010 study concluded that sewage runoff was correlated to the white pox coral disease that destroyed the Acroporid palmata species.

== Rehabilitation efforts ==
With all of these different factors coming into play, Jamaican (and more generally Caribbean) reefs have been affected substantially. Around 9% of the Earth's total coral population resides in the Caribbean, and it is truly saddening that over 50% of that original coral in the region has been destroyed since the 1970s with algal blooms at an all-time high since the 1990s. Jamaica in particular has lost 85% of its coral reefs between 1980 and 1990 mainly due to the chain of unfortunate human and natural disasters that struck the island during that time frame. The state of the corals spurred locals to take action to reverse the damage caused to the reefs. As a result, many new (grassroots-run) fisheries and coral nurseries have been established across Jamaica since around 2009, in an effort to bring back the island's marine ecosystem.

In Ocho Rios, Jamaica a group of local divers have teamed up to start this restoration process and rebuild the reefs through coral gardening. Firstly, corals are broken off into small fragments and then attached to 'underwater clotheslines' where they are left to grow. These simplistic gardening structures allow the corals to regenerate in optimal conditions as their availability to food and sunshine is maximized. During this regrowth period, the corals are frequently cleaned and any creatures that may feed on the immature coral (such as sea snails and fire-worms) are manually removed. Once the coral bit grows to about the size of a human hand, that is a sign that it is ready to my transplanted onto a rocky reef to instigate natural coral reef restoration. This process is extremely labor-intensive and requires patience, but has been seen as effective upon sightings of tropical fish returning to the reefs.

Thanks to this effort, coral populations and fish populations are rising.

== See also ==
- Environmental issues with coral reefs
