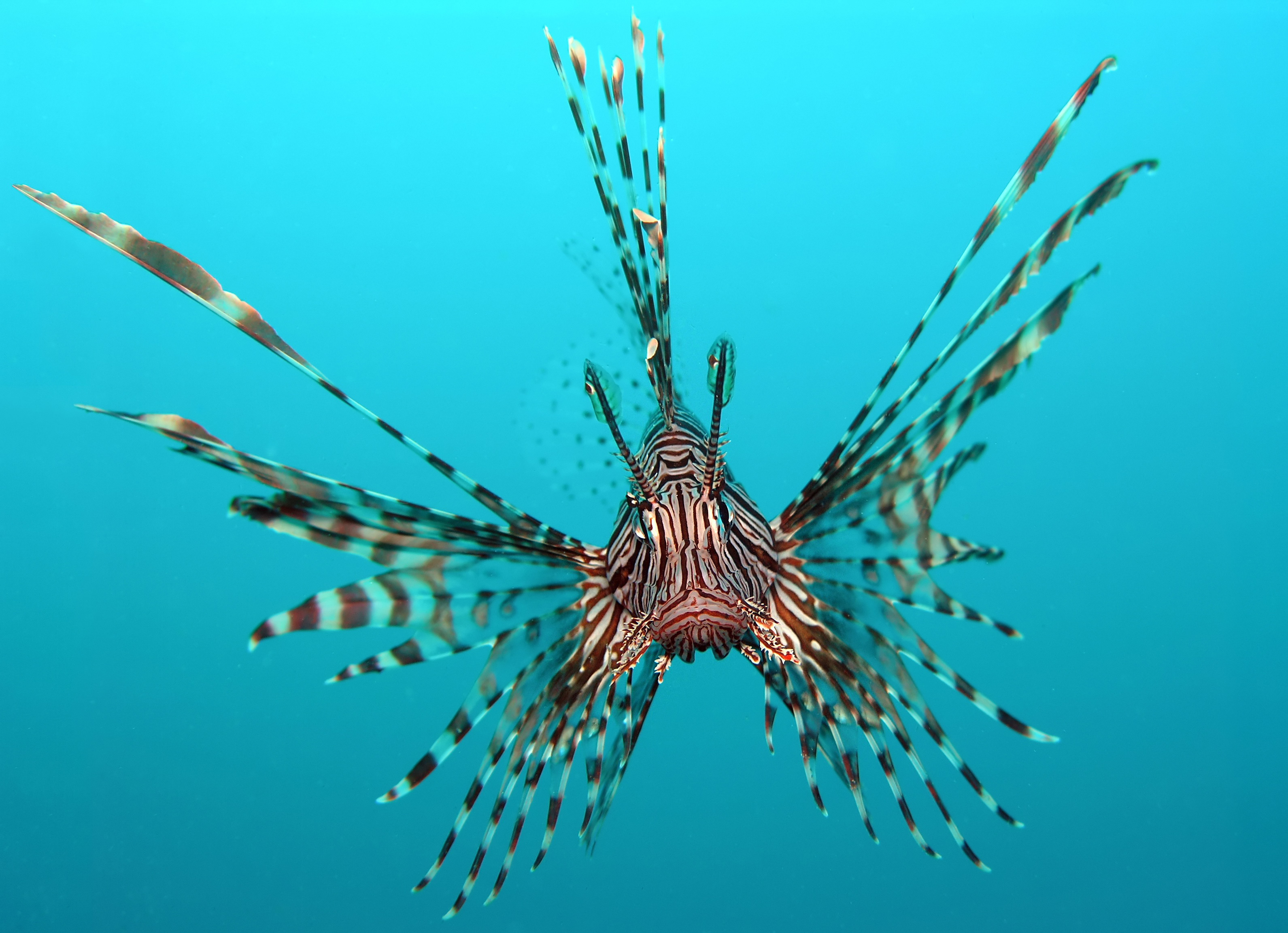

Conservation status
- Least Concern (IUCN 3.1)

Scientific classification
- Kingdom: Animalia
- Phylum: Chordata
- Class: Actinopterygii
- Order: Perciformes
- Family: Scorpaenidae
- Genus: Pterois
- Species: P. volitans

Binomial name
- Pterois volitans (Linnaeus, 1758)

= Red lionfish =

Species of fish

The red lionfish (Pterois volitans) is a venomous coral reef fish in the family Scorpaenidae, order Scorpaeniformes. It is mainly native to the Indo-Pacific region, but has become an invasive species in the Caribbean Sea, as well as along the East Coast of the United States and East Mediterranean and also found in Brazil at Fernando de Noronha.

P. volitans and a similar relative, Pterois miles, have both been deemed invasive species. Red lionfish are clad in white stripes alternated with red, maroon or brown stripes. Adults in this species can grow as large as 47 cm (18.5 in) in length, making it one of the largest species of lionfish in the ocean, while juveniles are typically shorter than 1 inch (2.5 cm). The average red lionfish lives around 10 years. As with many species within the family Scorpaenidae, it has large, venomous spines on its dorsal fin (13) as well as other venomous spines on its pelvic fins (2) and anal fins (3). It is these fins together with the other long non-venomous fins which create an appearance similar to a mane, giving it the common name "lionfish". The dorsal spines deter most potential predators. Lionfish reproduce monthly and are able to quickly disperse during their larval stage for expansion of their invasive region. No definitive predators of the lionfish are known, and many organizations are promoting the harvest and consumption of lionfish in efforts to prevent further increases in the already high population densities.

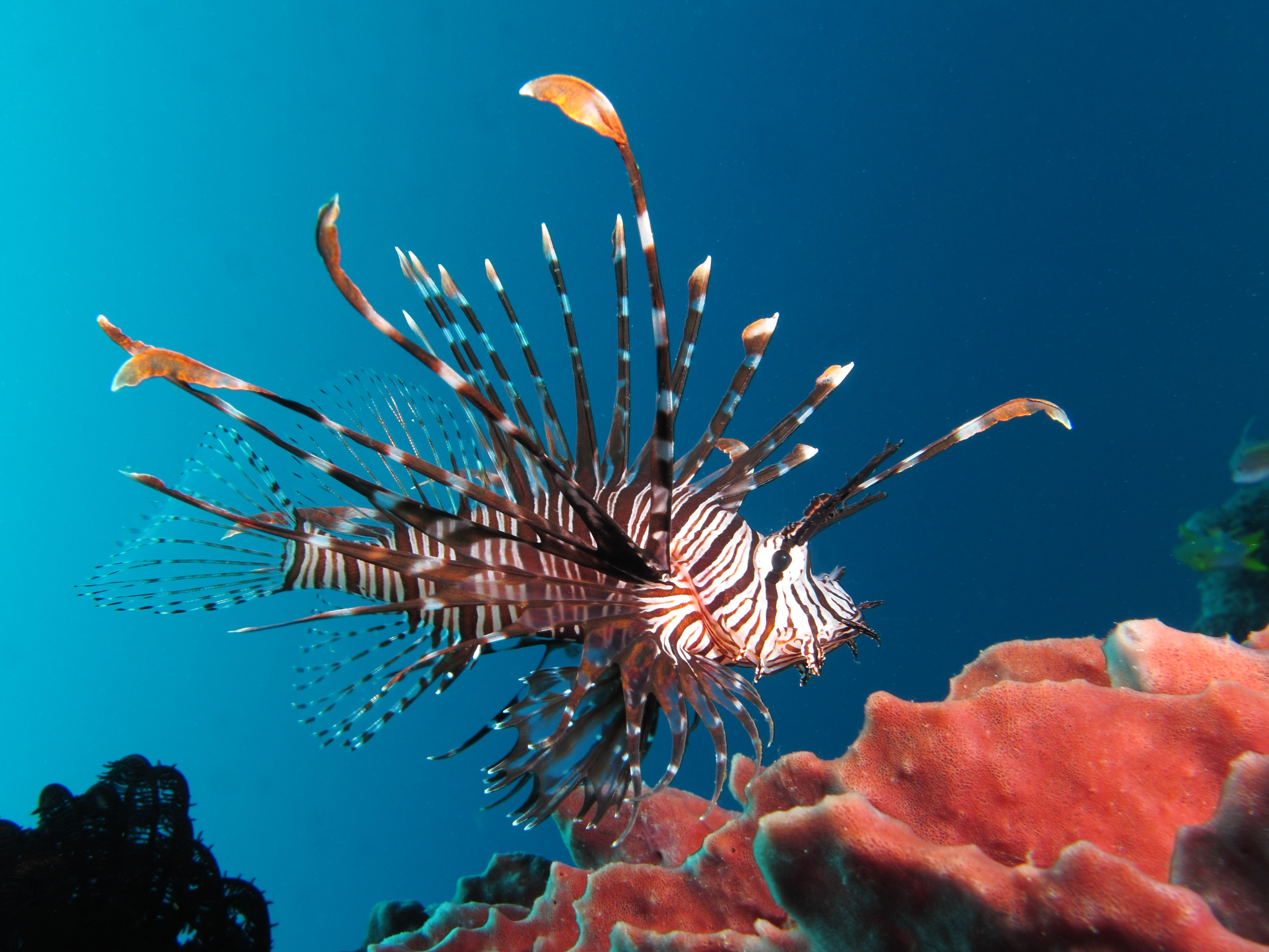
Red lionfish in Indonesia

== Taxonomy ==
The red lionfish was first formally described in 1758 as Gasterosteus volitans by Carl Linnaeus in the 10th edition of his Systema Naturae in which he gave the type locality as Ambon Island in Indonesia. In 1856 the French naturalist Eugène Anselme Sébastien Léon Desmarest designated Scorpaena volitans, which had been named by Bloch in 1787 and which was the same as Linnaeus's 1758 Gasterosteus volitans, as the type species of the genus Pterois which had been originally described by Oken in 1817. A molecular study of this species, the common lionfish, the luna lionfish and Russell's lionfish found that the common lionfishes in the western Indian Ocean formed a lineage, that a second lineage consisted of both the luna lionfish and Russell's lionfish, suggesting these two taxa are conspecific, while the red lionfish formed a third lineage which appeared to have genetic contributions from the other two lineages. This suggests that the red lionfish arose from hybrids between P. miles and P. russelii sensu lato. The specific name volitans means "flying", presumed to be a reference to the large pectoral fins resembling wings.

== Distribution ==
P. volitans is native to the Indo-Pacific region, including the western and central Pacific and off the coast of western Australia. However, the species has been introduced into the Western Atlantic, becoming an invasive species there as well as in the northern Gulf of Mexico and the Caribbean.

Red lionfish swimming in a fish tank (video)

== Life history and behavior ==
=== Reproduction ===
They are mainly a solitary species and courting is the only time they aggregate, generally one male with several females. Both P. volitans and P. miles are gonochoristic and only show sexual dimorphism during reproduction. Similar courtship behaviors are observed in all Pterois species, including circling, sidewinding, following, and leading. The lionfish are mostly nocturnal, leading to the behaviors typically around nightfall and continuing through the night. After courtship, the female releases two egg masses, fertilized by the male before floating to the surface. The embryos secrete an adhesive mucus allowing them to attach to nearby intertidal rocks and corals before hatching. During one mating session, females can lay up to 30,000 eggs. However, it has been observed that females will lay more eggs in the warmer months.

=== Predators and prey ===
In its invasive range, few predators of the lionfish have been documented. Most larger Atlantic and Caribbean fish and sharks that should be able to eat the lionfish have not recognized them as prey, likely due to the novelty of the fish in the invaded areas. Lionfish have, however, been found in the stomachs of Nassau and tiger groupers in the Bahamas, but the former is critically endangered and therefore highly unlikely to provide significant predation. In its native range, two species of moray eels were found preying on lionfish. The Bobbit worm, an ambush predator, has been filmed preying upon lionfish in Indonesia; similar species inhabit the Caribbean.

The lionfish themselves are voracious feeders and have outcompeted and filled the niche of the overfished snapper and grouper. They are known to feed mostly on crustaceans (such as amphipods, isopods, shrimps, and crabs), as well as other invertebrates, and small fishes, which include juveniles of their own species. When hunting, they corner prey using their large fins, then use their quick reflexes to swallow the prey whole. They hunt primarily from late afternoon to dawn. Among their tactics is a "persistent-pursuit strategy" in which they capture fish twice as fast as them in spite of lacking crypsis by exploiting the periodic pauses in swimming of their prey with their uninterrupted slow approach. When they get within 9 cm, they strike using a "rapid expansion of the rostrum and low pressure within the buccal cavity to draw in prey that are immediately in front of the mouth".

High rates of prey consumption, a wide variety of prey, and increasing abundance of the fish lead to concerns the fish may have a very active role in the already declining trend of fish densities. As the fish become more abundant, they are becoming a threat to the fragile ecosystems they have invaded. Between outcompeting similar fish and having a varied diet, the lionfish is drastically changing and disrupting the food chains holding the marine ecosystems together. As these chains are disrupted, declining densities of other fish populations are found, as well as declines in the overall diversity of coral reef areas.

=== Early life history and dispersal ===
Although little is known about the larval stage of the lionfish, some traits of the larvae include a large head, a long, triangular snout, long, serrated head spines, a large pelvic spine, and coloration only in the pelvic fins. Larvae hatch 36 hours after fertilization. They are good swimmers and can eat small ciliates just four days after conception. The larval stage is the shortest stage of the lionfish's life, with a duration of about one month.

=== Venom ===
Lionfish venomous dorsal spines are used purely for defense. They are slow swimmers, so when threatened, the fish turns these spines towards its attacker, even if this means swimming upside down. However, its sting is usually not fatal to humans. Envenomed humans will experience extreme pain, and possibly headaches, vomiting, and breathing difficulties. A common treatment is soaking the afflicted area in hot water, as very few hospitals carry specific treatments. However, immediate emergency medical attention is strongly recommended, as some people are more sensitive to the venom than others.

== As an invasive species ==
Two of the five species of Pterois, P. volitans and P. miles, have established themselves as significant invasive species off the East Coast of the United States and in the Caribbean. About 93% of the invasive lionfish population is the red lionfish. The red lionfish was likely first introduced off the Florida coast in the early to mid-1980s, almost certainly from the aquarium trade. Adult lionfish specimens are now found along the East Coast from Cape Hatteras, North Carolina, to Florida, and in Bermuda, the Bahamas, and throughout the Caribbean, including the Turks and Caicos, Haiti, Cuba, the Dominican Republic, Guadeloupe, Puerto Rico, St. Croix, Belize, Honduras, Aruba, Cayman Islands, Colombia, Saint Lucia, St. Martin, and Mexico. It also is in Brazil at Fernando de Noronha.
