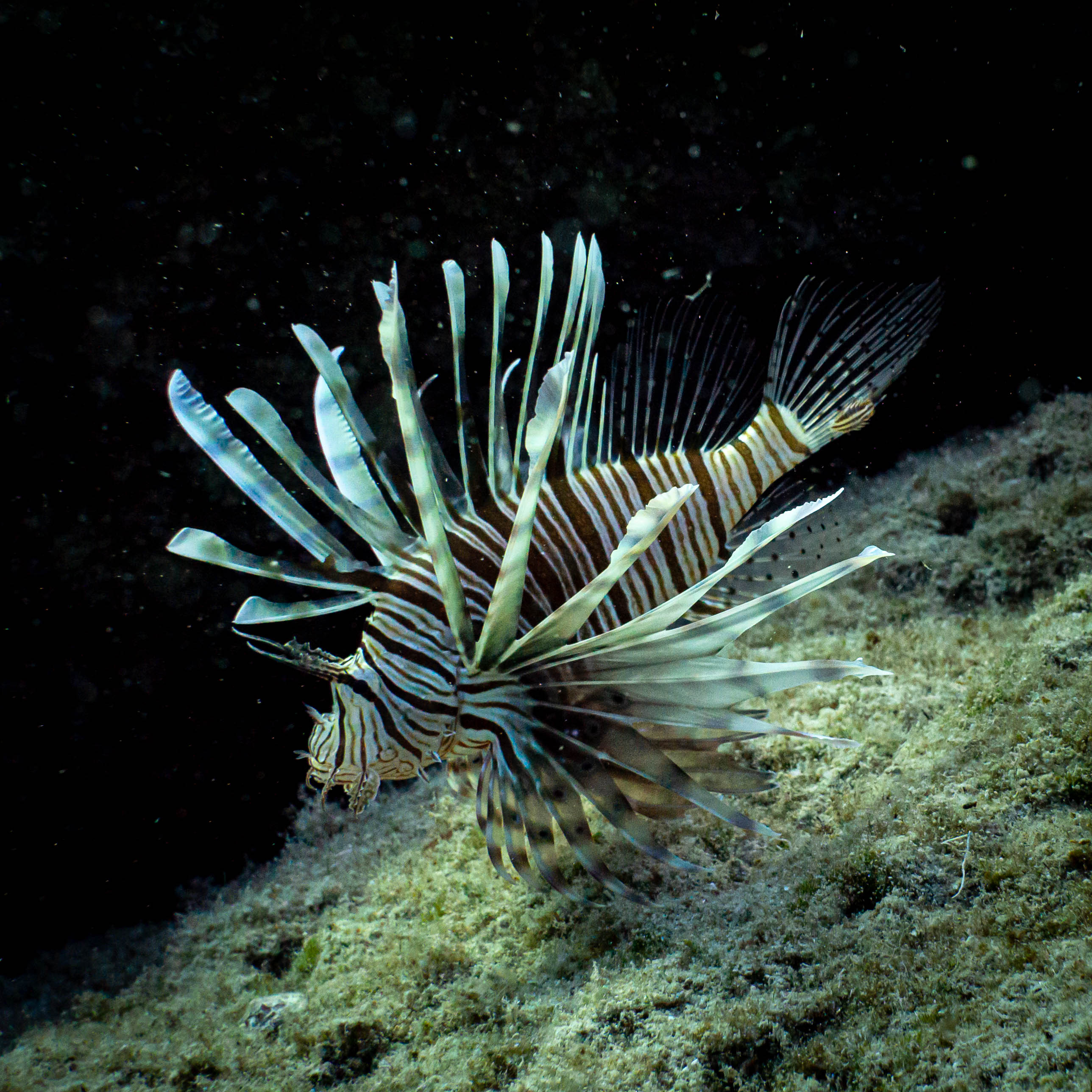
- In the Cyclades

Conservation status
- Least Concern (IUCN 3.1)

Scientific classification
- Kingdom: Animalia
- Phylum: Chordata
- Class: Actinopterygii
- Order: Perciformes
- Family: Scorpaenidae
- Genus: Pterois
- Species: P. miles

Binomial name
- Pterois miles (J. W. Bennett, 1828)
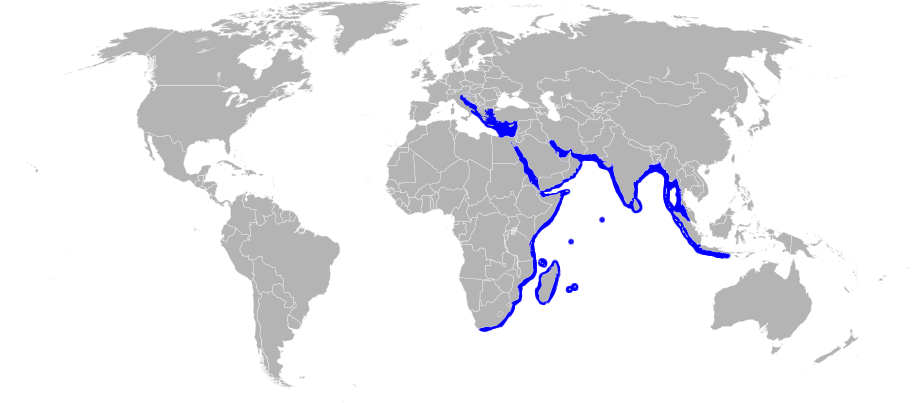

Synonyms
- Scorpaena miles Bennett, 1828; Pterois muricata Cuvier, 1829

= Pterois miles =

Species of fish

Pterois miles, the devil firefish or common lionfish, is a species of ray-finned fish native to the western Indo-Pacific region. It is frequently confused with its close relative, the red lionfish (Pterois volitans). The scientific name is from Greek pteron, meaning "wing", and Latin miles, meaning "soldier".

== Taxonomy ==
Pterois miles was first formally described as Scorpaena miles in 1828 by the British naturalist John Whitchurch Bennett, with the type locality given as the south coast of Sri Lanka. A molecular study of this species, the red lionfish, the luna lionfish and Russell's lionfish found that the common lionfishes in the western Indian Ocean formed a lineage, that a second lineage consisted of both the luna lionfish and Russell's lionfish, suggesting these two taxa are conspecific, while the red firefish formed a third lineage which appeared to have genetic contributions from the other two lineages. This suggests that the red lionfish arose from hybrids between P. miles and P. russelii sensu lato.

== Etymology ==
The specific name miles is Latin for "soldier"; Bennett did not explain this, but it may be that the red colour reminded him of the red tunics worn by British soldiers in the 19th century.

== Description ==
The common lionfish grows up to 35 cm (14 in) in length. The dorsal fin has 13 long, strong spines and 9-11 soft rays, and the anal fin has three long spines and six or seven soft rays. The dorsal fin appears feathery and the pectoral fins are wing-like with separate broad, smooth rays. These fish vary in colour from reddish to tan or grey and have numerous thin, dark, vertical bars on their heads and bodies. Its head is less angular than that of P. volitans.

== Behaviour ==
The common lionfish is mainly nocturnal and hides in crevices during the daytime. It feeds on fish and small crustaceans. It has few predators, probably because of its venomous spines, but larger lionfish do prey on smaller ones. Moray eels have shown resistance to the spines and it was reported that lion fish are included in their diet. The bluespotted cornetfish (Fistularia commersonii) has been shown to feed on it, as also do groupers in the Bahamas.

== Distribution and habitat ==
P. miles is native to the Indian Ocean, from the Red Sea, to South Africa, and to Indonesia. Recorded first in 1991 in the Mediterranean Sea off Israel, following entry via the Suez Canal, it is now common in the eastern Basin, with recent observations in the Sicily channel. It is also now present off the east coast of the United States and in the Caribbean Sea where is regarded as an invasive species.

It is very similar in appearance to P. volitans, which does not occur in the Red Sea. P. miles is usually found in areas with crevices or lagoons, often on the outer slopes of coral reefs. Moray eels have recently been identified as natural predators of P. miles in its native habitat in the Red Sea. Some grouper species and reef sharks are also its predators.

== Hazards ==
The fin spines are highly venomous and have caused death to humans in some reported cases. Despite this, a sting from this species is rarely fatal to humans. Nevertheless, a sting can cause extreme pain, vomiting, convulsion, minor paralysis, and breathing difficulties. Therefore, immediate emergency medical attention is strongly recommended, even for healthy adults who have been stung, as some people are more sensitive to the venom than others after being stung, and symptoms and reactions from the venom vary in severity from person to person.

== Gallery ==
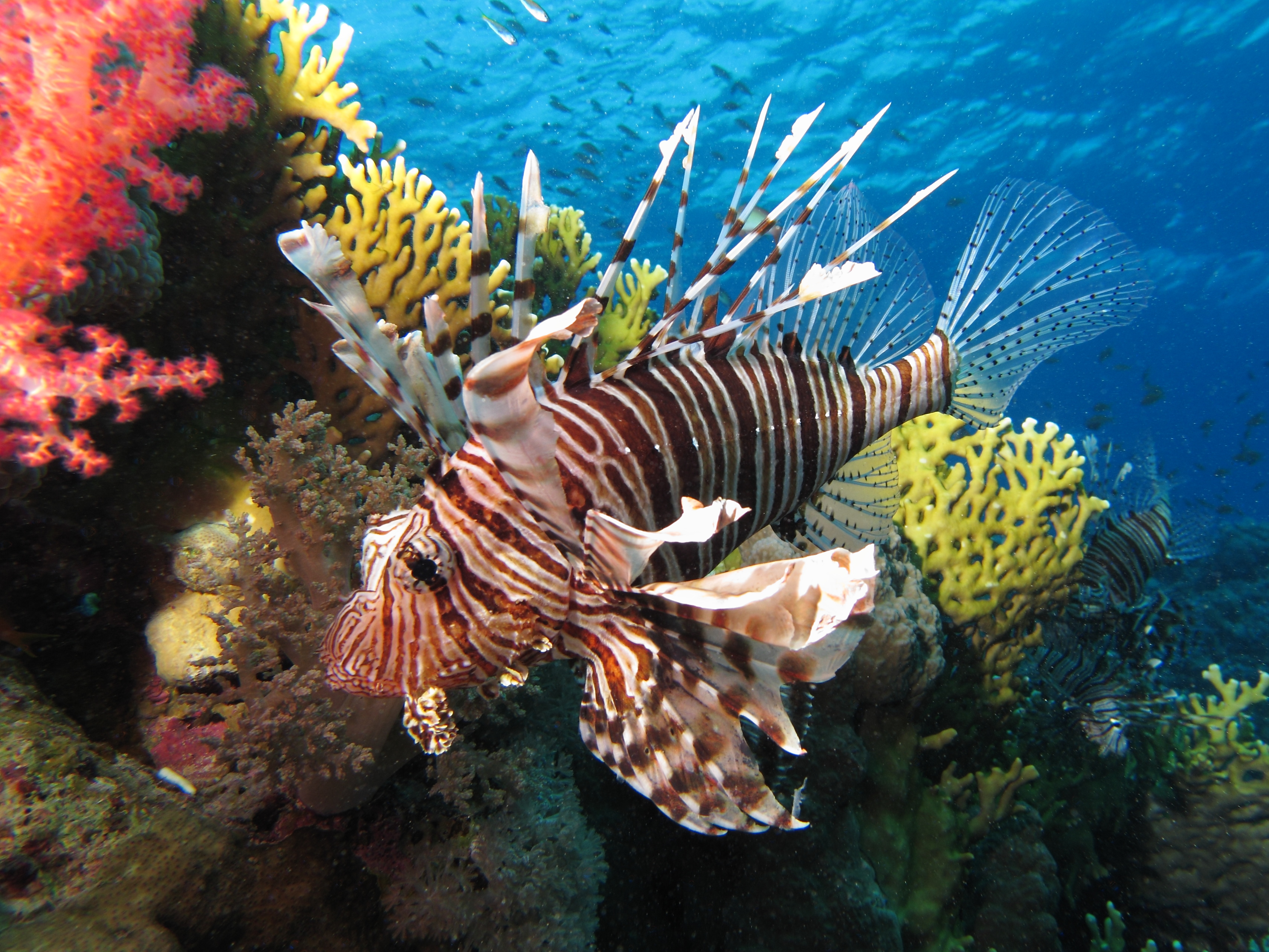
Common lionfish near Dunraven wreck (Red Sea)

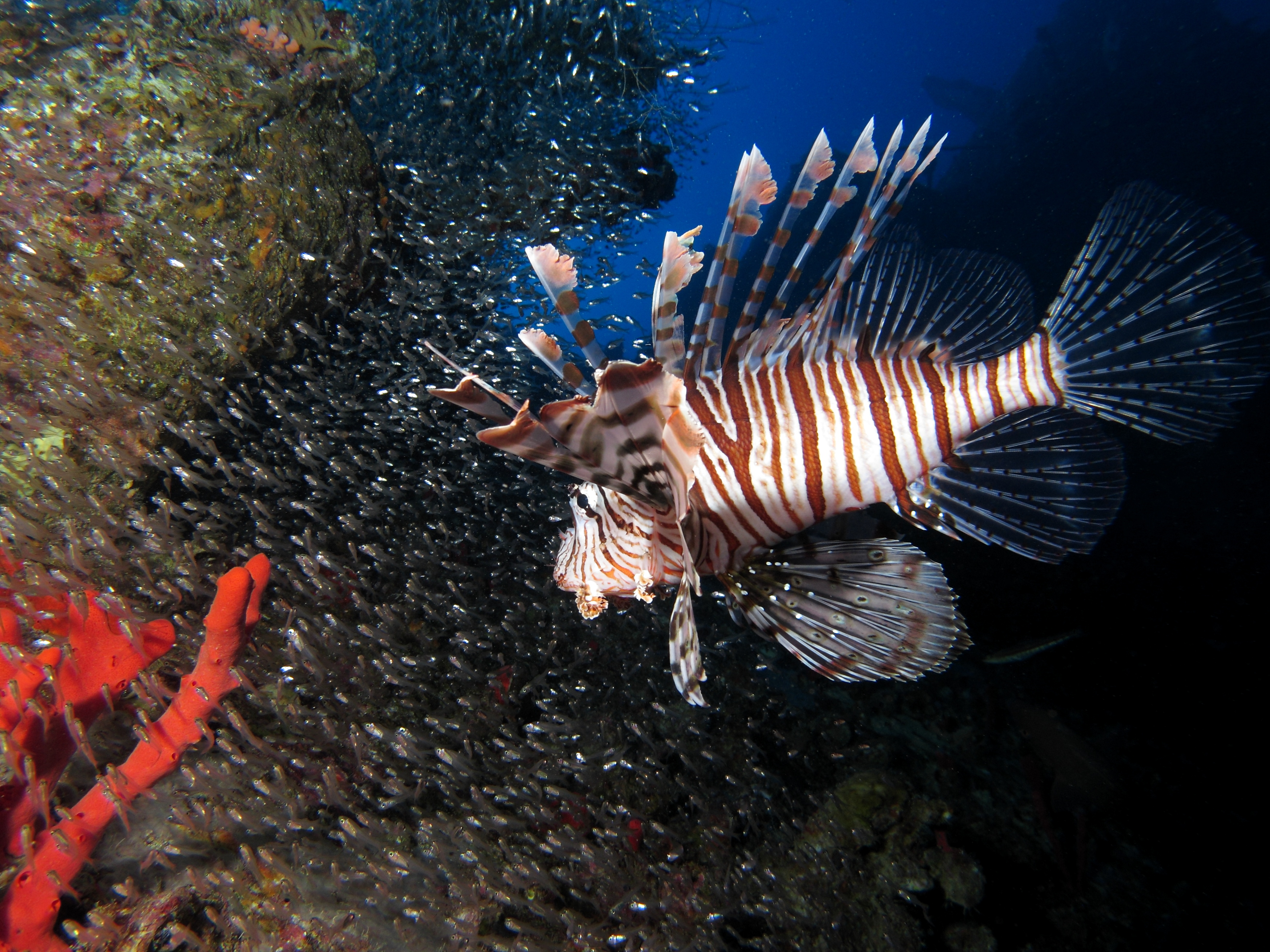
Common lionfish hunting glassfish at El Mina wreck (Red Sea)

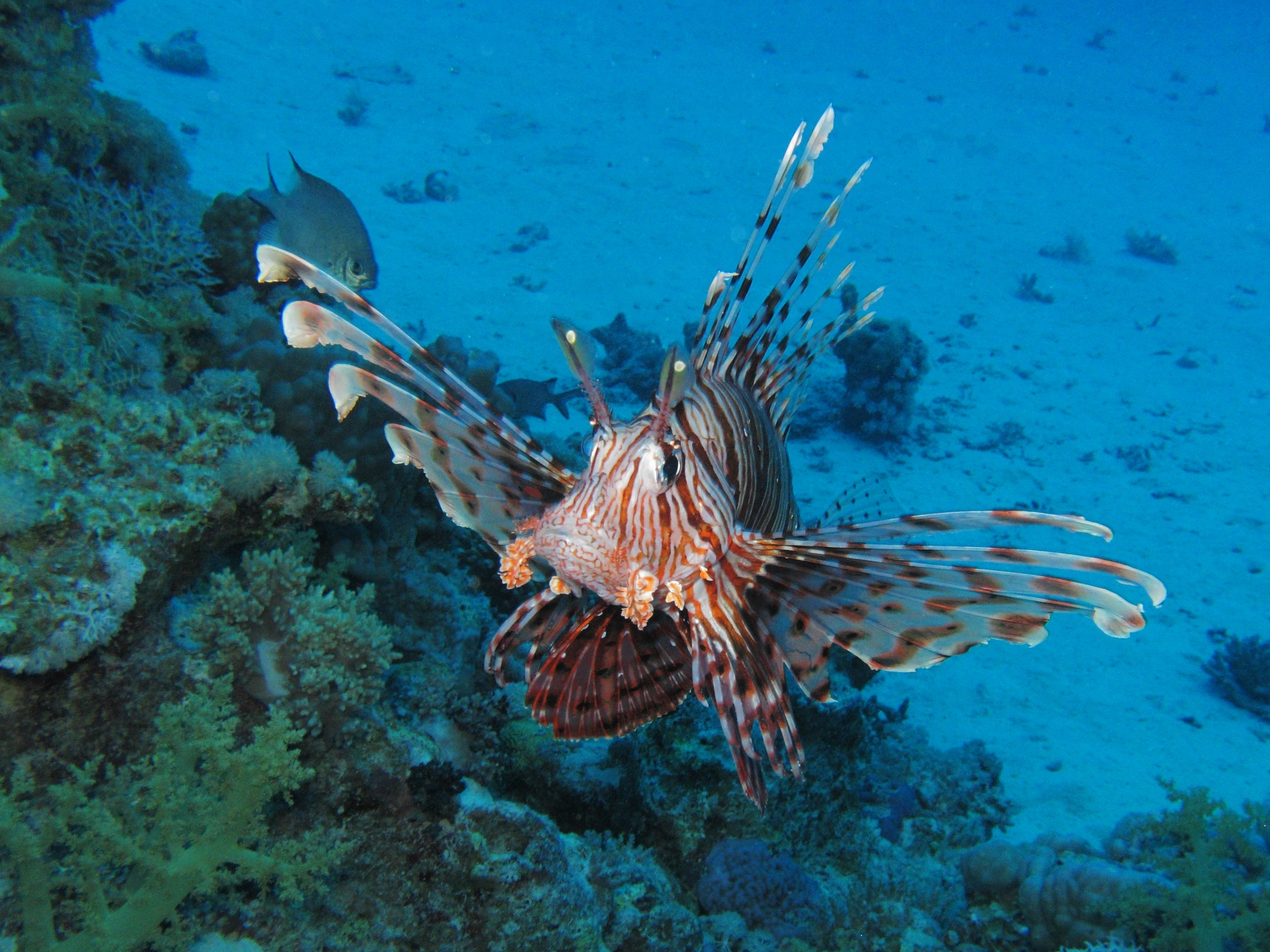
Common lionfish at Sataya reef (Red Sea)

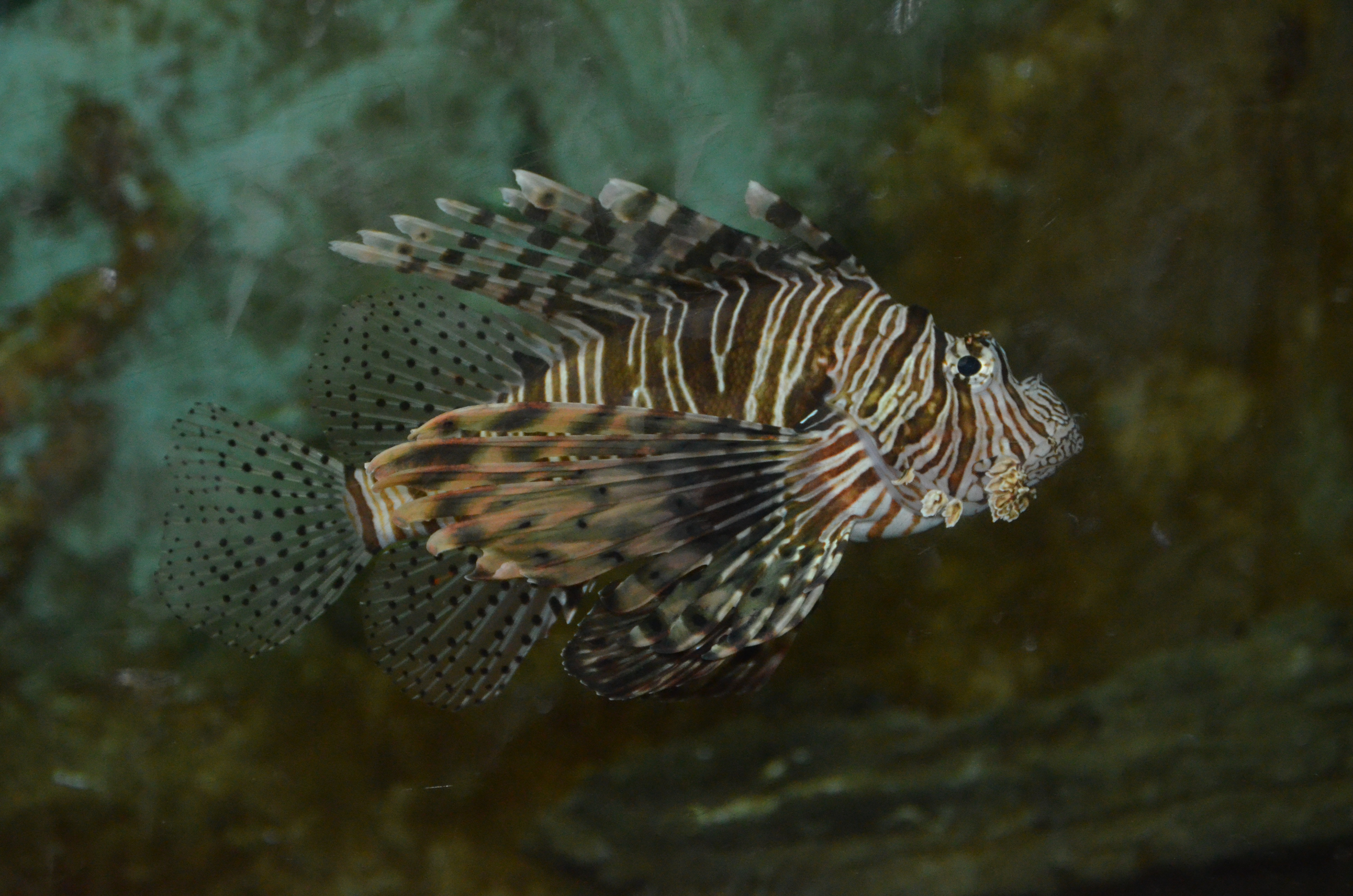
Pterois miles at Alexandria Aquarium
