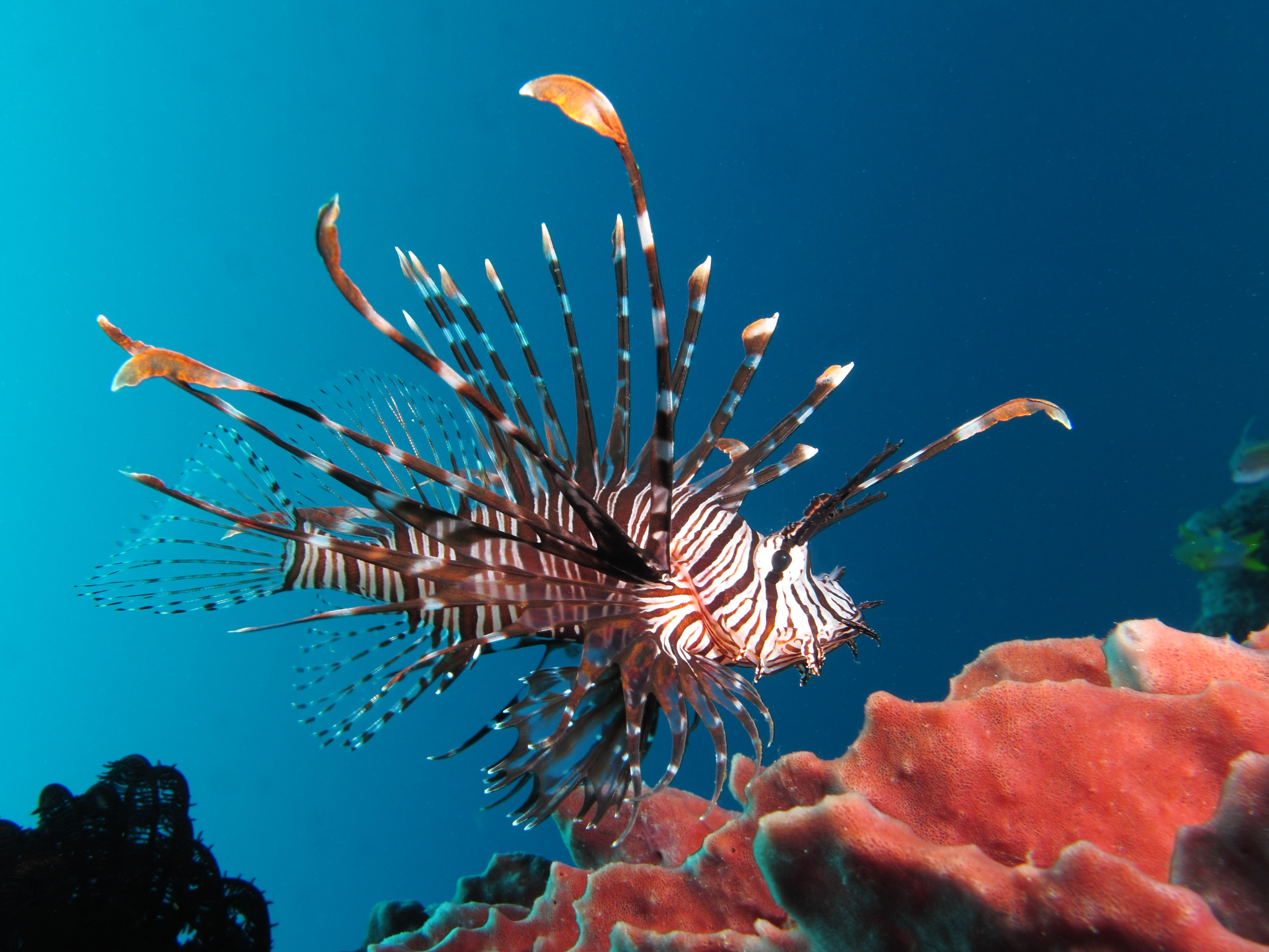
- Pterois volitans

Scientific classification
- Kingdom: Animalia
- Phylum: Chordata
- Class: Actinopterygii
- Division: Teleostei
- Order: Perciformes
- Family: Scorpaenidae
- Subfamily: Pteroinae
- Genus: Pterois; Oken, 1817

Type species
- Scorpaena volitans Bloch, 1787

Synonyms
- Macrochirus Swainson, 1839; Pseudomonopterus Bleeker, 1863; Pteroleptus Swainson, 1839; Pteropterus Swainson, 1839

= Lionfish =

Genus of venomous fish

Lionfish are venomous marine ray-finned fish of the genus Pterois, native to coral reefs of the Indo-Pacific. They are prolific coral fish characterized by conspicuous warning coloration with red or black bands and ostentatious dorsal fins tipped with venomous spines, which are their primary anti-predator defense. Pterois radiata, Pterois volitans and Pterois miles are the most commonly studied species in the genus. Pterois species are popular aquarium fish. P. volitans and P. miles are recent and significant invasive species in the west Atlantic, Caribbean Sea, and Mediterranean Sea.

== Taxonomy ==
Pterois was described as a genus in 1900 by German naturalist, botanist, biologist, and ornithologist Lorenz Oken. In 1856, French naturalist Eugène Anselme Sébastien Léon Desmarest designated Scorpaena volitans, which had been named by Bloch in 1787 and which was the same as Linnaeus's 1758 Gasterosteus volitans, as the type species of the genus.

The related genus Pteropterus has been inconsistently treated as either its own genus or a synonym of Pterois, until 2023, when it was validated after it was discovered that Pterois was not monophyletic at the time.

This genus is classified within the tribe Pteroini of the subfamily Scorpaeninae within the family Scorpaenidae.

=== Etymology ===
The genus name Pterois is based on Georges Cuvier's 1816 French name, "Les Pterois", meaning "fins", which is an allusion to the high dorsal and long pectoral fins.

== Description ==
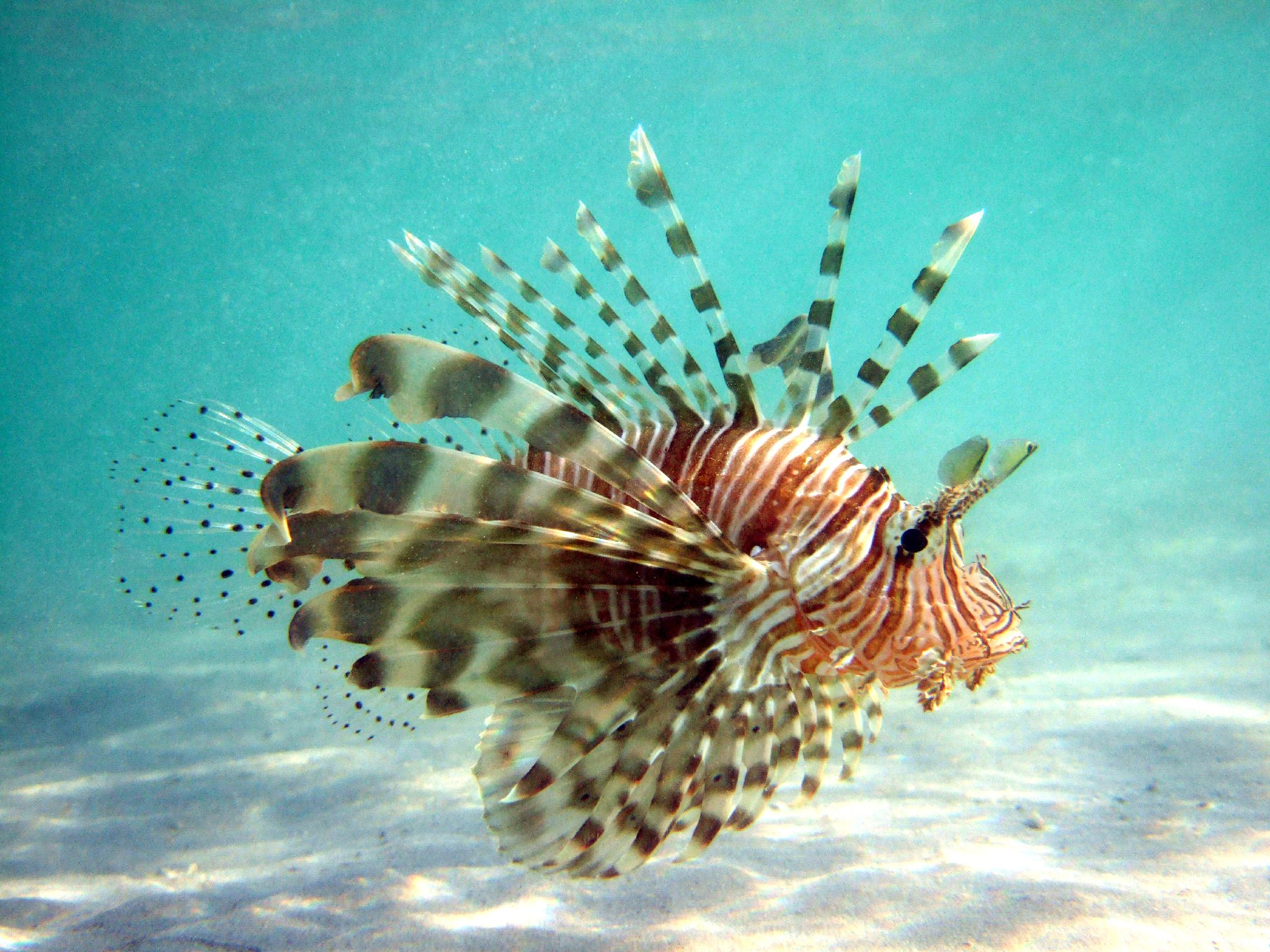
Lionfish have 18 venomous spines total: two pelvic, three anal, and 13 dorsal spines.

According to the National Oceanic and Atmospheric Administration, "lionfish have distinctive brown or maroon, and white stripes or bands covering the head and body. They have fleshy tentacles above their eyes and below the mouth; fan-like pectoral fins; long, separated dorsal spines; 13 dorsal spines; 10–11 dorsal soft rays; three anal spines; and six or seven anal soft rays. An adult lionfish can grow as large as 18 inches."

Juvenile lionfish have a unique tentacle located above their eye sockets that varies in phenotype between species. The evolution of this tentacle is suggested to serve to continually attract new prey; studies also suggest it plays a role in sexual selection.

== Species ==
Currently, 5 recognized species are in the genus Pterois:

Image	Scientific name	Common name	Distribution
Pterois_andover	P. andover (G. R. Allen & Erdmann, 2008)	Andover lionfish	Indonesia and Papua New Guinea and ranges as far as Sabah, Malaysia, and the Philippines
	P. lunulata (Temminck & Schlegel, 1843)	Luna lionfish	Western Pacific Ocean
	P. miles (J. W. Bennett, 1828)	Common Lionfish, Devil firefish	Indian Ocean, from the Red Sea, to South Africa, and to Indonesia
	P. russelii (E. T. Bennett, 1831)	Plaintail turkeyfish, soldier lionfish, Russell's lionfish	Persian Gulf and East Africa to New Guinea, south to Western Australia
	P. volitans (Linnaeus, 1758)	Red lionfish	Indo-Pacific region, Western Atlantic Ocean, Caribbean Sea

Molecular studies and morphological data have indicated that P. lunulata is a junior synonym of P. russelii, and that P. volitans may be a hybrid between P. miles and P. russelii sensu lato.

== Ecology and behavior ==
Pterois species can live from 5 to 15 years and have complex courtship and mating behaviors. Females frequently release two mucus-filled egg clusters, which can contain as many as 15,000 eggs. In total, they can lay up about 2 million eggs per year.

All species are aposematic; they have conspicuous coloration with boldly contrasting stripes and wide fans of projecting spines, advertising their ability to defend themselves.

=== Prey ===
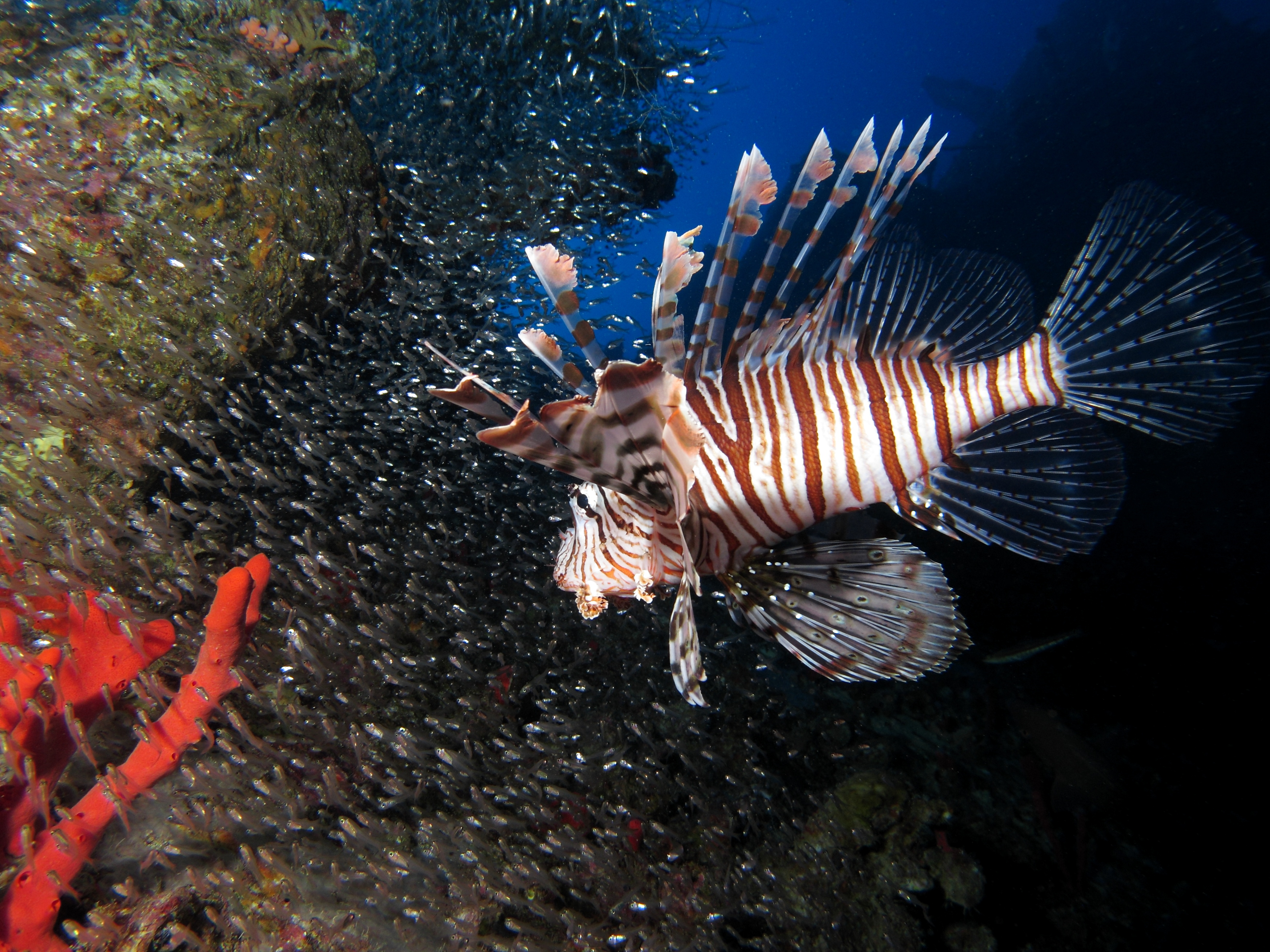
Pterois miles hunting glassfish

Pterois species prey mostly on small fish, invertebrates, and mollusks, with up to six different species of prey found in the gastrointestinal tracts of some specimens. Lionfish feed most actively in the morning; they are skilled hunters, using specialized swim bladder muscles to provide precise control of their location in the water column, allowing them to alter their center of gravity the better to attack prey. They blow jets of water while approaching prey, which serves to confuse them and alter the orientation of the prey so that the smaller fish is facing the lionfish. This results in a higher degree of predatory efficiency, as head-first capture is easier for the lionfish. The lionfish then spreads its large pectoral fins and swallows its prey in a single motion.

=== Predators and parasites ===
Moray eels, bluespotted cornetfish, barracuda, and large groupers have been observed preying on lionfish. Sharks are also believed to be capable of preying on lionfish with no ill effects from their spines.

Park officials of the Roatan Marine Park in Honduras have attempted to train sharks to feed on lionfish to control the invasive populations in the Caribbean. The bobbit worm, an ambush predator, has been filmed preying upon lionfish in Indonesia. Predators of larvae and juvenile lionfish remain unknown, but may prove to be the primary limiting factor of lionfish populations in their native range. In Texas and Florida, where lionfish are regarded as an invasive species, scuba divers and breath-hold divers are encouraged to capture lionfish for sport and food.

Parasites of lionfish have rarely been observed, and are assumed to be infrequent. They include isopods and leeches.

=== Interaction with humans ===
Lionfish are known for their venomous fin rays, which make them hazardous to other marine animals, as well as humans. Pterois venom produced negative inotropic and chronotropic effects when tested in both frog and clam hearts and has a depressive effect on rabbit blood pressure. These results are thought to be due to nitric oxide release. In humans, Pterois venom can cause systemic effects such as pain, nausea, vomiting, fever, headache, numbness, paresthesia, diarrhea, sweating, temporary paralysis of the limbs, respiratory insufficiency, heart failure, and convulsions, and can be fatal. Fatalities are more common in very young children, the elderly, or those who are allergic to the venom. The venom is rarely fatal to healthy adults, but some species have enough venom to produce extreme discomfort for a period of several days. Moreover, Pterois venom poses a danger to allergic victims as they may experience anaphylaxis, a serious and often life-threatening condition that requires immediate emergency medical treatment. Severe allergic reactions to Pterois venom include chest pain, severe breathing difficulties, a drop in blood pressure, swelling of the tongue, sweating, or slurred speech. Such reactions can be fatal if not treated.

Lionfish are edible if prepared correctly.

== Native range and habitat ==
Lionfish are native to the Indian Ocean and western Pacific Ocean. They can be found around the seaward edge of shallow coral reefs, lagoons, rocky substrates, and on mesophotic reefs, and can live in areas of varying salinity, temperature, and depth. They are also frequently found in turbid inshore areas and harbors, and have a generally hostile attitude and are territorial toward other reef fish. They are commonly found from shallow waters down to past 100 m (330 ft) depth, and have in several locations been recorded to 300 m (980 ft) depth. Many universities in the Indo-Pacific have documented reports of Pterois aggression toward divers and researchers. P. volitans and P. miles are native to subtropical and tropical regions from southern Japan and southern Korea to the east coast of Australia, Indonesia, Micronesia, French Polynesia and the South Pacific Ocean. P. miles is also found in the Indian Ocean, from Sumatra to Sri Lanka and the Red Sea.

== Invasive introduction and range ==
=== Western tropical Atlantic ===
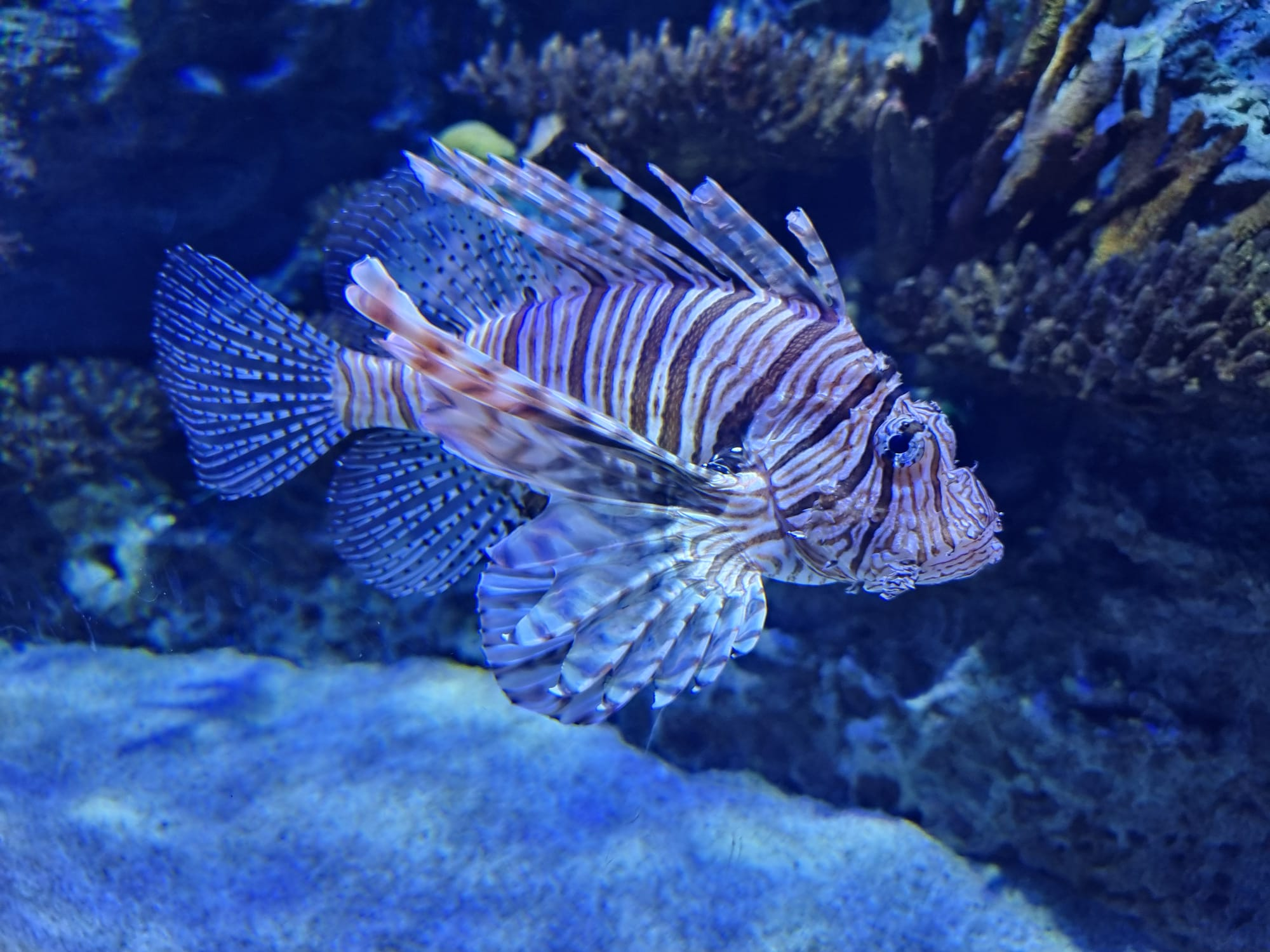
P. volitans displayed at Lisbon Oceanarium

Two of the 5 species of Pterois, the red lionfish (P. volitans) and the common lionfish (P. miles), have established themselves as significant invasive species off the East Coast of the United States and in the Caribbean. About 93% of the invasive population in the Western Atlantic is P. volitans.

The red lionfish is found off the East Coast and Gulf Coast of the United States and in the Caribbean Sea, and was likely first introduced off the Florida coast by the early to mid-1980s. This introduction may have occurred in 1992 when Hurricane Andrew destroyed an aquarium in southern Florida, releasing six lionfish into Biscayne Bay. However, a lionfish was discovered off the coast of Dania Beach, south Florida, as early as 1985, before Hurricane Andrew.

These captured lionfish resemble those of the Philippines, implicating the aquarium trade, and suggesting that the fish may be descendants of individuals discarded by dissatisfied aquarium enthusiasts. Lionfish require experience to maintain in an aquarium, but are often sold to novices who find their care too difficult.

In 2001, the National Oceanic and Atmospheric Administration (NOAA) documented several sightings of lionfish off the coast of Florida, Georgia, South Carolina, North Carolina, Bermuda, and Delaware. In August 2014, when the Gulf Stream was discharging into the mouth of the Delaware Bay, two lionfish were caught by a surf fisherman off the ocean side shore of Cape Henlopen State Park: a red lionfish that weighed 1 pound 4 1/2 ounces (580 g) and a common lionfish that weighed 1 pound 2 ounces (510 g). Three days later, a 1-pound-3-ounce (540 g) red lionfish was caught off the shore of Broadkill Beach which is in the Delaware Bay approximately 15 miles (24 km) north of Cape Henlopen State Park.

The timeline of observations points to the east coast of Florida as the initial source of the western Atlantic invasion, though it has been suggested that the Bahamas may also have been an independent source. Lionfish were first detected in the Bahamas in 2004.

In July 2011, lionfish were reported for the first time in the Flower Garden Banks National Marine Sanctuary off the coast of Texas.

In June 2013 lionfish were discovered as far east as Barbados, and as far south as the Los Roques Archipelago and many Venezuelan continental beaches. Lionfish were first sighted in Brazilian waters in late 2014.

Genetic testing on a single captured individual revealed that it was related to the populations found in the Caribbean, suggesting that the spread of the species occurred by larval dispersal rather than by intentional release. Pelagic larval dispersion is assumed to occur through oceanic currents, including the Gulf Stream and the Caribbean Current. Ballast water discharged from ships can also contribute to the dispersal.

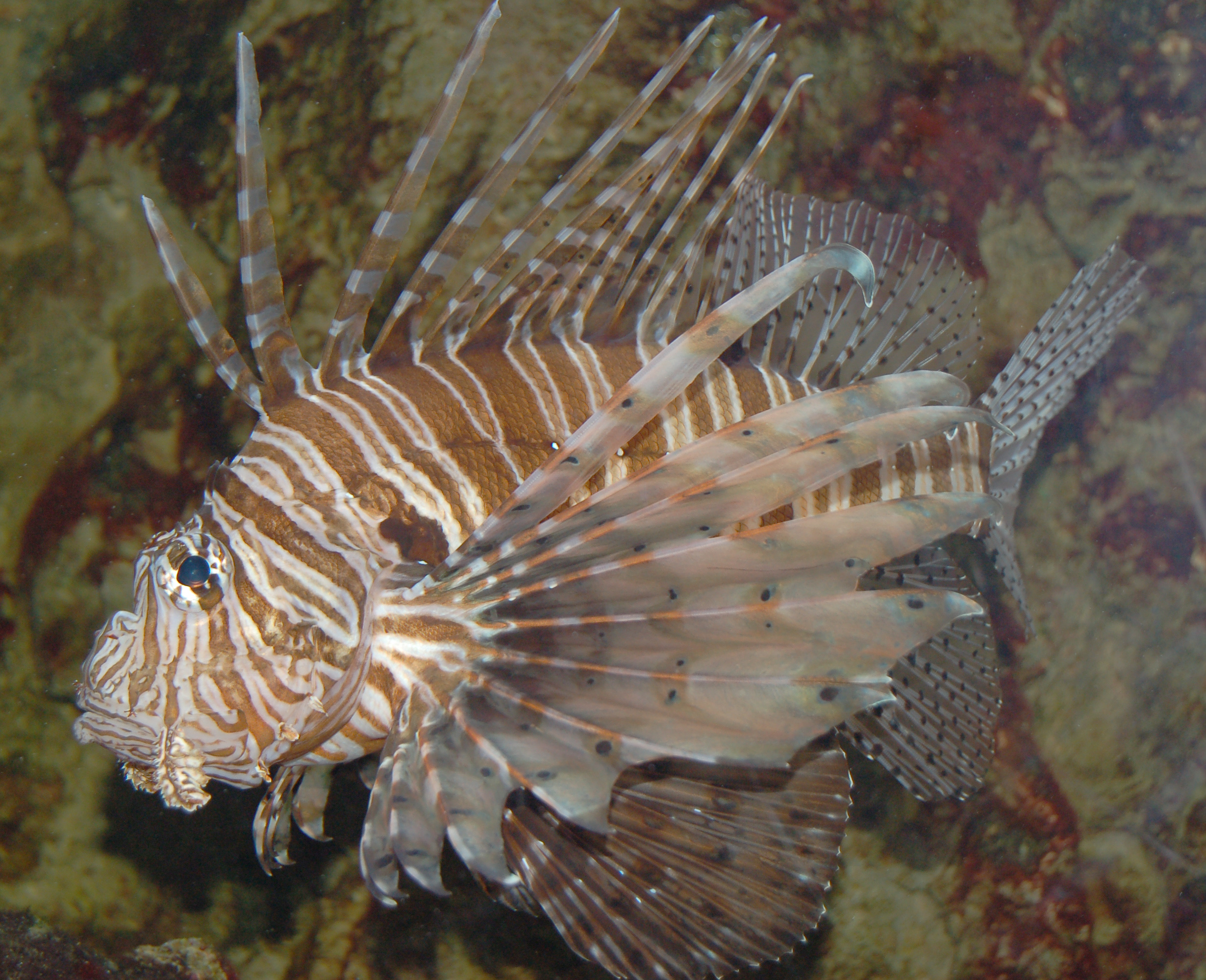
P. volitans is the most abundant species of the invasive lionfish population in the Atlantic and Caribbean.

Adult lionfish are now found along the United States East Coast from Cape Hatteras, North Carolina, to Florida, and along the Gulf Coast to Texas. They are also found off Bermuda, the Bahamas, and throughout the Caribbean, including the Turks and Caicos, Haiti, Cuba, the Dominican Republic, the Cayman Islands, Aruba, Curacao, Trinidad and Tobago, Bonaire, Puerto Rico, St. Croix, Belize, Honduras, Colombia and Mexico. Population densities continue to increase in the invaded areas, resulting in a population boom of up to 700% in some areas between 2004 and 2008.

=== Mediterranean ===
Lionfish have also established themselves in parts of the Mediterranean - with records down to 110 m depth. It was first recorded in 1991 in Israel and quickly jumped to the Turkish Riviera. Lionfish have been found in Maltese waters and waters of other Mediterranean countries, as well as Croatia. Warming sea temperatures may be allowing lionfish to further expand their range in the Mediterranean.

=== Predatorial and invasive behavior ===
Lionfish species are known for devouring many other aquarium fishes, and they are among the few aquarium fish species to successfully establish populations in open marine systems. A single lionfish, located on a reef, reduced the population of juvenile reef fish by 79%.

Lionfish have successfully invaded the coastal waters of the Atlantic in less than a decade, and pose a major threat to reef ecosystems in these areas. A study comparing their abundance from Florida to North Carolina with several species of groupers found they were second only to the native scamp grouper and equally abundant to the graysby, gag, and rock hind. This could be a result of overfishing predators like the grouper, resulting in a surplus of resource availability for the lionfish.

The lionfish invasion is considered to be one of the most serious recent threats to Caribbean and Florida coral reef ecosystems.

Normally, the temperature of the water constrains the distribution of aquatic species. This suggests that temperature tolerance may play a role in the lionfish's enormous recent spread.

The abrupt differences in water temperatures north and south of Cape Hatteras directly correlate with the abundance and distribution of Pterois. Pterois expanded along the southeastern coast of the United States and occupied thermal-appropriate zones within 10 years. This thermally appropriate habitat is expected to expand in the direction of the shore in coming decades, as winter water temperatures warm in response to climate change.

Lionfish can tolerate a minimum salinity of 5 parts per thousand (0.5%) and even withstand pulses of fresh water, which means they can also be found in estuaries of freshwater rivers.

=== Long-term effects of invasion ===
Although the lionfish population has not expanded to a size currently causing major ecological problems, their invasion in the United States coastal waters could lead to serious problems in the future. One likely ecological impact caused by lionfish would be their impact on food web relationships and prey population numbers. This could ultimately lead to reef deterioration and could negatively influence the Atlantic food chain. Lionfish have already been shown to overpopulate reef areas and display aggressive tendencies, forcing native species to move to waters where conditions might be less than favorable.

Lionfish could reduce Atlantic reef diversity by up to 80%.

=== Control and eradication efforts ===
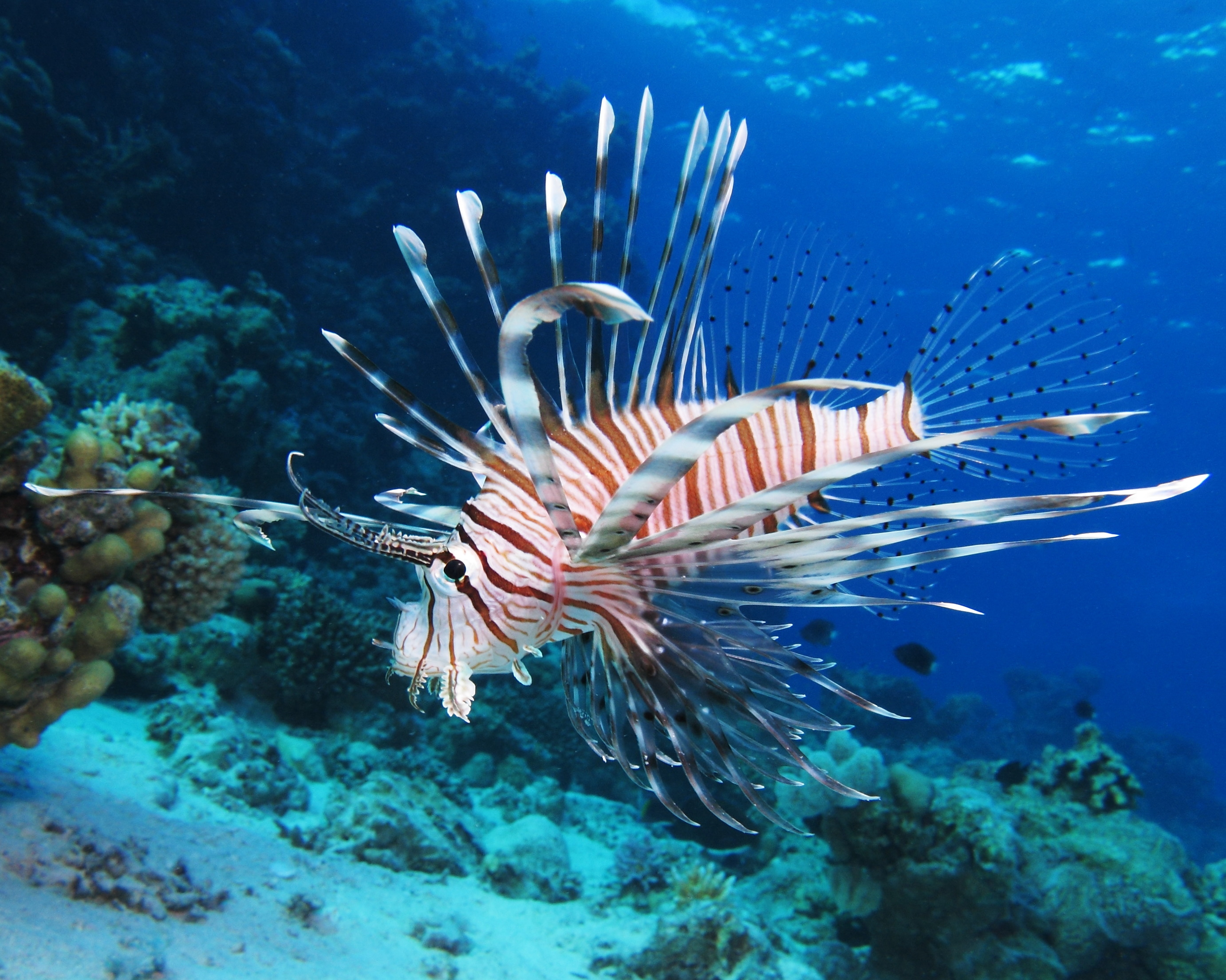
P. miles makes up about 7% of the invasive lionfish population in the Atlantic and Caribbean.

Rigorous and repeated catching and removal of lionfish from invaded waters could potentially control the exponential expansion of the lionfish in invaded waters. But a 2010 study showed effective maintenance would require the monthly harvest of at least 27% of the adult population. Because lionfish are able to reproduce monthly, this effort must be maintained throughout the entire year.

To accomplish even these numbers seems unlikely, but as populations of lionfish continue to grow throughout the Caribbean and Western Atlantic, actions are being taken to attempt to control the quickly growing numbers. In November 2010, for the first time the Florida Keys National Marine Sanctuary began licensing divers to kill lionfish inside the sanctuary in an attempt to eradicate the fish.

Conservation groups and community organizations in the Eastern United States have organized hunting expeditions for lionfish, such as the Environment Education Foundation's 'lionfish derby' held annually in Florida. Divemasters from Cozumel to the Honduran Bay Islands and at Reef Conservation International which operates in the Sapodilla Cayes Marine Reserve off Punta Gorda, Belize, now routinely spear them during dives. But while such culling efforts remove lionfish from shallow reefs, reducing their densities, lionfish have widely been reported on mesophotic coral ecosystems (reefs from 30 to 150 m deep) in the western Atlantic and even in deep-sea habitats (greater than 200 m depth). Recent studies have suggested that the effects of culling are likely to be depth-specific, and so have limited impacts on these deeper reef populations. Therefore, other approaches such as trapping are advocated for removing lionfish from deeper reef habitats.

To help address the effect of lionfish on existing ecosystems, in 2015, the NOAA partnered with the Gulf and Caribbean Fisheries Institute to set up a lionfish portal to provide scientifically accurate information on the invasion and its impacts. The lionfish web portal is aimed at all those involved and affected, including coastal managers, educators, and the public, and the portal was designed as a source of training videos, fact sheets, examples of management plans, and guidelines for monitoring. The web portal draws on the expertise of NOAA's own scientists, as well as that of other scientists and policy makers from academia or NGOs, and managers.

Officials from the Flower Garden Banks National Marine Sanctuary off the coast of Louisiana have said they believe that lionfish are now a permanent fixture of the sanctuary, but hope to monitor and possibly limit their presence.

Red lionfish are an invasive species, yet relatively little is known about them. The NOAA is investigating biotechnological solutions to control the population. This involves understanding how the larvae are dispersed. Another important area of study is what controls the population in its native area. Researchers hope to discover what controls lionfish populations in the Indo-Pacific and apply this information to control the invasive populations, without introducing additional invasive species.

Two new trap designs have been introduced to help with control of lionfish in deep waters. The traps are low and vertical and remain open the entire time of deployment. The verticality of the trap attracts lionfish, which makes catching them easier. These traps have bait that is only appealing to lionfish, they guarantee a catch, and they are easy to transport. As a result, they enable lionfish to be caught without affecting native species that are ecologically, recreationally, and commercially important to the surrounding areas.

Remotely operated vehicles (ROVs) are being developed to help hunt the lionfish. For example, the Reefsweeper ROV uses a harpoon gun to snag its target. This vehicle is able to catch fish that may not otherwise be caught by human hunters.

Hunting and killing lionfish, referred to as "culling", by marine protection agencies and volunteer divers is an important element of control efforts, development of market-based approaches, which create commercial incentives for removals, has been seen as a means to sustain control efforts. The foremost of these market approaches is the promotion of lionfish as a food item. Another is the use of lionfish spines, fins, and tails for jewelry and other decorative items. Lionfish jewelry production initiatives are underway in Belize, the Bahamas, St. Vincent, and the Grenadines.

In 2014 at Jardines de la Reina National Marine Park in Cuba, a diver experimented with spearing and feeding lionfish to sharks in an effort to teach them to seek out the fish as prey. By 2016, Cuba was finding it more effective to fish for lionfish as food.

However, culling has also been known to cause adaptive behavioral changes in lionfish populations. For example, in the Bahamas, lionfish on heavily culled reefs have become more wary of divers and hide more within the reef structure during the day when culling occurs. Similar lionfish responses to divers have been observed when comparing culled sites and sites without culling in Honduras, including altered lionfish behaviour on reefs too deep for regular culling, but adjacent to heavily culled sites potentially implying movement of individuals between depths.

==== "Lionfish as Food" campaign ====
In 2010, NOAA (which also encourages people to report lionfish sightings, to help track lionfish population dispersal) began a campaign to encourage the consumption of the fish. The "Lionfish as Food" campaign encourages human hunting of the fish as the only form of control known to date. Increasing the catch of lionfish could not only help maintain a reasonable population density, but also provide an alternative fishing source to overfished populations, such as grouper and snapper. The taste is described as "buttery and tender". To promote the campaign, the Roman Catholic Church in Colombia agreed to have their clergy's sermons suggest to their parishioners (84% of the population) eating lionfish on Fridays, Lent, and Easter, which proved highly successful in decreasing the invasive fish problem.

When properly filleted, the naturally venomous fish is safe to eat. Some concern exists about the risk of ciguatera fish poisoning (CFP) from the consumption of lionfish, and the FDA included lionfish on the list of species at risk for CFP when lionfish are harvested in some areas tested positive for ciguatera. No cases of CFP from the consumption of lionfish have been verified, and published research has found that the toxins in lionfish venom may be causing false positives in tests for the presence of ciguatera. The Reef Environmental Education Foundation provides advice to restaurant chefs on how they can incorporate the fish into their menus. The NOAA calls the lionfish a "delicious, delicately flavored fish" similar in texture to grouper.

Another initiative is centered around the production of leather from lionfish hides. It seeks to establish a production chain and market for high-quality leather produced from the hides. The goal is to control invasive lionfish populations while providing economic benefits to local fishing communities.

== See also ==
- Dendrochirus, the dwarf lionfishes
- List of venomous animals
- List of invasive species in Florida
