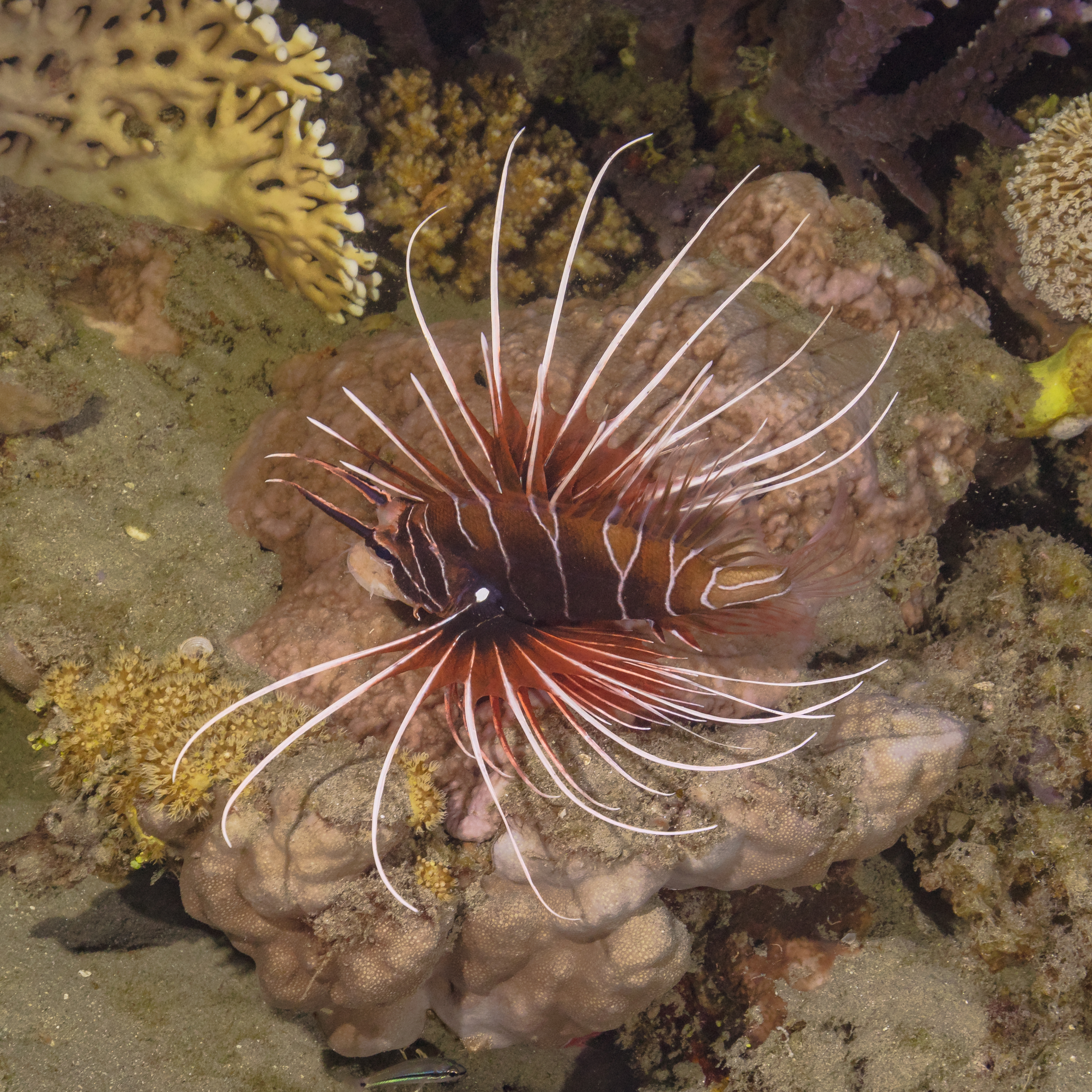

Scientific classification
- Kingdom: Animalia
- Phylum: Chordata
- Class: Actinopterygii
- Order: Perciformes
- Family: Scorpaenidae
- Genus: Pteropterus
- Species: P. cinctus

Binomial name
- Pteropterus cinctus Rüppell, 1838

= Pterois cincta =

Species of ray-finned fish

Pteropterus cinctus, the Red Sea lionfish or Red Sea clearfin lionfish, is a species of marine ray-finned fish belonging to the family Scorpaenidae, the scorpionfishes and lionfishes. It is found in the Red Sea.

== Taxonomy ==
Pterois cincta was first formally described in 1838 by the German naturalist and explorer Eduard Rüppell with the type locality given as Jeddah in Saudi Arabia. This taxon was regarded by some authorities to be a junior synonym of P. radiatus but is now considered to be a valid species. In 2023, it was reclassified as a species of the revalidated genus Pteropterus.

=== Etymology ===
The specific name cinctus means "belted", an allusion to the thin milky white horizontal striping of this species.

== Distribution and habitat ==
Pterois cincta appears to be endemic to the Red Sea, it is found as far south of the straits at Bab-el-Mandeb north to the Gulf of Aqaba. This species is found over sandy bottoms in or near coral reefs at depths of 5 to 15 m (16 to 49 ft).

== Description ==
Pterois cincta has 12 spines and between 10 and 12 soft rays, typically 11, in its dorsal fin and 3 spines and 6 or 7 soft rays in its anal fin. There are typically 16 fin rays in the pectoral fin pectoral-fin, although there are infrequently 15, 17 or 18. The soft rays of the dorsal fin are relatively long averaging around 35% of the fish's standard length and the soft rays of the anal fin are even longer, averaging around 40% of the fish's standard length. The pectoral fin rays too, are relatively long, the ninth ray being nearly as long or exceeding the standard length, as are the pelvic fin rays which average 70% of the standard length, The supraocular tentacles lack lateral branches. This species attains a maximum total length of 15.9 cm (6.3 in) The background colour of the head and body is brownish-red with whitish lips. A relatively wide reddish brown band with thin white edges runs from the tentacle above the eye, diagonally through the eye to the rear edge of the preoperculum with 2 more white-edged rusty coloured bands saddling the nape. There are 5 more similar bands on the flanks with the white forking at the dorsal and ventral ends, the second and third bands are the widest and have a widthe greater than the diameter of the orbit. There is a horizontal white-edged rusty band on the caudal peduncle. The fins have a similar reddish brown colour to the body, although the soft rayed dorsal and anal fins have this on the rays only with the membranes being translucent and there are whitish markings on both the pectoral and pelvic fins.

It is most closely related to the more broadly distributed P. radiatus, which it is very similar to in appearance, differing mainly in having longer fin rays and on average slightly different markings. The two species are otherwise easily distinguishable from other species of lionfish.

== Gallery ==
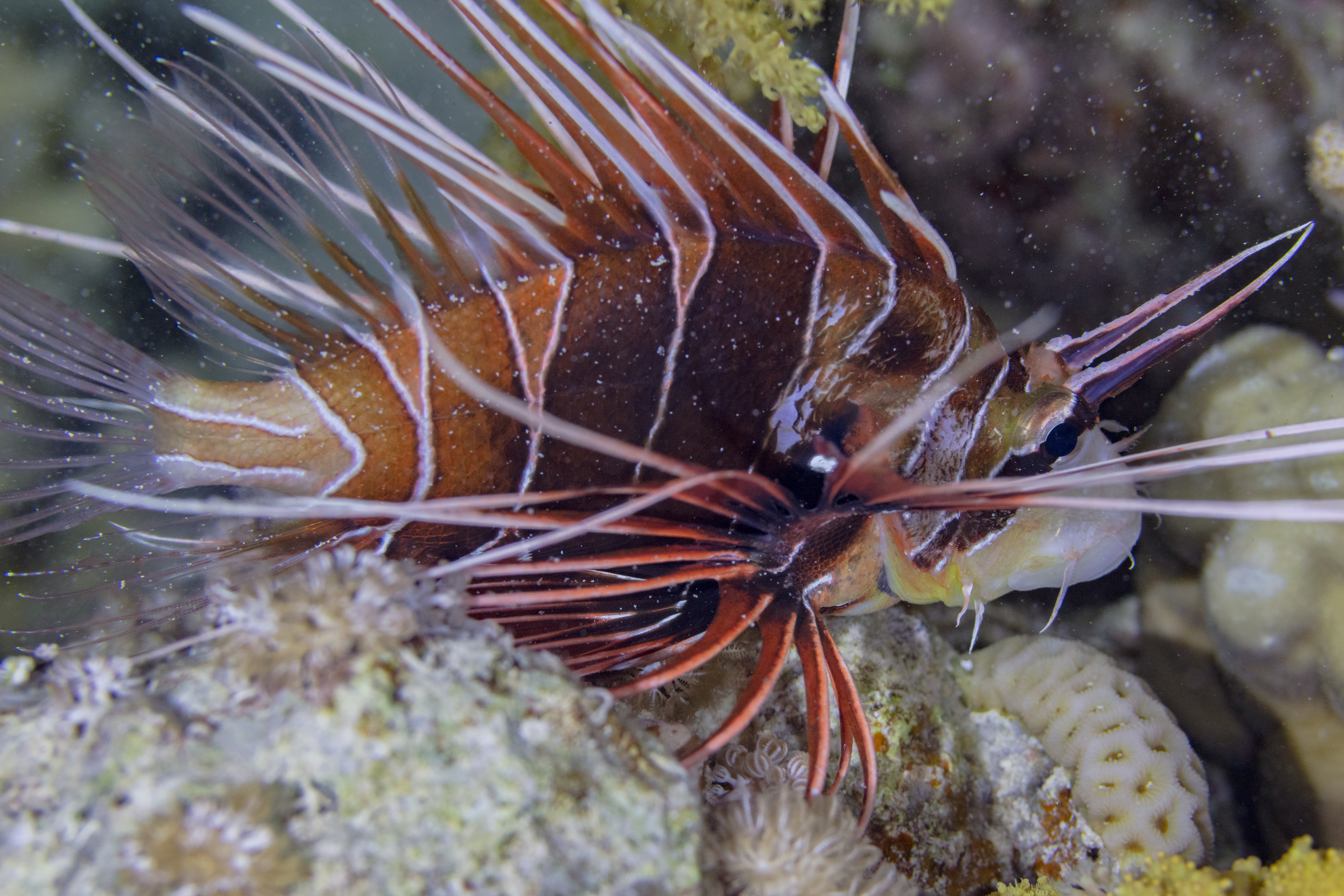

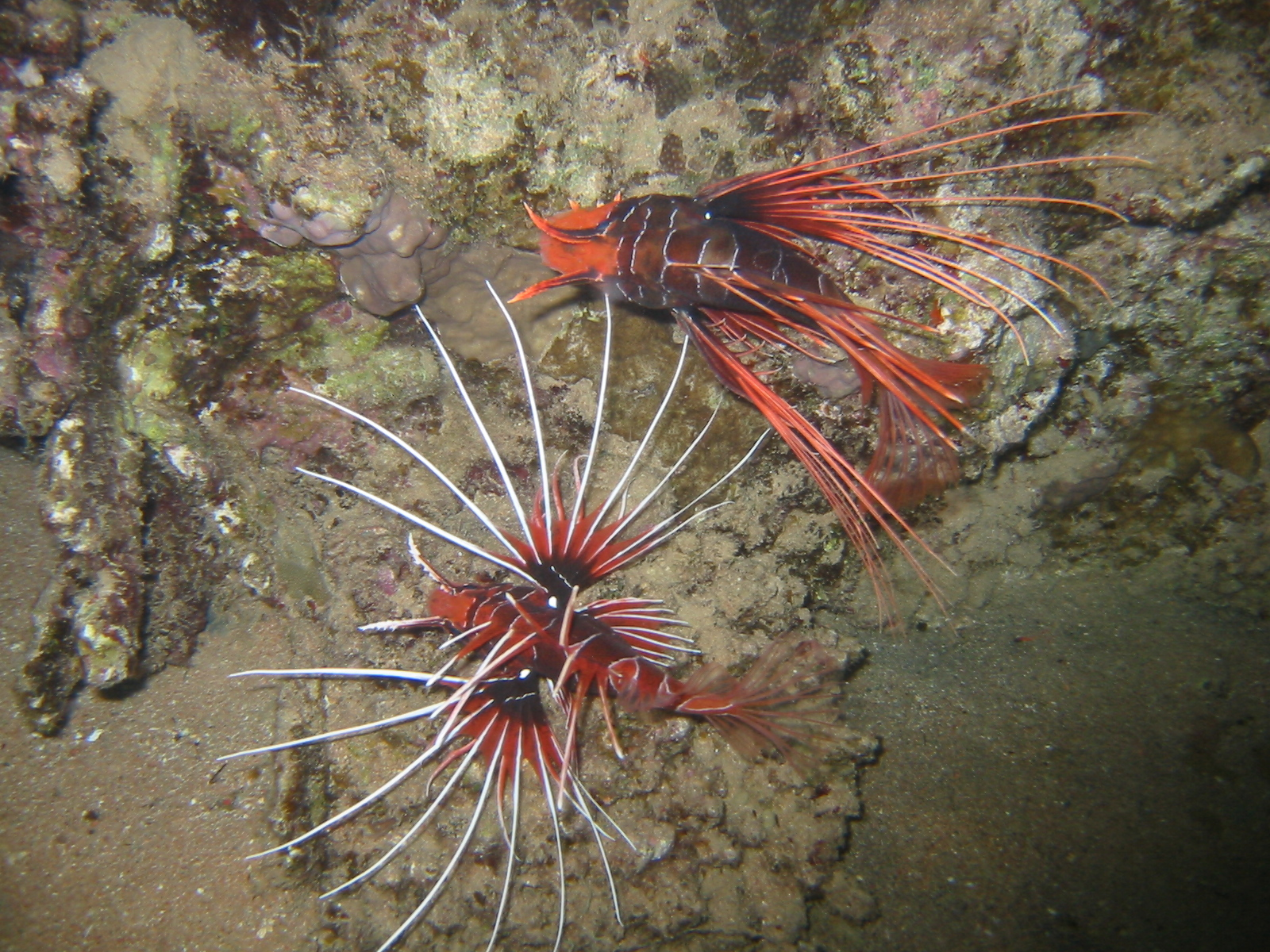

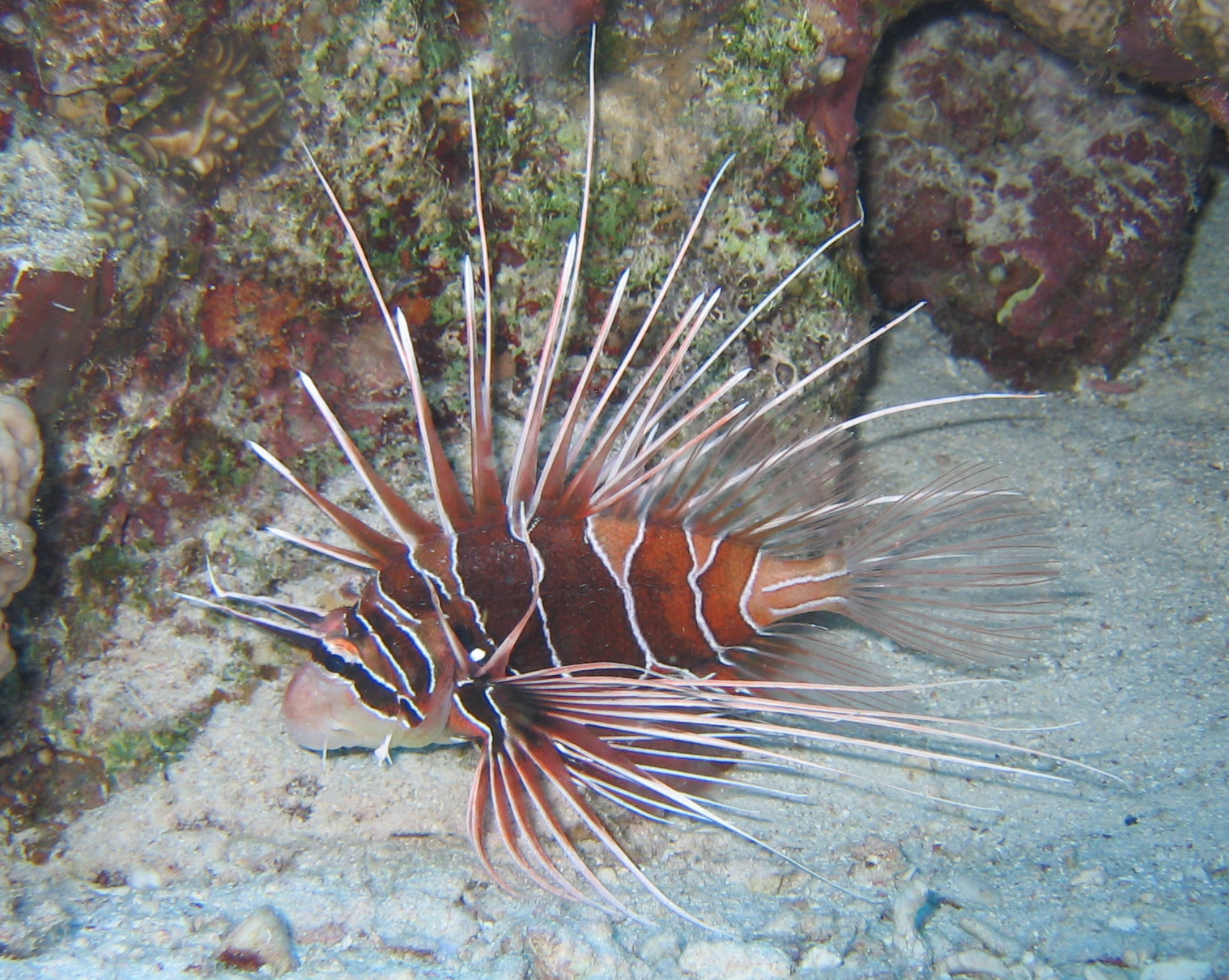
