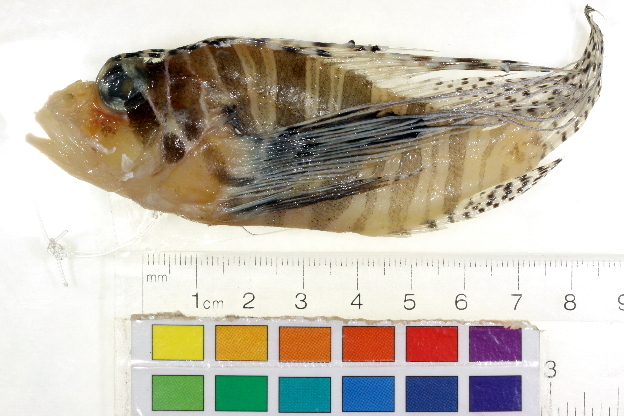

Scientific classification
- Kingdom: Animalia
- Phylum: Chordata
- Class: Actinopterygii
- Order: Perciformes
- Family: Scorpaenidae
- Genus: Pterois
- Species: P. andover

Binomial name
- Pterois andover G. R. Allen & Erdmann, 2008

= Andover lionfish =

Species of fish

The Andover lionfish (Pterois andover) is a species of marine ray-finned fish belonging to the family Scorpaenidae, the scorpionfishes and lionfishes. It is found in the western Pacific Ocean.

== Taxonomy and etymology ==
The Andover lionfish was first formally described in 2008 by the American ichthyologists Gerald R. Allen and Mark van Nydeck Erdmann with the type locality given as southwestern Yapen Island in Cenderawasih Bay in the Papua Province of Indonesia. The specific name refers to the Singaporean company Andover Leisure Pte Ltd, part of the Andover group of companies, which owns, builds and manages oceanaria and is "dedicated to promoting greater public appreciation of the oceans and marine conservation in Asia". This name was requested by Sinduchajana Sulistyo, chairman of the Andover group, who made a successful bid to conserve the Andover lionfish at, a black-tie charity auction, the Blue Auction, held in Monaco on 20 September 2007 to support Conservation International's Bird's Head Seascape marine conservation initiative.

== Description ==
The Andover lion fish has 13 spines and 11 soft rays in its dorsal fin, the first dorsal spine being short, being around 15% of the fish's standard length, while its anal fin contains 3 spines and 7 soft rays. The pectoral fin has between 12 and 14 fin rays, typically 13. The dorsal spines have a thin, barely noticeable membrane on their rear edges which expands into a pennant-like flap at the tip> There are few dark spots on the median fins compared to related species with 5 to 28 on the dorsal fin, 10 to 19 on the anal fin and 17 to 41 on the caudal fin.

== Distribution and habitat ==
Andover lionfish are found in the western Pacific in marine waters off of Indonesia and Papua New Guinea and ranges as far as Sabah, Malaysia, and the Philippines. P. andover is found at depths from 3–70 m. This species is found on or in the vicinity of turbid inshore reefs within more extensive areas of sandy-silty substrates, frequently close to river mouths.

== Biology ==
Andover lionfish are usually observed as solitary fish, although small family groups have been recorded. During the day they hide in crevices and under rocks, with their tails pointing outwards, among coral reefs or outcrops. They feed at night over soft mud and sand substrates, on crustaceans and small fish. Like all lionfishes this species is protected by venomous spines.
