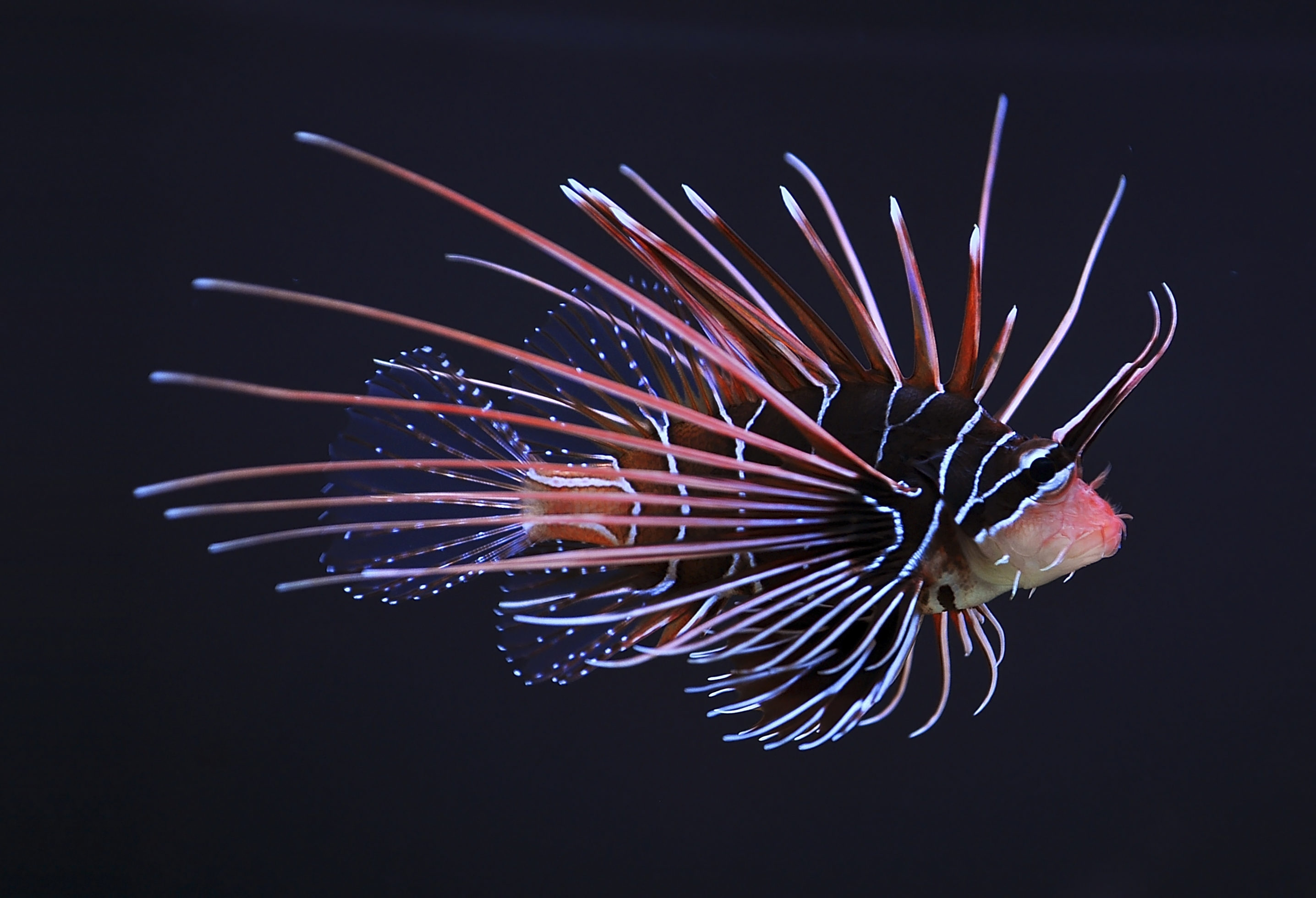

Conservation status
- Least Concern (IUCN 3.1)

Scientific classification
- Kingdom: Animalia
- Phylum: Chordata
- Class: Actinopterygii
- Order: Perciformes
- Family: Scorpaenidae
- Genus: Pteropterus
- Species: P. radiatus

Binomial name
- Pteropterus radiatus G. Cuvier, 1829

Synonyms
- Pteropterus radiata (Cuvier, 1829); Pterois vittata Sauvage, 1878; Scorpaena barffi Curtiss, 1944

= Clearfin lionfish =

Species of fish

The clearfin lionfish (Pteropterus radiatus), also called the tailbar lionfish, radiata lionfish, fireworks fish or radial firefish, is a carnivorous, ray-finned fish with venomous spines belonging to the family Scorpaenidae, the scorpionfishes and lionfishes. This species lives in the Indian and western Pacific Oceans.

== Taxonomy ==
The clearfin lionfish was first formally described in 1829 by the French zoologist Georges Cuvier with the type locality given as Tahiti. In 2023, it was reclassified as a species of the revalidated genus Pteropterus.

=== Etymology ===
The specific name radiatus means "radiated" or "rayed", thought to be an allusion to the long pectoral-fin rays, which are free of fin membrane distally.

== Distribution and habitat ==
Clearfin lionfish are native to the western Indo-Pacific region. Its range extends from South Africa and the Gulf of Aden to Indonesia, the Society Islands, the Ryukyu Islands, northern Australia, and New Caledonia. It is found on both inshore and offshore rocky reefs at depths to about 25 m (82 ft). Juvenile fish are sometimes found in tide pools.

== Description ==
The clearfin lionfish grows to a length of about 24 cm (9 in), though a more usual size is 20 cm (8 in). The dorsal fin has 12 or 13 long, venomous spines and 10 to 12 soft rays. The anal fin has three spines and five or six soft rays. The large pectoral fins flare out to the side and are clear and unbanded. The other fins are also colourless. The head and body colour is reddish-brown with about six vertical dark bands of different colour on the body separated by thin white lines. Two white horizontal lines occur on the caudal peduncle which distinguishes this fish from other similar lionfishes.

It is most closely related to the Red Sea endemic P. cinctus, which it is very similar to in appearance, differing mainly in having shorter fin rays and on average slightly different markings. The two species are otherwise easily distinguishable from other species of lionfish.

== Biology ==
The clearfin lionfish is mainly nocturnal. It spends the day hiding in rock crevices, in small caves, or under overhangs. It emerges at night to feed on invertebrates such as crabs and shrimps.
