= Eugène Anselme Sébastien Léon Desmarest =

French zoologist and entomologist

Eugène Anselme Sébastien Léon Desmarest (1816–1889) was a French zoologist and entomologist. He was the son of Anselme Gaëtan Desmarest (1784–1838).

== Works ==
Partial list:

- Sixième ordre. Hyménoptères. In: Chenu, J.C., Encyclopédie d'histoire naturelle ou traité complet de cette science d'après les travaux des naturalistes les plus éminents de touts les pays et de toutes des époques. Marescq et Compagnie, Paris. v.18, p. 123-181 (1860).
- Reptiles et poissons. In: J. G. Chenu.Encyclopédie d'histoire naturelle; ou, Traité complet de cette science d'après les travaux des naturalistes les plus éeminents de toutes les époques, etc.... par le Dr. Chenu. Encyclopédie d'histoire naturelle v. 19, p. 1-360 + 1-62 (1874)
