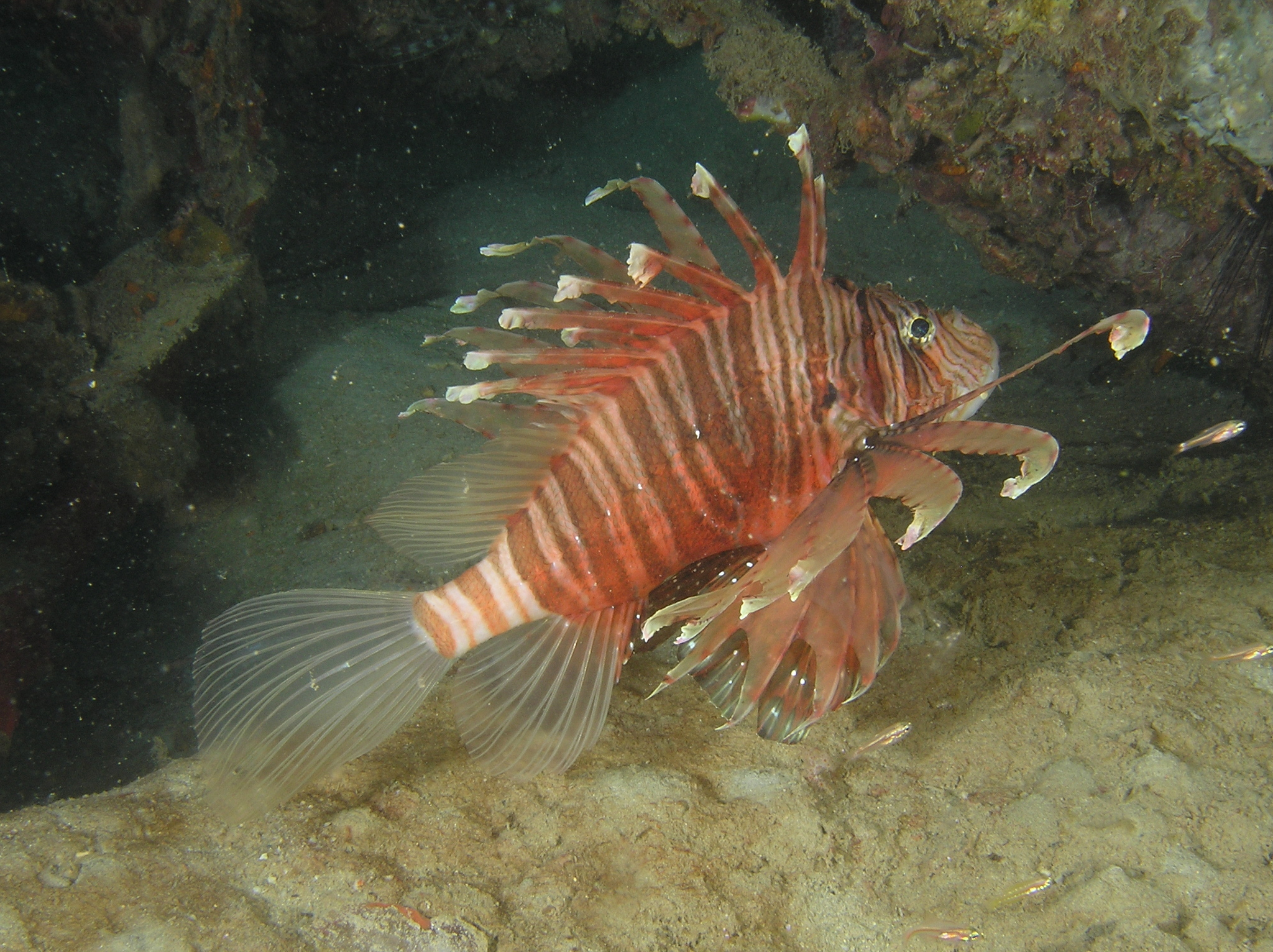
- In Malaysia

Conservation status
- Least Concern (IUCN 3.1)

Scientific classification
- Kingdom: Animalia
- Phylum: Chordata
- Class: Actinopterygii
- Order: Perciformes
- Family: Scorpaenidae
- Genus: Pterois
- Species: P. russelii

Binomial name
- Pterois russelii E. T. Bennett, 1831

Synonyms
- Pterois geniserra Cuvier, 1829; Pterois kodipungi Bleeker, 1852; Pseudomonopterus kodipungi (Bleeker, 1852)

= Pterois russelii =

Species of fish

Pterois russelii, the largetail turkeyfish, plaintail firefish, plaintail turkeyfish, Russell's firefish, Russell's lionfish, spotless butterfly-cod or the spotless firefish, is a species of ray-finned fish with venomous spines belonging to the family Scorpaenidae, the scorpionfishes and lionfishes. It is native to the Indo-Pacific Ocean from the eastern part of Africa to the Persian Gulf.

== Taxonomy ==
Pterois russelii was first formally described in 1831 by the English naturalist Edward Turner Bennett with the type locality given as Coromandel Coast in India. Molecular studies, and some morphological data too, have indicated that this species and the luna lionfish (P. lunulata) are the same species, P. russelii.

=== Etymology ===
The specific name honours the Scottish surgeon and herpetologist Patrick Russell, who had illustrated and described, without naming, this species in 1803. Bennett, misspelt Russell's name by leaving out the final l, as Cuvier and Valenciennes did on a consistent basis.

== Distribution and habitat ==
Pterois russelii has a wide Indo-Pacific distribution from the coast of eastern Africa as far south as South Africa. It then occurs from Oman east to Japan and Australia. It has been recorded in the Red Sea but this was only confirmed in 2016.

In Australian waters Russell's lionfish is found from the Exmouth Gulf in Western Australia around the northern tropical coasts to the Great Barrier Reef in Queensland.

It occurs at depths of 15 to 60 m (49 to 197 ft), where it is found in areas of muddy substrate in shletered shallow estuaries, bays and coastal waters down to deeper waters in quiet offshore reefs.

== Description ==
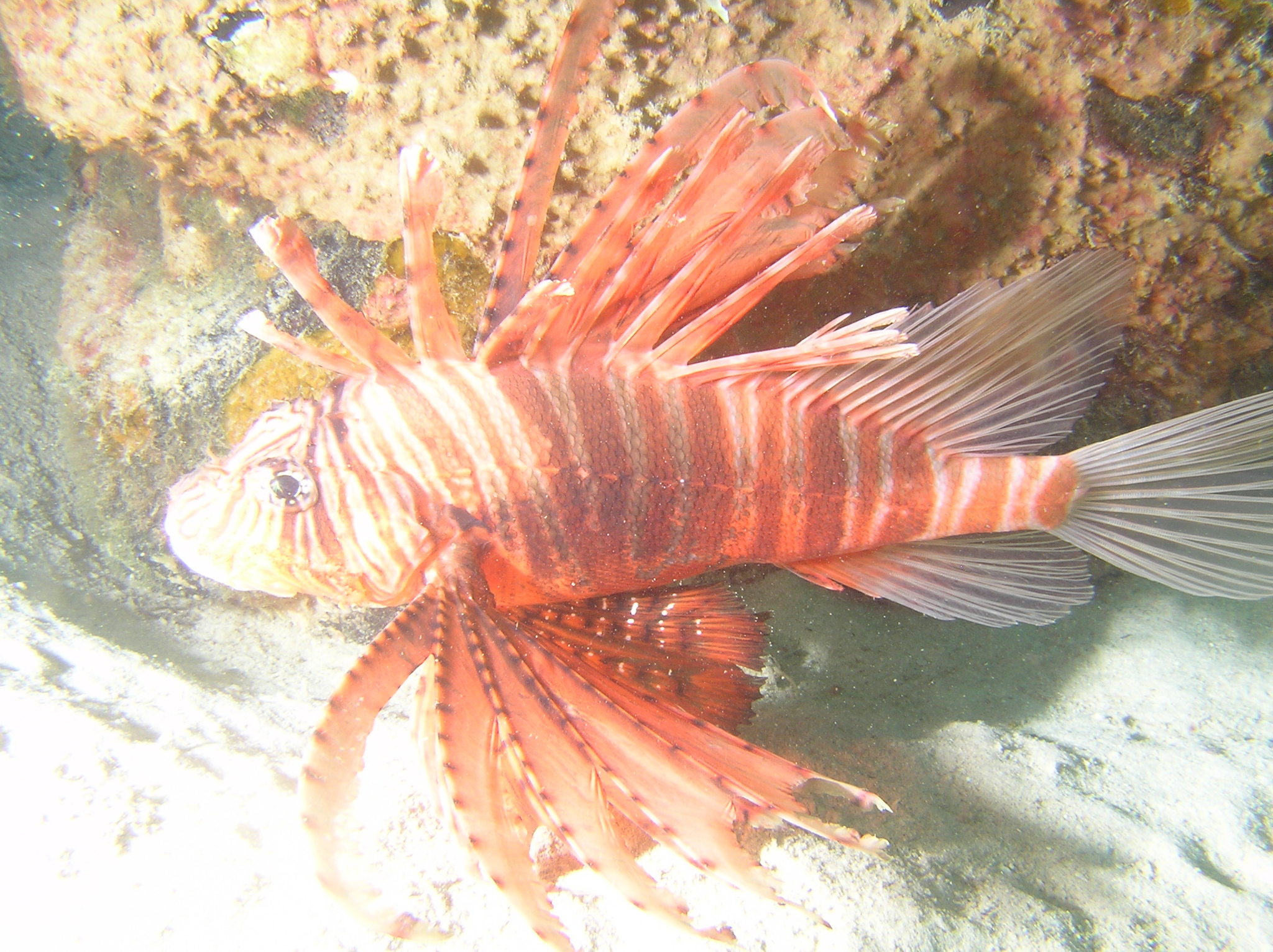
In Malaysia

Pterois russelii has 13 spines and between 10 and 12 soft rays in its dorsal fin and 3 spines and 7 or 8 soft rays in its anal fin.

It has a whitish body striped vertically with reddish brown. This species has no rows of small dark spots on the soft dorsal, anal and caudal fins which are a feature of related species, and it has comparatively short dorsal-fin spines.

The maximum published standard length of Russell's lionfish is 30 cm (12 in).

== Biology ==
Pterois russelii is a solitary species which has venom bearing spines. It feeds on smaller fishes, crabs and shrimp.

== Utilisation ==
Pterois russelii is infrequently found in the aquarium trade.
