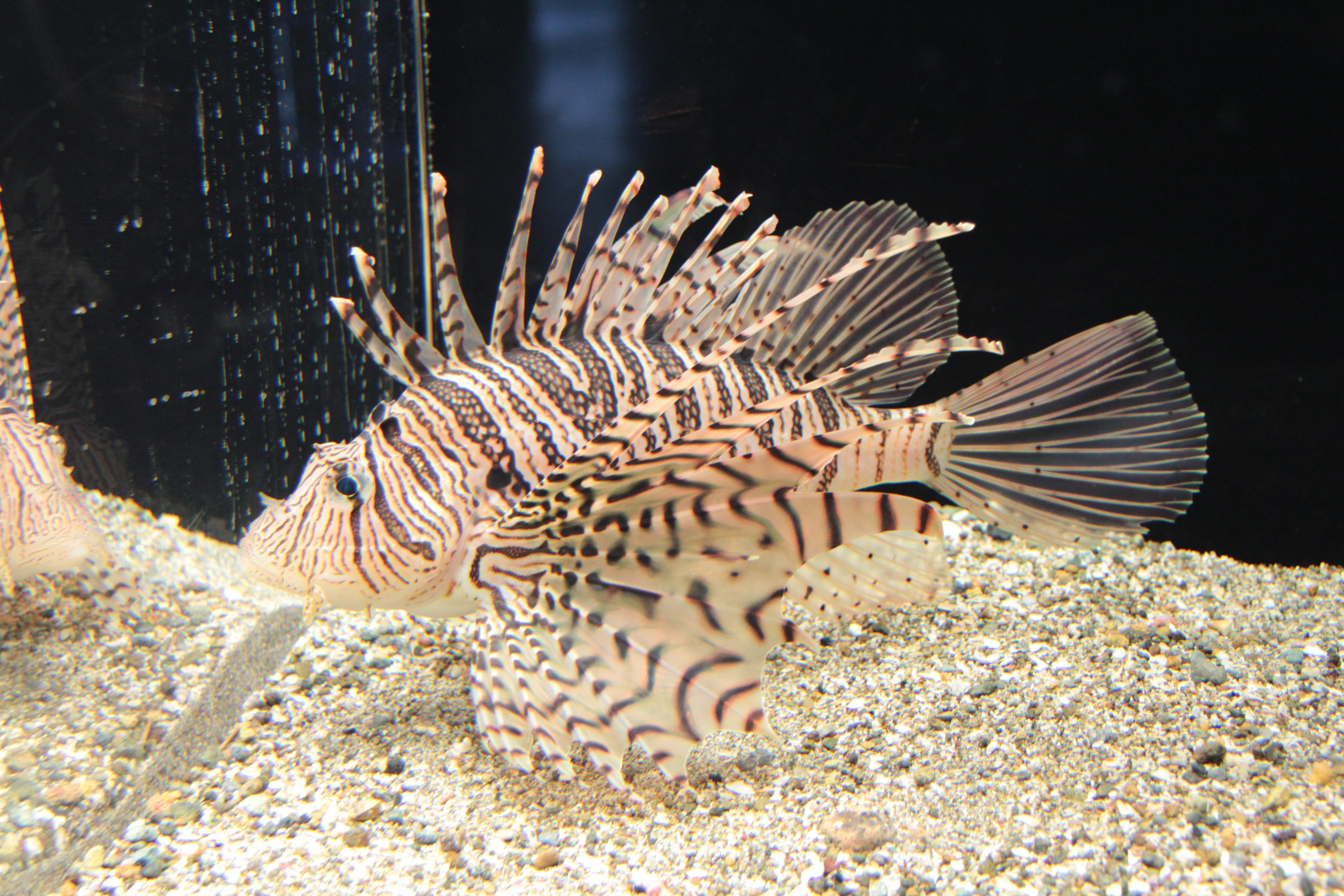

Conservation status
- Least Concern (IUCN 3.1)

Scientific classification
- Kingdom: Animalia
- Phylum: Chordata
- Class: Actinopterygii
- Order: Perciformes
- Family: Scorpaenidae
- Genus: Pterois
- Species: P. lunulata

Binomial name
- Pterois lunulata Temminck & Schlegel, 1843

= Luna lionfish =

Species of fish

The luna lionfish (Pterois lunulata), the dragon's beard fish or Japanese lionfish, is a species of marine ray-finned fish belonging to the family Scorpaenidae, which consists of scorpionfishes and lionfishes. It is found in the western Pacific Ocean.

== Taxonomy ==
The luna lionfish was first formally described in 1843 by the naturalists Coenraad Jacob Temminck and Hermann Schlegel with the type locality given as Nagasaki Bay in Japan. Molecular studies, and some morphological data too, have indicated that this species and P. russelii are the same species, P. russelii. The specific name lunulata means "moon shaped", thought to be a reference to the crescent shaped black spots on the pectoral fins.

== Description ==
The luna lionfish is very similar to P, russelli and there are almost no known consistent morphological and genetic features which separate these two taxa. They are separated by some differences in the number of body scales above the lateral line with there being 7–10 in this species and 9–12 in P. russelli and in the number of scale rows running along the body from behind the gills to the base of the tail where this species has 60–80 and P. russelli has 70–95. The luna lionfish also has white spots on the inner pectoral fin and some differences in the average length of that fin. It may be that P. lunulata is a morph of P. russelli. There are scales with pale centres which create a lattice-like pattern on the bands on the body, the pectoral-fin rays have V-shapoed markings and the soft-rayed parts of the dorsal, anal and caudal fins are spotted in large adults. The luna lionfish attains a maximum published total length of 35 cm (14 in), although 25 cm (9.8 in) is more typical.

== Distribution and habitat ==
The luna lionfish is found in the Western Pacific Ocean from southern Japan and Korea in the north south to Australia and New Caledonia. They occur over rocky substrates in subtropical waters and are typically found in open area where there are isolated outcrops of reef or over soft-bottom substrates at moderate depths of 132 to 172 m (433 to 564 ft).

== Biology ==
The luna lionfish is, like other lionfishes, predatory and feeds on small fishes and crustaceans. The spines in the fins are venom bearing.
