= Lionfish (disambiguation) =

The Lionfish (Pterois) is a genus of venomous predatory fish.

It may also refer to:

- Red lionfish (P. volitans), a significant invasive species off the East Coast of North America and in the Caribbean

== Fish ==
- a number of fish species within family Scorpaenidae, mostly found in the Indo-Pacific:
  - Brachypterois serrulata, also known as the Pygmy Lionfish
  - within genus Dendrochirus, collectively known as the dwarf lionfishes
    - Dendrochirus barberi, known as the Hawaiian Lionfish or Green Lionfish
    - Dendrochirus biocellatus, known as the Fu Chu Lionfish or Twinspot Lionfish
    - Dendrochirus brachypterus, known as the Hawaiian Lionfish
    - Dendrochirus zebra, known as the Zebra Lionfish
  - within genus Ebosia:
    - Ebosia bleekeri, also known as Bleeker's Lionfish
  - within genus Parapterois:
    - Parapterois heterura, also known as the Blackfoot Lionfish
  - within genus Pterois, collectively known as the lionfish:
    - Pterois antennata, also known as the Antennata Lionfish
    - Pterois miles, also known as the African Lionfish or Mombasa Lionfish
    - Pterois radiata, also known as the Clearfin Lionfish, Tailbar Lionfish, or Radiata Lionfish
    - Pterois volitans, also known as the Red Lionfish

== Other ==
- USS Lionfish (SS-298), a United States Navy submarine
