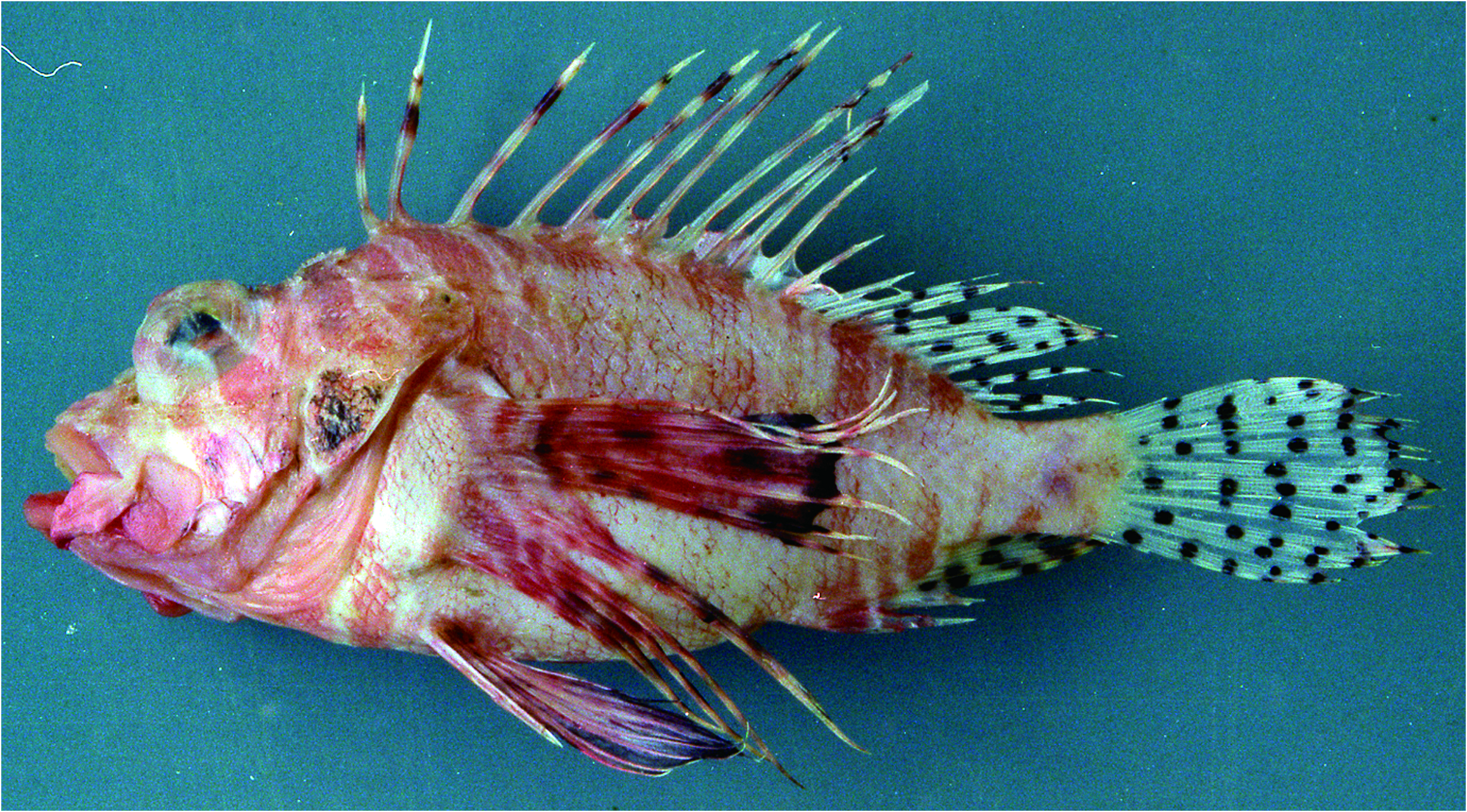

Scientific classification
- Kingdom: Animalia
- Phylum: Chordata
- Class: Actinopterygii
- Division: Teleostei
- Order: Perciformes
- Family: Scorpaenidae
- Genus: Pteropterus
- Species: P. brevipectoralis

Binomial name
- Pteropterus brevipectoralis (Mandritsa, 2002)

Synonyms
- Pteropterus brevipectoralis Mandritsa, 2002

= Pterois brevipectoralis =

Species of fish

Pteropterus brevipectoralis is a species of marine ray-finned fish belonging to the family Scorpaenidae, the scorpionfishes and lionfishes. This species is found in the Western Indian Ocean at a depth of 70 to 80 m (230 to 260 ft).

== Taxonomy ==
Pterois brevipectoralis was first formally described as Pteropterus brevipectoralis in 2002 by the Russian zoologist Sergey Anatolyevich Mandritsa with the type locality given as the Saya de Malha Bank in the Indian Ocean. In 2023, it was reclassified as a species of the revalidated genus Pteropterus.

=== Etymology ===
The specific name brevipectoralis means "short pectoral", alluding to the shorter pectoral fins than those of the similar P. sphex.

== Description ==
Pterois brevipectoralis has 13 spines and 10 soft rays in its dorsal fin with 3 spines and 6 soft rays in the anal fin. There are 16, occasionally 15, fin rays in the pectoral fin, these rays are short and do not extend beyond the rear of the base of the dorsal fin. The longest dorsal fin spine is longer than the moderately compressed, oblong-shaped body's depth. The background colour of the head and body is white, darkening to a pinkish shade on the back. The jaws are pinkish as is the flap of skin on the tip of the lacrimal spine. A reddish band runs through the eye to the upper rear angle of the preoperculum. There is a reddish saddle-like mark on the nape and many slender reddish bands on the body. The membranes of the median fins are translucent with each dorsal fin spine having 2 or 3 reddish bands. The soft rayed part of the dorsal fin, the anal fin and the caudal fin are marked with black dots. The pectoral fin is dark red, with some quite large black blotches on the membrane and a thin blackish band along its margin.

== Distribution and habitat ==
Pterois brevipectoralis is a little known species that has been found in the Mascarene Islands and the Saya de Malha Bank in the Western Indian Ocean where they have been recorded at depths between 70 and 80 m (230 and 260 ft).
