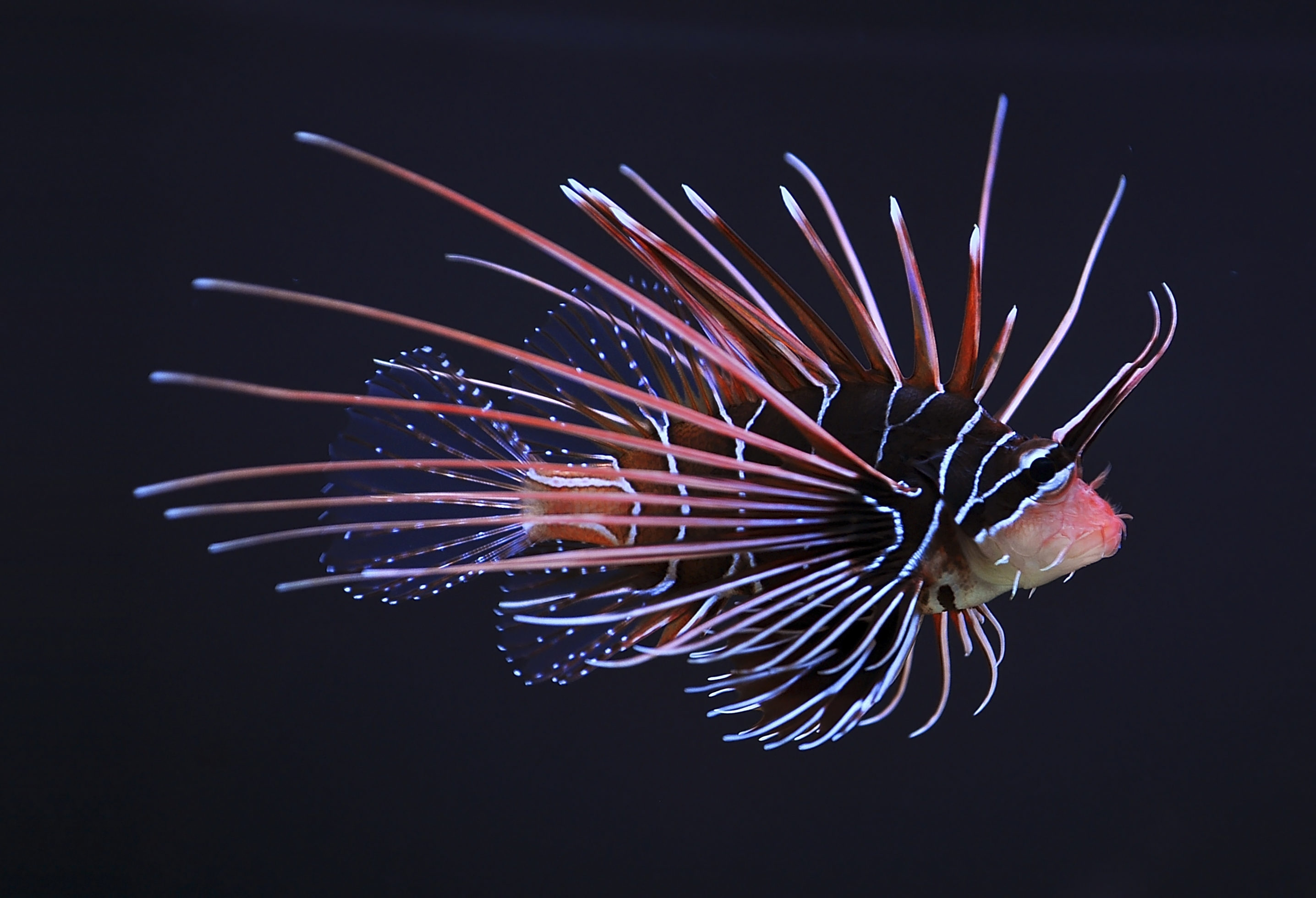
- Pteropterus radiatus

Scientific classification
- Kingdom: Animalia
- Phylum: Chordata
- Class: Actinopterygii
- Order: Perciformes
- Family: Scorpaenidae
- Subfamily: Pteroinae
- Genus: Pteropterus; Swainson, 1839

Type species
- Pterois radiata G. Cuvier, 1829

= Pteropterus =

Genus of fish

Pteropterus is a genus of marine ray-finned fishes belonging to the family Scorpaenidae, the scorpionfishes. It is one of several genera in the subfamily Pteroinae which are colloquially referred to as "lionfish".

== Taxonomy ==
The genus Pteropterus was described by William Swainson in 1839. In 1882, Joseph Swain synonymized Pteropterus with Pterois. Since then, Pteropterus has been inconsistently treated as either its own genus or a synonym of Pterois, until 2023, when it was validated after it was discovered that Pterois was not monophyletic.

Pteropterus is most closely related to the genus Dendrochirus.

== Species ==
Species include:

Image	Scientific name	Common name	Distribution
	P. antennatus (Bloch, 1787)	Spot-fin lionfish	Tropical Indian and Western Pacific Oceans
	P. brevipectoralis (Mandritsa, 2002)		Western Indian Ocean
	P. cinctus (Rüppell, 1838)	Red Sea lionfish	Jeddah, Saudi Arabia, Red Sea
	P. mombasae (J. L. B. Smith, 1957)	African lionfish, frill-fin turkeyfish	tropical Indian Ocean and the Western Pacific
	P. paucispinula (Matsunuma & Motomura, 2014)		India to northern Australia (Timor Sea); north to southern Japan; eastward to Wallis and Futuna Islands
	P. radiatus (G. Cuvier, 1829)	Clear-fin lionfish	Red Sea to Sodwana Bay, South Africa and to the Society Islands, north to the Ryukyu Islands, south to New Caledonia
	P. sphex (D. S. Jordan & Evermann, 1903)	Hawaiian turkeyfish	Hawaii
