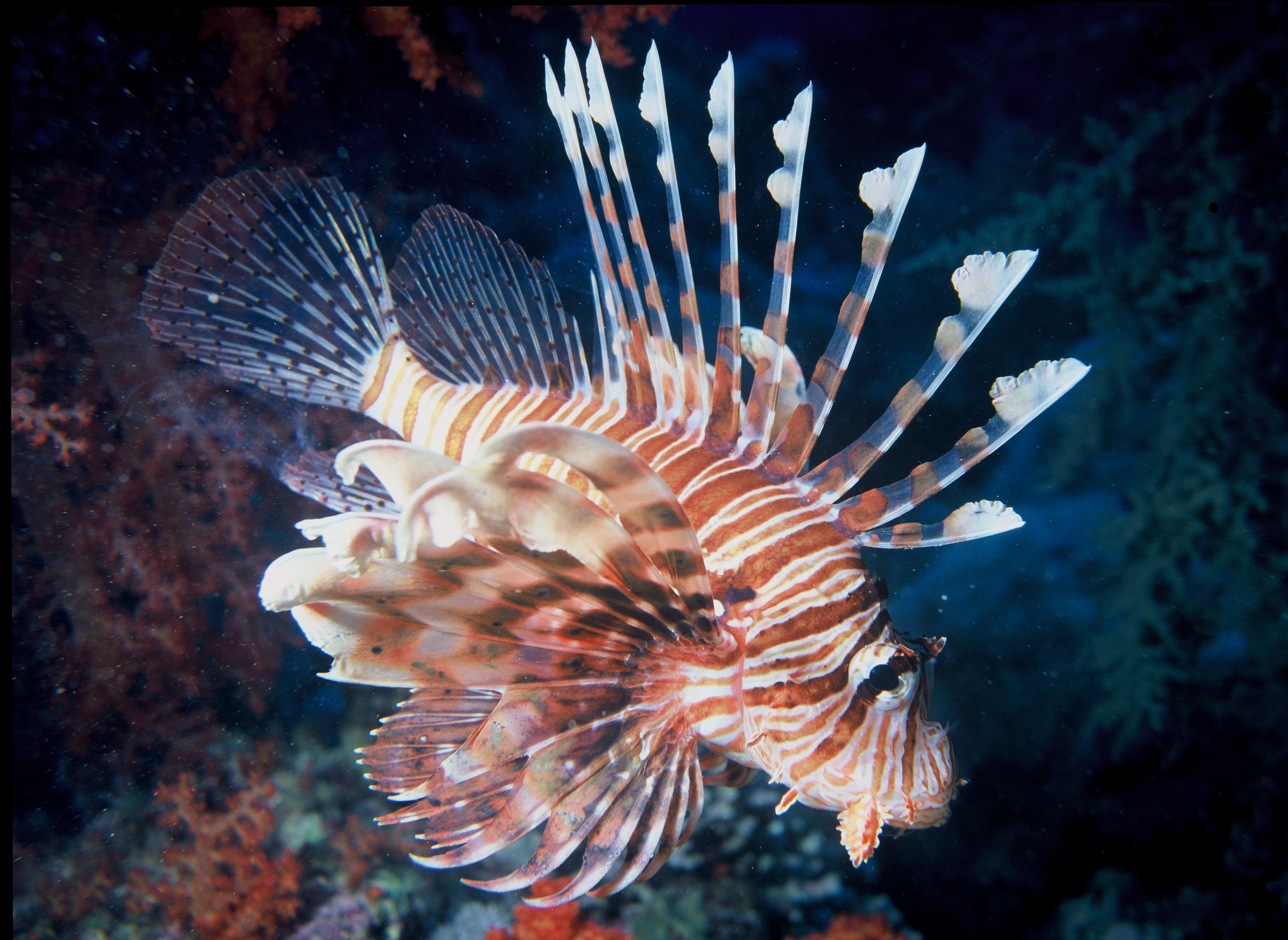
- Pterois volitans

Scientific classification
- Kingdom: Animalia
- Phylum: Chordata
- Class: Actinopterygii
- Order: Perciformes
- Family: Scorpaenidae
- Subfamily: Pteroinae; Kaup, 1873

Type species
- Scorpaena volitans Bloch, 1787

Genera
- See text

= Pteroinae =

Pteroinae Temporal range: Middle Eocene–present

Tribe of fishes

Pteroinae is a subfamily of marine ray-finned fishes in the family Scorpaenidae. This tribe includes the lionfishes, sawcheek scorpionfishes, and turkeyfishes. Previously, the fifth edition of Fishes of the World treated this group as a tribe within the subfamily Scorpaeninae of the family Scorpaenidae within the order Scorpaeniformes, while other authorities treat it as a subfamily within a reduced family Scorpaenidae within the suborder Scorpaenoidei, or the superfamily Scorpaenoidea within the order Perciformes. Presently, Eschmeyer's Catalog of Fishes treats it as a subfamily within Scorpaenidae.

== Genera ==
These seven extant genera are included in the subfamily Pteroinae, in 29 species:

Image	Genus
	Brachypterois Fowler, 1938
	Dendrochirus Swainson, 1839
	Ebosia Jordan & Starks, 1904
	Nemapterois Fowler, 1938
	Neochirus Chou, Liu & Liao, 2023
	Parapterois Bleeker, 1876
	Pterois Oken, 1817
	Pteropterus Swainson, 1839

== Fossil record ==
The only fossil record of the family is †Eopterois,Schwarzhans, Stringer & Takeuchi, 2024 known from fossil otoliths from the Middle Eocene of Mississippi, US.
