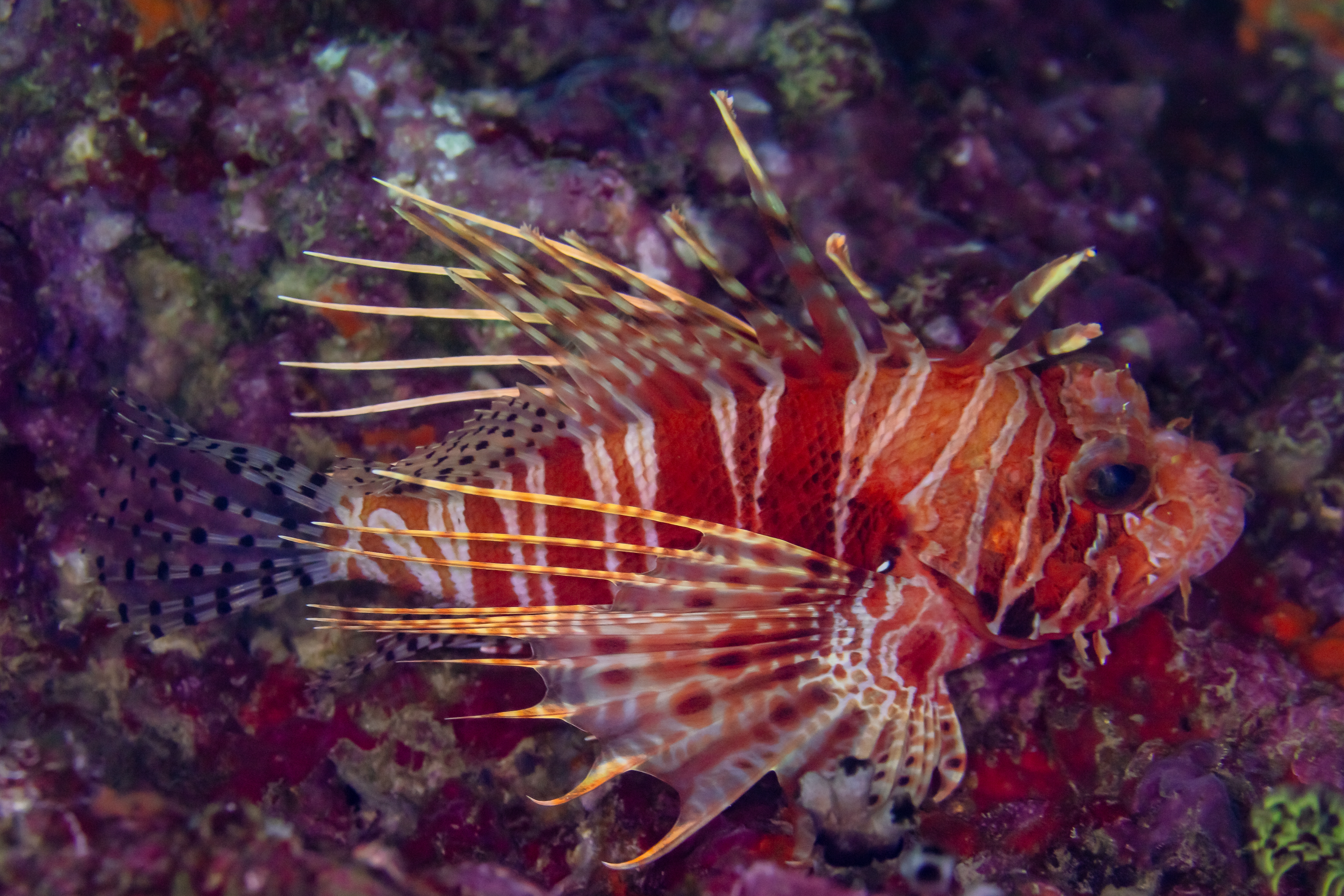

Conservation status
- Least Concern (IUCN 3.1)

Scientific classification
- Kingdom: Animalia
- Phylum: Chordata
- Class: Actinopterygii
- Order: Perciformes
- Family: Scorpaenidae
- Genus: Pteropterus
- Species: P. mombasae

Binomial name
- Pteropterus mombasae (J. L. B. Smith, 1957)

Synonyms
- Pteropterus mombasae J. L. B. Smith, 1957

= Pterois mombasae =

Species of fish

Pteropterus mombasae, the African lionfish, deepwater firefish or frillfin turkeyfish, is a species of marine ray-finned fish belonging to the family Scorpaenidae, the scorpionfishes and lionfishes. It is found in the tropical Indian Ocean, typically in soft-bottomed areas of the ocean, often in conjunction with invertebrate growth (for example, sponges). It grows to a maximum size of 20 cm, and is of moderate commercial value.

== Taxonomy ==
Pterois mombasae was first formally described in 1957 as Pteropterus mombasae by the South African ichthyologist J. L. B. Smith with the type locality given as a reef off Mombasa in Kenya. Smith noted that it seemed to most resemble Pterois sphex from Hawaii. In 2014 a new species, Pterois paucispinula, was described from the Western Pacific Ocean and the authors of that description stated that P. mombasae was restricted to the Indian Ocean and that previously the new species had been overlooked. In 2023, it was reclassified as a species of the revalidated genus Pteropterus.

The specific name refers to the type locality.

== Distribution and habitat ==
Pterois mombasae is found in the Indian Ocean from the eastern African coast between Kenya and South Africa, Madagascar and the Madives, India and east as far as the Andaman Sea.

It is a rare inhabitant of rocky bottoms on deep offshore reefs and is usually found on soft-bottom or muddy substrates with thick ridges of rubble amongst rich growths of invertebrates, particularly sponges.

== Description ==
Pterois mobasae has 13 spines and 10 soft rays in its dorsal fin and 3 spines and 6 or 7 soft rays in its anal fin. It has an oblong laterally compressed body and has either no supraoculat tentacles or they are very small. The 18-19 fin rays in the pectoral din are unbranched. The body has many brown to brownish red bars of differing widths, the bars on the caudal peduncle are thin and wavy. There s a brownish red spot, smaller in diameter than the pupil, on the lower operculum. The soft-rayed part of the dorsal fin as well as the anal and caudal fins is translucent marked with a scattering of small brownish red spots on the rays. The pelvic fin is blackish. The maximum published length is 31 cm (12 in), although a standard length of 20 cm (7.9 in) is more typical.

== Gallery ==
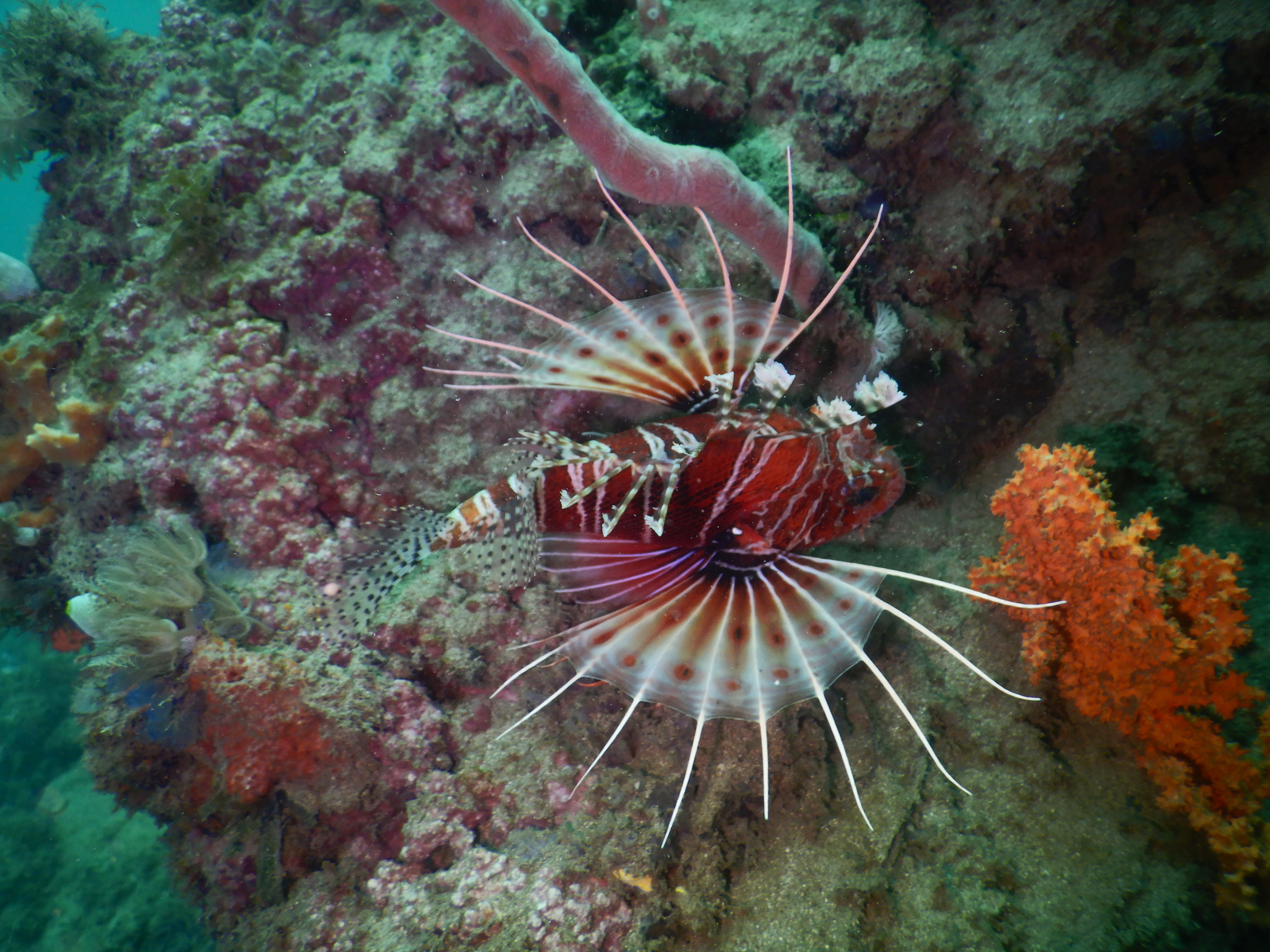

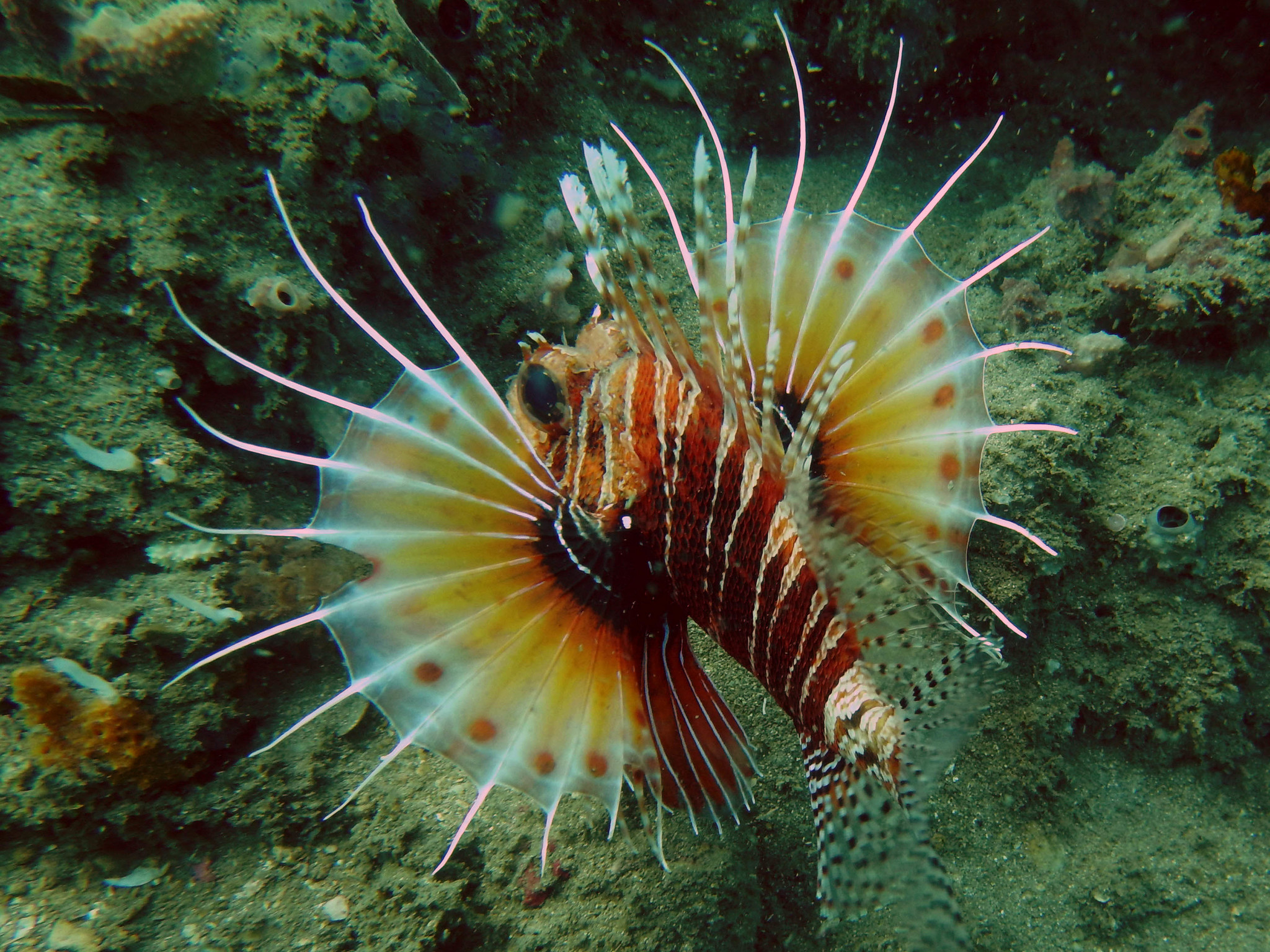

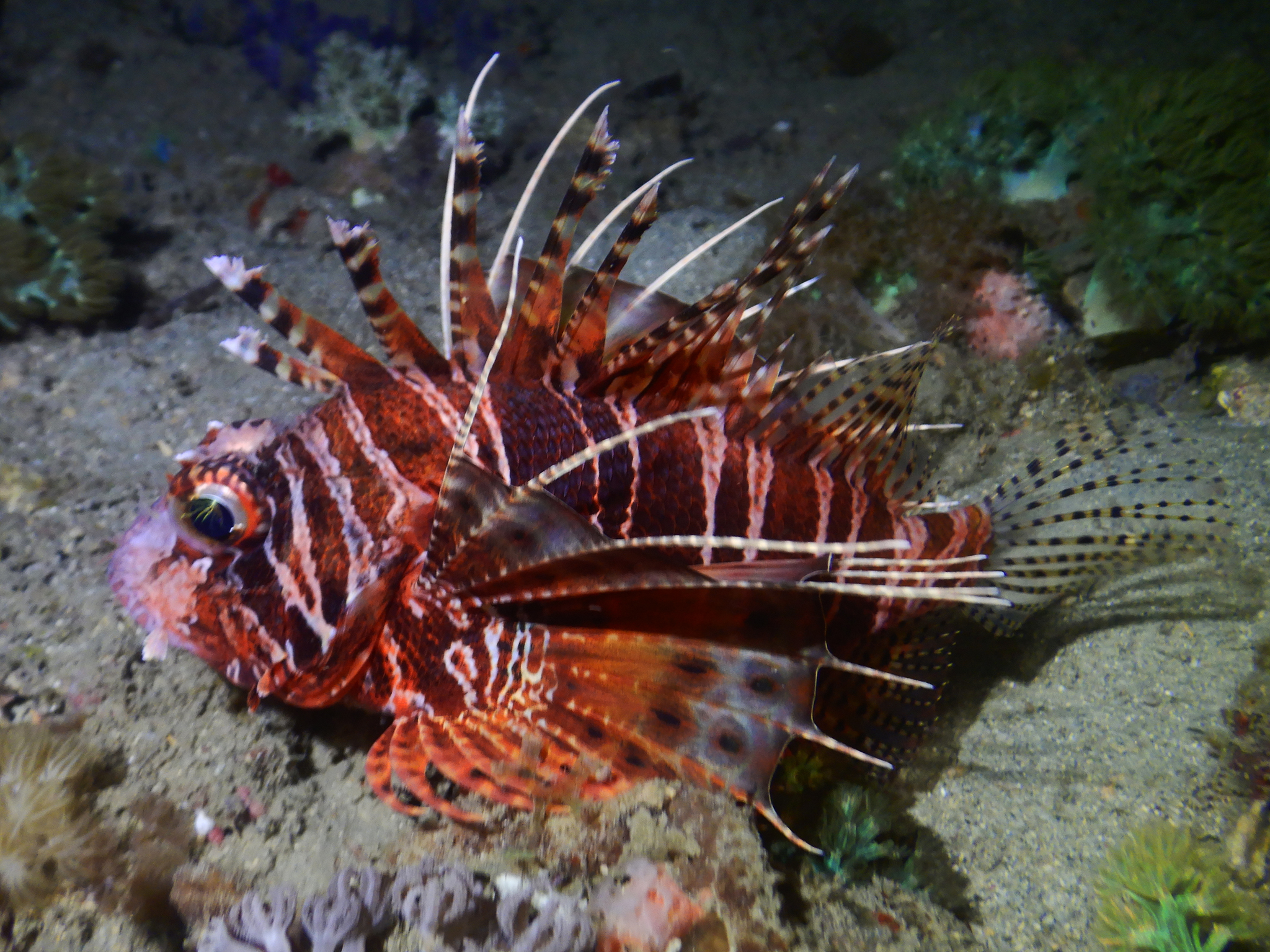

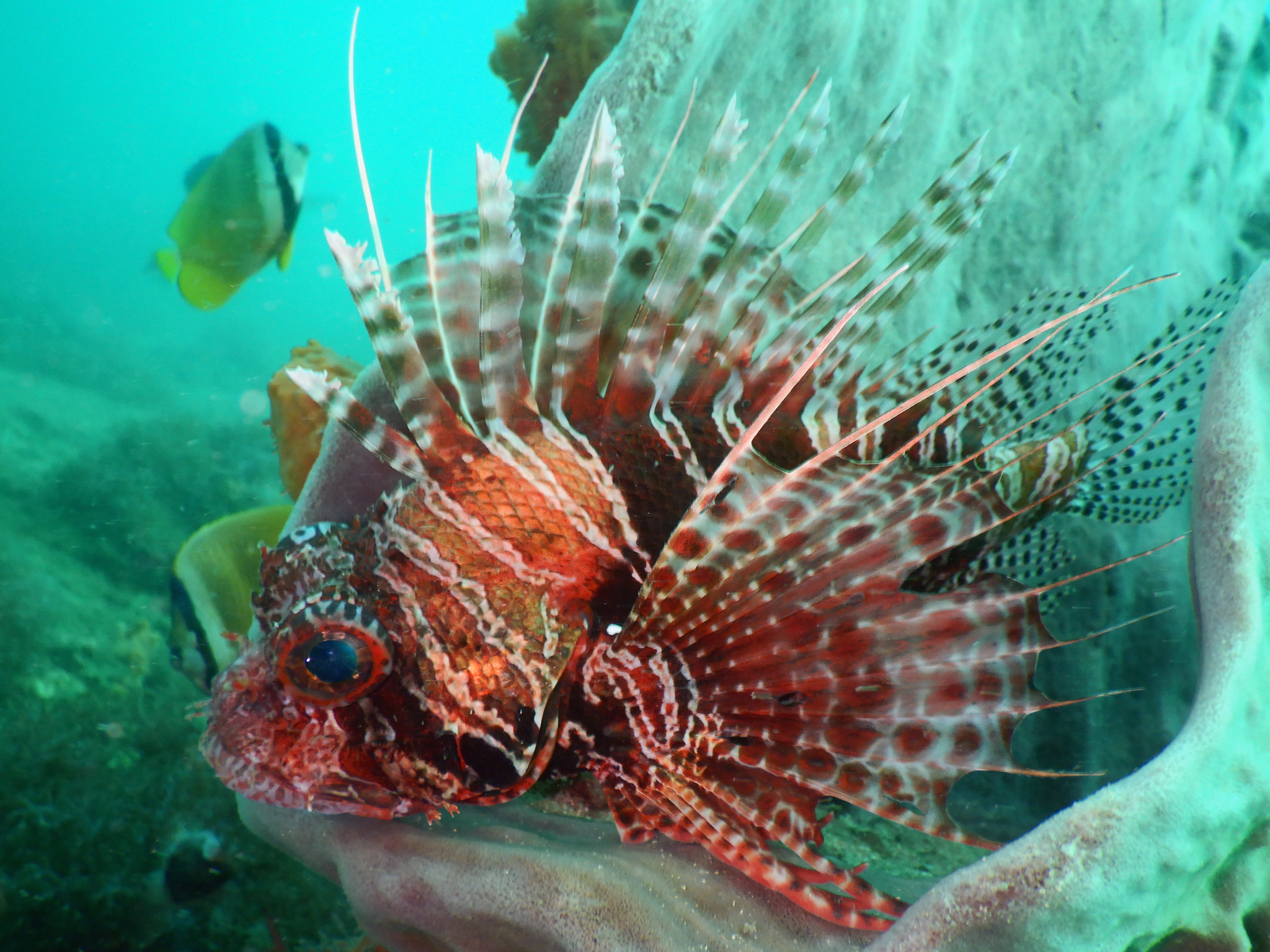

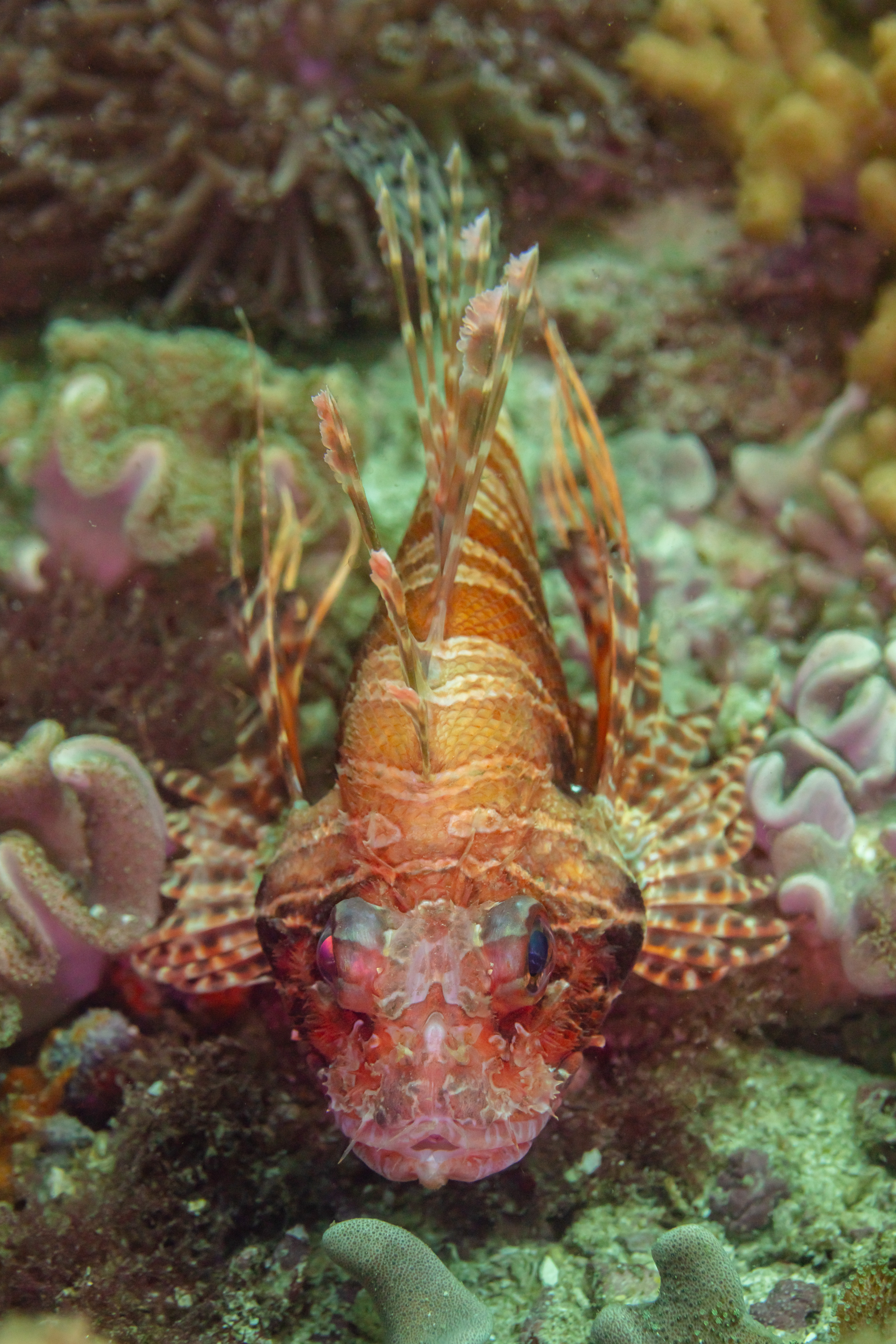
