= Fu Manchu (disambiguation) =

Fu Manchu is a fictional character created by Sax Rohmer.

Fu Manchu may also refer to:

== People ==
- David Bamberg (1904–1974), English magician who performed a character Fu Manchu on stage and screen

== Art, entertainment, and media ==
- Fu Manchu (band), an American stoner rock band
- "Fu Manchu", a song by Frank Black from his 1993 debut solo album Frank Black
- Fu Manchu (Marvel Comics), a Marvel Comics character

== Other uses ==
- Fu Manchu moustache, a mustache style
- Fu Manchu lionfish, a common name for Dendrochirus biocellatus

== See also ==
- Fu-manjū, a type of Japanese wheat gluten
