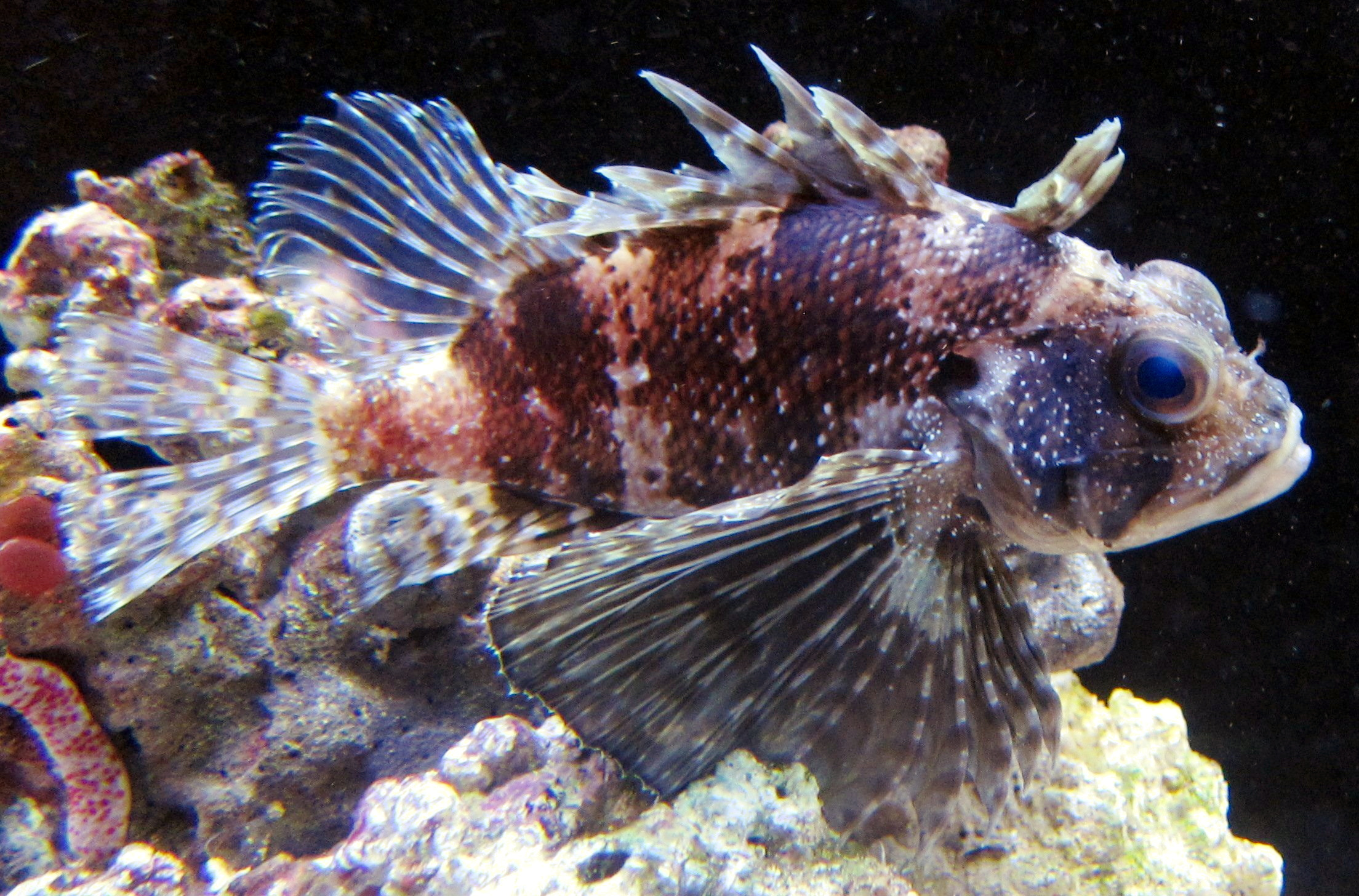

Scientific classification
- Kingdom: Animalia
- Phylum: Chordata
- Class: Actinopterygii
- Order: Perciformes
- Family: Scorpaenidae
- Subfamily: Pteroinae
- Genus: Neochirus; Chou, Liu & Liao, 2023

= Neochirus =

Genus of marine fishes

Neochirus is a genus of marine ray-finned fishes belonging to the family Scorpaenidae, the scorpionfishes.

== Taxonomy ==
The genus Neochirus includes species from the genus Dendrochirus. In 2023, Dendrochirus was found to not be a monophyletic group, so Neochirus was erected to rectify that.

== Species ==
Species in Neochirus include:

Species	Common name
Neochirus barberi (Steindachner, 1900)	Hawaiian lionfish
Neochirus bella (D. S. Jordan & C. L. Hubbs, 1925)	Bricked firefish
Neochirus brachyptera (G. Cuvier, 1829)	Shortfin turkeyfish
Neochirus hemprichi Matsunuma, Motomura & Bogorodsky, 2017	Red Sea dwarf lionfish
Neochirus tuamotuensis Matsunuma & Motomura, 2013	Tuamotu's dwarf lionfish
