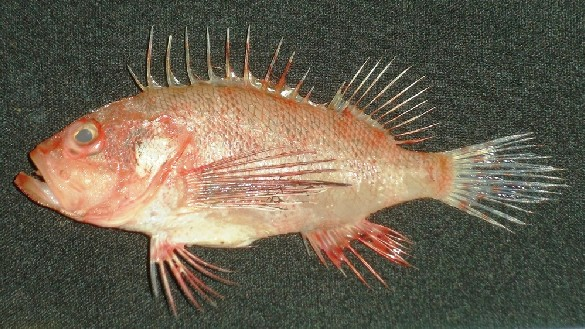
- Brachypterois serrulata

Scientific classification
- Kingdom: Animalia
- Phylum: Chordata
- Class: Actinopterygii
- Order: Perciformes
- Suborder: Scorpaenoidei
- Family: Scorpaenidae
- Subfamily: Pteroinae
- Genus: Brachypterois; Fowler, 1938

Type species
- Brachypterois serrulifer Fowler, 1938

Synonyms
- Ranipterois Whitley, 1951

= Brachypterois =

Genus

Brachypterois is a genus of marine ray-finned fishes belonging to the family Scorpaenidae, the scorpionfishes. They are native to the Indian Ocean and the western Pacific Ocean.

== Taxonomy ==
Brachypterois was first formally described in 1938 by the American zoologist Henry Weed Fowler when he described Brachypterois serrulifer, from the Philippines, as the only species in this monotypic genus. This genus is classified within the tribe Pteroini of the subfamily Scorpaeninae within the family Scorpaenidae. The genus was regarded as monotypic, with Sebastes serrulatus, which was described by John Richardson in 1846, being regarded as a senior synonym of Fowler's B. serrulifer. However, a review of the genus published in 2013 and which examined many specimens of Brachypterois from across the wide distribution of the genus concluded that there were 3 valid species within the genus and that Fowler's B. serrilifer was a separate species from Richardson's B. serrulata. The genus name prefixes brachy, which means "short", to the genus name Pterois, a reference to the shorter dorsal fin spines of these fishes compared to the Pterois species.

== Species ==
There are currently three recognized species in this genus:

- Brachypterois curvispina Matsunuma, M. Sakurai & Motomura, 2013 (Australian sawcheek scorpionfish)
- Brachypterois serrulata (J. Richardson, 1846) (Sawcheek scorpionfish)
- Brachypterois serrulifer Fowler, 1938 (Sawmaxilla scorpionfish)

== Characteristics ==
Brachypterois is characterised by having a dorsal fin spine count which is typically 13, but is infrequently 12 or 14, 3 spines in the anal fin, 5-8 branched rays in the caudal fin with 3 procurrent rays on either side. The maxilla is clothed in scales; there are clear ridges on the jaw; the intraorbital space is flat and has scales. The dorsal, anal and pelvic fin spines have clear notches which contain venom glands. There are no palatine teeth. The orbit and the suborbital ridge distinctly closed. There are 5 spines on the preoperculum. These are relatively small species which range in maximum total length from 12.6 cm (5.0 in) in B. curvispina to 15.5 cm (6.1 in) in B. serrulifer.

== Distribution ==
Brachyterois scorpionfishes are found in the Indo-Pacific region, the most widespread species is B. serrulifer which is found from East Africa to the Philippines, B. curvispina is endemic to northeastern Australia and B. serrulata is found in the western pacific from the Gulf of Thailand to southern Japan.
