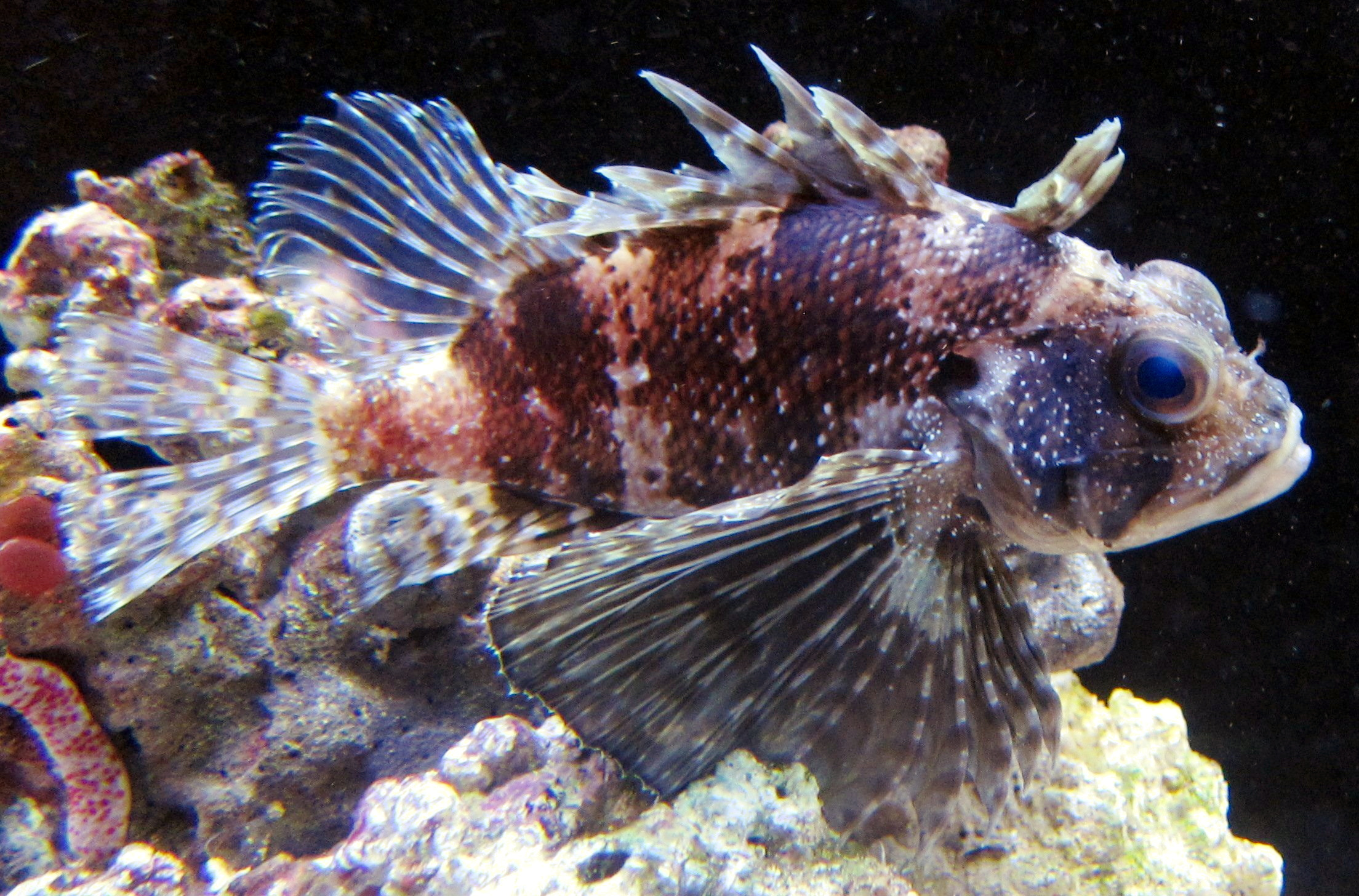

Conservation status
- Least Concern (IUCN 3.1)

Scientific classification
- Kingdom: Animalia
- Phylum: Chordata
- Class: Actinopterygii
- Order: Perciformes
- Family: Scorpaenidae
- Genus: Neochirus
- Species: N. barberi

Binomial name
- Neochirus barberi (Steindachner, 1900)

Synonyms
- Pterois barberi Steindachner, 1900; Dendrochirus chloreus Jenkins, 1903; Dendrochirus hudsoni Jordan & Evermann, 1903

= Neochirus barberi =

Species of fish

Dendrochirus barberi, the Hawaiian lionfish or green lionfish, is a species of marine ray-finned fish belonging to the family Scorpaenidae, the scorpionfishes and lionfishes. It occurs in the Eastern Central Pacific. It occasionally makes its way into the aquarium trade.

== Taxonomy ==
Dendrochirus barberi Was first formally described in 1900 as Pterois barberi by the Austrian ichthyologist Franz Steindachner with the type locality given as between Honolulu and Cape Horn, although it was actually near the Hawaiian Islands. This species is part of the brachypterus species complex within the genus Dendrochirus. The specific name honours Captain Barber who caught the holotype among plankton on the voyage from Honolulu to Cape Horn in 1896-97. Steindachner gave no further information about Captain Barber.

== Description ==
Dendrochirus barberi has 13 spines and nine soft rays in its dorsal fin and three spines and five soft rays in its anal fin. The spines in the dorsal fin are more than half the depth of the body, separated by deeply notched membranes. It has a large pectoral fin in which the upper rays are branched towards their tips. There are coronal spines, and large specimens may have some branches on the spines on the head. The suborbital ridge has a single row of spines and not a wide patch of minute spinules. The supraocular tentacle may be present and is short, with a length less than the diameter of the orbit and is typically absent. The overall color of the head and body is orange-brown with many scattered, small white spots, whitish on the lower body. There are three poorly marked wide brownish bands on the head; the front band is below the eye, the middle band runs diagonally across the eye from the base of the supraocular spine to the interopercle and the rear band saddles the nape at the base of the parietal spine. There are six indistinct brownish vertical bands on the flanks; the five forward bands are underneath the dorsal fin base, and extend onto the fin membrane. The two bands over the anal fin extend onto its fin membrane and the rearmost band is on the caudal peduncle. All of these bands fade as the fish grows. The color of the eyes is orange-red with a black iris. The spiny part of the dorsal fin is whitish, with 2–4 irregular orange-brown bands on each spine, and the soft-rayed part is semi-translucent marked with many small dark spots on the fin rays. The pectoral fin is also whitish and marked with around eight indistinct irregular brown bands and brownish mottles on its rear half. The pelvic fin is grayish-white and marked with a few vague brown bands. The spiny part of the anal fin is also grayish-white and the soft-rayed part is semi-translucent, like the soft rayed part of the dorsal fin, and also has many small dark spots on each ray. The caudal fin is white and there are numerous small dark spots on its rays. This species attains a maximum total length of 16.5 cm (6.5 in).

== Distribution and habitat ==
Dendrochirus barberi is found in the eastern central Pacific where it is endemic to the Hawaiian Islands and Johnston Atoll. It lives in waters of less than 50 m (160 ft) depth, on coral or in rocky crevices, in clear seaward reefs or in turbid lagoons.

== Biology ==
Dendrochirus berberi spends the day hiding in crevices and caves but appears to become benthopelagic during the night hours. It feeds on small fishes and crustaceans.

== Utilisation ==
Dendrochirus barberi is infrequent in the aquarium trade; specimens traded are wild caught. The impact of catching these fishes to sell in the aquarium trade is not understood.
