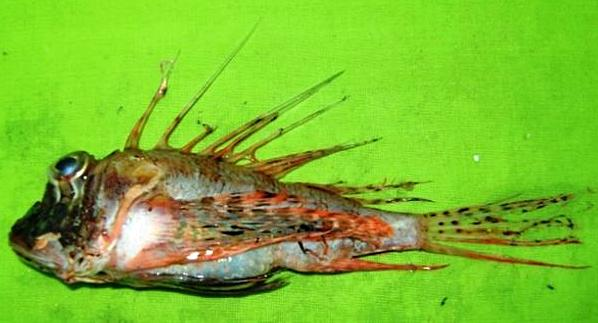

Conservation status
- Least Concern (IUCN 3.1)

Scientific classification
- Kingdom: Animalia
- Phylum: Chordata
- Class: Actinopterygii
- Order: Perciformes
- Family: Scorpaenidae
- Genus: Parapterois
- Species: P. macrura

Binomial name
- Parapterois macrura (Alcock, 1896)

Synonyms
- Pterois macrura Alcock, 1896

= Parapterois macrura =

Species of fish

Parapterois macrura is a species of marine ray-finned fish belonging to the family Scorpaenidae, the scorpionfishes. It is found in the western Indian Ocean.

== Taxonomy ==
Parapterois macrura was first formally described as Pterois macrura in 1896 by the English naturalist Alfred William Alcock with the type locality given as the Malabar Coast off Calicut. The specific name macrura means "large tail", an allusion to the filamentous extension of the upper caudal fin ray, which is as long as the body from the eye back.

== Description ==
Parapterois macrura generally grows to a length of 11 centimetres (4.3 in).

P. macrura and P. heterura differ in that P. heterura has scales in a pit between the posterior nostrils while P. macrura does not (except for a population of P. heterura found off the coasts of West India, South Africa, and Mozambique, which may be a different species). These species do not differ much in fin spine, fin ray, gill raker counts, and most body proportions. Their differences lie in a small difference in head proportions. Also, in adults, the upper margin of the eye of P. heterura is below the base of the first dorsal fin spine, while it is above in P. macrura (this trait is not consistent in juveniles, in which the eye margin may be below in both species).

== Distribution and habitat ==
Parapterois macrura is found in the northwestern Indian Ocean in the Arabian Sea and has been recorded from the coast of Somalia, Oman, Pakistan and southwestern India. It is found at depths between 64 and 130 m (210 and 427 ft) and its habitat preference is thought to similar to that of P. heterura, sheltered coastal bays to deeper waters where there are fine sand or silt substrates.
