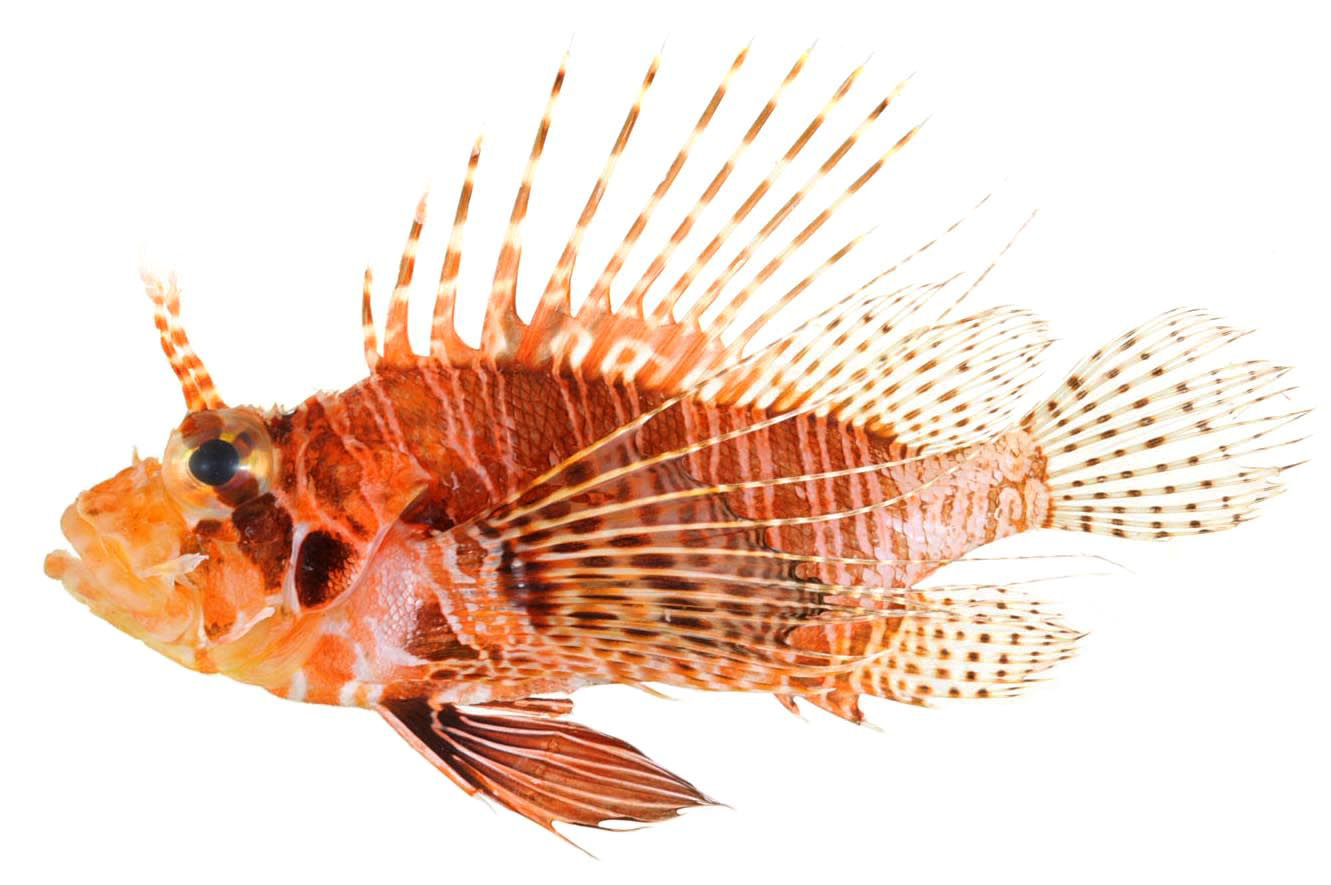

Conservation status
- Least Concern (IUCN 3.1)

Scientific classification
- Kingdom: Animalia
- Phylum: Chordata
- Class: Actinopterygii
- Order: Perciformes
- Family: Scorpaenidae
- Genus: Pteropterus
- Species: P. paucispinula

Binomial name
- Pteropterus paucispinula Matsunuma & Motomura, 2015

= Pterois paucispinula =

Species of fish

Pteropterus paucispinula is a species of marine ray-finned fish belonging to the family Scorpaenidae, the scorpionfishes and lionfishes. It is found in the Western Pacific Ocean.

== Taxonomy ==
Pterois paucispinula was first formally described in 2015 by the Japanese ichthyologists Mizuki Matsunuma and Hiroyuki Motomura with the type locality given as Kashiwa-jima Island in Kōchi Prefecture in southern Japan. P. paucispinula had been regarded as the eastern population of the frillfin lionfish (P.mombasae). In 2023, it was reclassified as a species of the revalidated genus Pteropterus.

=== Etymology ===
The specific name paucispinula is a compound of paucus, meaning "few", and spinula, which means "small thorn", referring to the reduced number of small spines on the ctenoid scales of the head and body compared to P. mombasae.

== Description ==
Pterois paucispinula has 13 spines and 10, rarely 11, soft rays in its dorsal fin and 3 spines and 6 soft rays in its anal fin. There are between 17 and 19 rays in the pectoral fins, the most common count being 18. The overall colour is pinkish creamy-white or white. There is a wide white-edged reddish-black to black band running through the eye with a sizeable black blotch on the lower part of the operculum. There are 3 bands on the nape, the flanks have many wide reddish-brown to light brown bands, with thin narrow bands between them, and these reach just onto the dorsal and anal fins. There is a relatively large black blotch, which has a small white spot within it, over the base of the pectoral-fin. The spiny part of the dorsal fin has 2–6 reddish-brown to blackish bands while the soft-rayed part of the dorsal fin as well as the anal and caudal fins, have numerous small black spots on their membranes,. The pectoral fin has 14 to 28 large reddish-black to black blotches on it. This species attains a maximum published standard length of 14.4 cm (5.7 in).

P. paucispinula differs from P. mombasae by, among other things, having a body which is not as deep, a narrower head and slightly more scale rows below the lateral line. It also typically has 18 pectoral-fin rays, whereas the western populations of P. mombasae typically have 19. Additionally, it also has comparatively longer spines in the dorsal fin. However, a Sri Lankan population of P. mombasae is more similar to P. paucispinula in that they usually have 18 pectoral-fin rays and longer dorsal fin spines, these differences among populations of P. mombasae are considered to be geographical variations within the species. A consistently differing feature is that both young and adult P. mombasae have ctenoid scales on the base of the pectoral fin, the part of the body below the lateral line and on the side of the caudal peduncle. In P. paucispinula these areas typically only have only cycloid or at most a few ctenoid scales.

== Distribution and habitat ==
Pterois paucispinula is found in the western Pacific Ocean where it occurs from Indonesia in the west to as far as Wallis And Futuna Islands in the east, extending north to southern Japan and south to northern Australia. In Australian waters it is known from the Northwest Shelf of Western Australia to the Timor Sea off the northwest of Melville Island in the Northern Territory. This species is found at depths between 1 and 440 m (3 ft 3 in and 1,443 ft 7 in) where it is typically found in areas of soft-bottom or muddy substrates mixed with rubble areas where there is dense growth of sessile invertebrates, particularly sponges.

== Biology ==
Pterois paucispinula is normally encountered in small groups or as a solitary fish.
