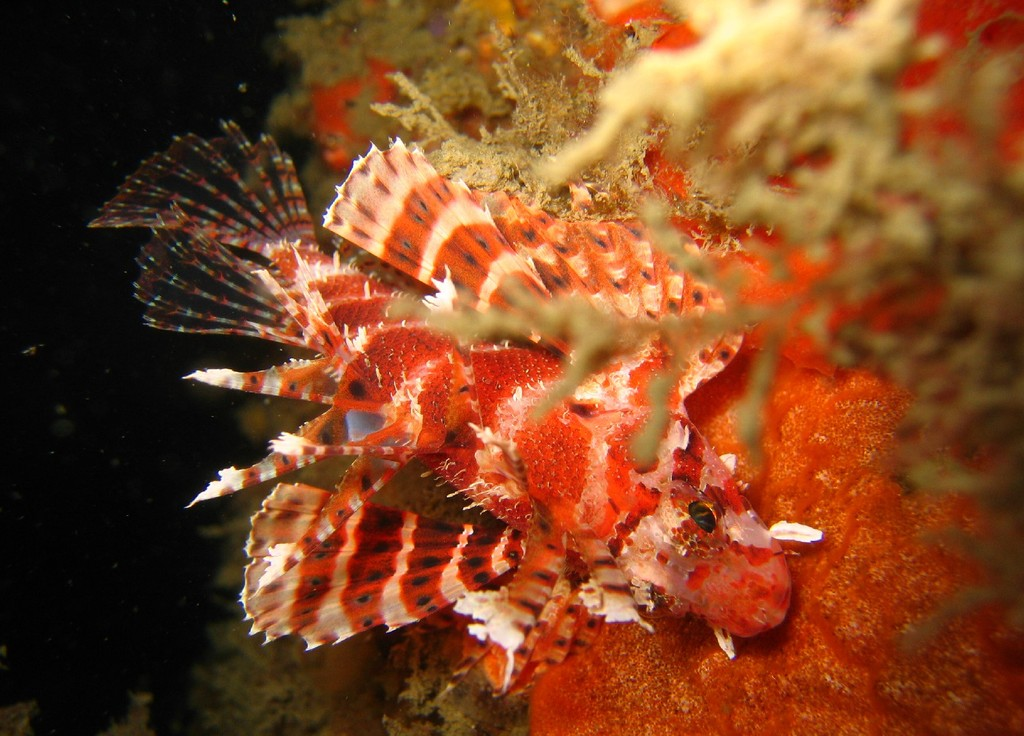

Conservation status
- Least Concern (IUCN 3.1)

Scientific classification
- Kingdom: Animalia
- Phylum: Chordata
- Class: Actinopterygii
- Order: Perciformes
- Family: Scorpaenidae
- Genus: Neochirus
- Species: N. brachypterus

Binomial name
- Neochirus brachypterus (Cuvier, 1829)

Synonyms
- Pterois brachyptera Cuvier, 1829

= Neochirus brachypterus =

Species of fish

Neochirus brachypterus, the dwarf lionfish, short-finned turkeyfish, shortspine rockcod or shortspine scorpionfish, is a species of marine ray-finned fish belonging to the family Scorpaenidae, the scorpionfishes and lionfishes. It is found in the Indo-Pacific. It is sometimes found in the aquarium trade.

== Taxonomy ==
Neochirus brachypterus was first formally described in 1829 as Pterois brachyptera by the French zoologist Georges Cuvier with no type locality given.. The specific name means "short-finned", an allusion to the relatively short pectoral fins compared to Dendrochirus zebra, which Cuvier first described in the same publication. This species was previously placed in the genus Dendrochirus; a 2023 molecular and morphological phylogenetic study of the lionfishes reassigned it to the newly erected Neochirus.

== Description ==
Neochirus brachypterus has 13 spines and 9 or 10 soft rays in its dorsal fin, the middle spines of the dorsal fin are shorter than the depth of the body, and there are 3 spines and 5 soft rays in the anal fin. The background colour is dusky mottled brown to reddish-brown broken by darker bars on the body. The pectoral fins are distinctly banded. There is a short tentacle over the eye and leaf-like appendages on the head and along the lateral line which vary in their development. There are no filaments on the pelvic fins. There are black spots edged with red on the filaments extending from the dorsal spines and there are 8-10 dark bars on pectoral fins. This species attains a maximum published total length of 17 cm (6.7 in).

== Distribution and habitat ==
Neochirus brachypterus has a wide Indo-Pacific distribution from the eastern coast of Africa from the Red Sea south to South Africa and eastwards to Samoa, north to the Philippines and south to Australia. In Australian waters, this species occurs from the Houtman Abrolhos in Western Australia to Sydney in New South Wales, as well as Lord Howe Island in the Tasman Sea. The dwarf lionfish is found at depths between 1 and 80 m (3 ft 3 in and 262 ft 6 in) in reef flats and shallow lagoons, where there are weed-covered rocks on sandy substrates.

== Biology ==
Neochirus brachypterus is a nocturnal predator of small crustaceans. The adults are frequently found on sponges while small aggregations of up to 10 juveniles frequent reef outcrops. During the day, it shelters in caves and crevices and among sponges . The males and females form pairs to mate, and the females have specialised structures on the ovaries, including stalk-like egg-creating lamellae and secretory cells in the epithelium. The dorsal fin spines are venomous.

== Use ==
Neochirus brachypterus is used as a food fish in some subsistence fisheries. It is occasionally seen in the aquarium trade. It has laid eggs in captivity, but raising the young has proved very difficult.
