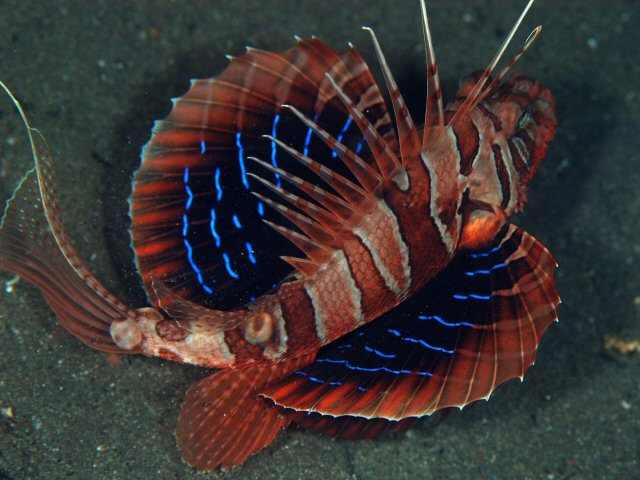

Conservation status
- Least Concern (IUCN 3.1)

Scientific classification
- Kingdom: Animalia
- Phylum: Chordata
- Class: Actinopterygii
- Order: Perciformes
- Family: Scorpaenidae
- Genus: Parapterois
- Species: P. heterura

Binomial name
- Parapterois heterura (Bleeker, 1856)

Synonyms
- Ebosia pavo Schmidt, 1931; Ebosia starksi Franz, 1910; Parapterois heterurus (Bleeker, 1856); Pterois heterurus Bleeker, 1856; Pterois jordani Regan, 1905; Pterois natalensis von Bonde, 1923; Pterois nigripinnis Gilchrist, 1904; Pterois tanabensis Tanaka, 1918

= Parapterois heterura =

Species of fish

Parapterois heterura, the blackfoot firefish, blackfoot firefish, blue-fin lionfish, black-Foot lionfish or gurnard lionfish, is a species of marine ray-finned fish belonging to the family Scorpaenidae, the scorpionfishes. It is widely distributed on the southeastern coast of Africa as well as off Japan and in Indonesia where it is usually found in sheltered coastal bays with a soft bottom, such as fine sand or mud. It is found in depths ranging from 40 to 300 metres (130 to 980 ft). This species is a sedentary fish and may even bury itself within the substrate. P. heterura flashes its brightly colored pectoral fins to startle predators and escape, but it may also use these fins to corner prey. This behavior has been demonstrated in other lionfish. This species can be found in the aquarium trade.

== Taxonomy ==
Parapterois heterura was first formally described as Pterois heterurus in 1856 by the Dutch physician, herpetologist and ichthyologist Pieter Bleeker with the type locality given as Ambon Island. It is the type species of the genus Parapterois which Bleeker described in 1876. Some authorities consider that the population in the southwestern Indian Ocean, which was described as Pterois nigripinnis by the Scottish born South African ichthyologist John Dow Fisher Gilchrist in 1904 from the mouth of the Ohlanga River in KwaZulu-Natal in South Africa, is a valid species Parapterois nigripinnis. The specific name heterura means "different tail" an allusion to the long, flared tail with the upper ray having a filamentous extension.

== Description ==
Parapterois heterura grows to a maximum length of 38 cm (15 in) TL, however, most specimens are much smaller than this and adults are often about 11 cm (4.3 in) in length. The dorsal fin of this fish has thirteen spines with long filaments on their tips, and nine soft rays. The anal fins have two spines and seven to eight soft rays. The outer rays of the caudal fin also have filamentous extensions.

Parapterois heterura is very similar in appearance to the closely related Parapterois macrura. The two species differ in that P. heterura has scales in a pit between the posterior nostrils while P. macrura does not (except for a population of P. heterura found off the coasts of West India, South Africa, and Mozambique, which may be a different species). These species do not differ much in fin spine, fin ray, gill raker counts, and most body proportions. Their differences lie in a small difference in head proportions. Also, in adults, the upper margin of the eye of P. heterura is below the base of the first dorsal fin spine, while it is above in P. macrura (this trait is not consistent in juveniles, in which the eye margin may be below in both species).

== Distribution ==
This fish seems to have two separate ranges. One is on the coast of Natal in southeastern Africa and the other is in the central Indo-Pacific covering Japan, Indonesia, New Guinea and Australia.

== Behavior ==
Parapterois heterura is largely nocturnal and may partially bury itself in the substrate during the day making it difficult to spot. The brightly colored pectoral fins are flared if the fish is disturbed and may startle predators but their main purpose seems to be to help corner prey when hunting. This fish feeds on small fish and bottom-dwelling invertebrates.
