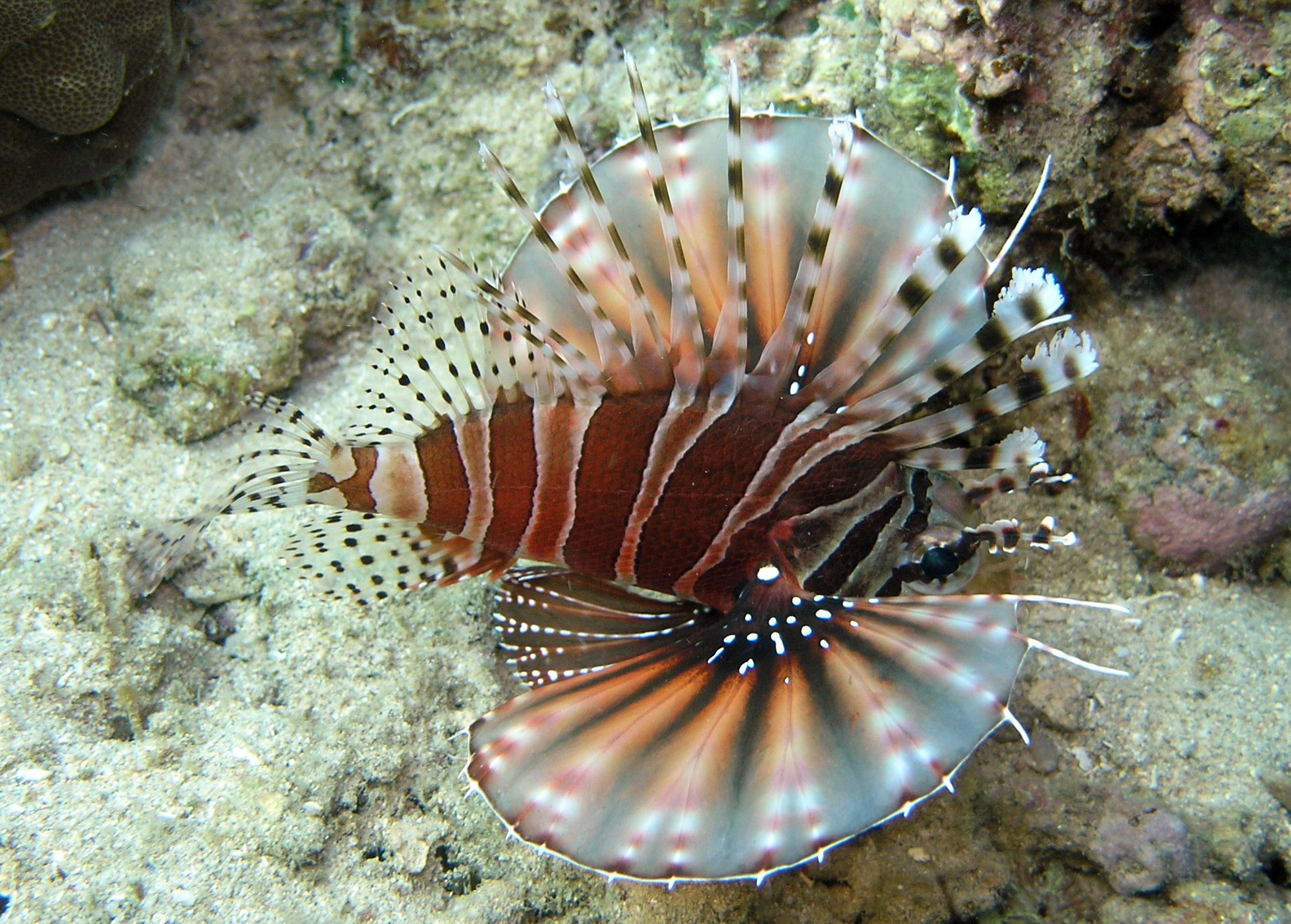

Conservation status
- Least Concern (IUCN 3.1)

Scientific classification
- Kingdom: Animalia
- Phylum: Chordata
- Class: Actinopterygii
- Division: Teleostei
- Order: Perciformes
- Family: Scorpaenidae
- Genus: Dendrochirus
- Species: D. zebra

Binomial name
- Dendrochirus zebra (Cuvier, 1829)

Synonyms
- Pterois zebra Cuvier, 1829; Pseudomonopterus zebra (Cuvier, 1829)

= Dendrochirus zebra =

Species of fish

Dendrochirus zebra, known commonly as the zebra turkeyfish or zebra lionfish among other vernacular names, is a species of marine fish in the family Scorpaenidae.

The zebra turkeyfish is widespread throughout the tropical waters of the Indo-West Pacific, including the Red Sea.

== Description ==
The zebra turkeyfish is a scorpaenid fish with vertical stripes in orange, white, and black on its body, and large, banded, fan-like pectoral fins that flare out on either side as the fish lies on the seabed. The front dorsal fin is made up of 13 tall, quill-like spines and the second dorsal fin has 10 or 11 soft rays. The anal fin has three spines and about 10 soft rays. The second dorsal fin, the anal fin, and the rounded caudal fin are transversely banded in black and white. This fish grows to a maximum length around 25 cm (10 in).

== Distribution and habitat ==
The zebra turkeyfish is native to the Indo-Pacific region from the Red Sea to Indonesia and eastern Australia. It is found in inshore waters down to a depth of about 80 m (262 ft). It is a bottom-dwelling species and is found on coral, pebble, and rock bottoms on reef flats, outer reefs and lagoons and also in caves, sometimes in small groups.

== Biology ==
This member of the scorpionfish family has 13 venomous spines along its back, used to defend itself. These spines are connected with a clear, film-like membrane. These fish are slow-moving and peaceful, but can be dangerous. They have a habit of resting in places hidden from light such as under a rock or a piece of coral. All lionfish are immune to each other's venom.

== Behavior ==
While originally described as solitary predators, zebra lionfish have more recently been observed exhibiting gregarious behavior both in the wild and in a laboratory setting, living and hunting together in groups of two or three.

When hunting in groups, zebra lionfish herd their prey into a confined area using their venomous dorsal spines and flaring their fins to create a barrier. Individuals were observed taking turns striking at prey, and occasionally blowing jets of water at prey. Group hunting and water jet blowing behaviors have also been observed in invasive red lionfish in the Caribbean. Signaling turns in striking and fin flaring during group hunting observed in zebra lionfish, red lionfish, and spotfin lionfish may indicate that the cooperative signaling and gregarious hunting behaviors may be characteristic of the lionfish family as a whole.

The zebra lionfish feeds on small crustaceans and fish, and is in turn preyed upon by groupers.
