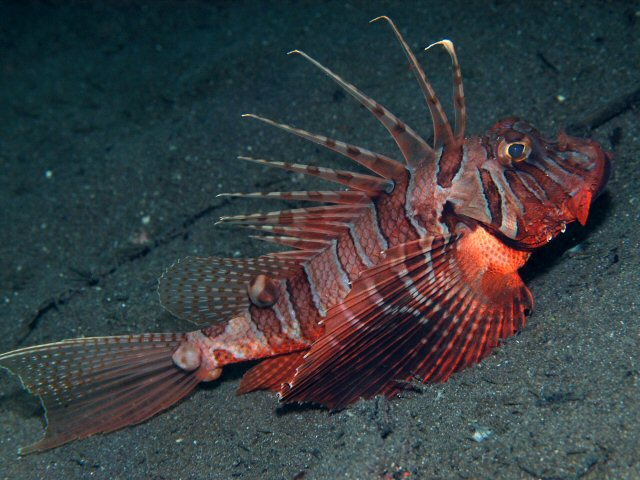
- Parapterois heterura, blackfoot firefish

Scientific classification
- Kingdom: Animalia
- Phylum: Chordata
- Class: Actinopterygii
- Order: Perciformes
- Family: Scorpaenidae
- Subfamily: Pteroinae
- Genus: Parapterois; Bleeker, 1876

Type species
- Pterois heterura Bleeker, 1856

Synonyms
- Parabrachirus Matsubara, 1943

= Parapterois =

Genus of fishes

Parapterois is a genus of marine ray-finned fishes belonging to the family Scorpaenidae, the scorpionfishes. These fish originate from marine environments in the Indian Ocean or near it. The venomous Parapterois heterura is occasionally seen as an aquarium fish.

== Taxonomy ==
Parapterois was described as a genus in 1876 by the Dutch physician, herpetologist and ichthyologist Pieter Bleeker, Bleeker designated Pterois heterurus, which he had described from Ambon Island in 1856, as the type species of the new genus. This genus is classified within the tribe Pteroini of the subfamily Scorpaeninae within the family Scorpaenidae. The genus name is a compound of para meaning "near" and Pterois, the genus Bleeker originally placed P. heterura in.

== Species ==
There are currently two recognized species in this genus:

Image	Scientific name	Distribution
	Parapterois heterura (Bleeker, 1856) (Blackfoot firefish)	southeastern coast of Africa as well as off Japan and in Indonesia
	Parapterois macrura (Alcock, 1896)	west coast of India

A third species, Parapterois nigripinnis (Gilchrist, 1904) of the southwestern Indian Ocean, is recognised as valid by the Catalog of Fishes but FishBase treats it as a synonym of P. heterura.

== Anatomy and appearance ==
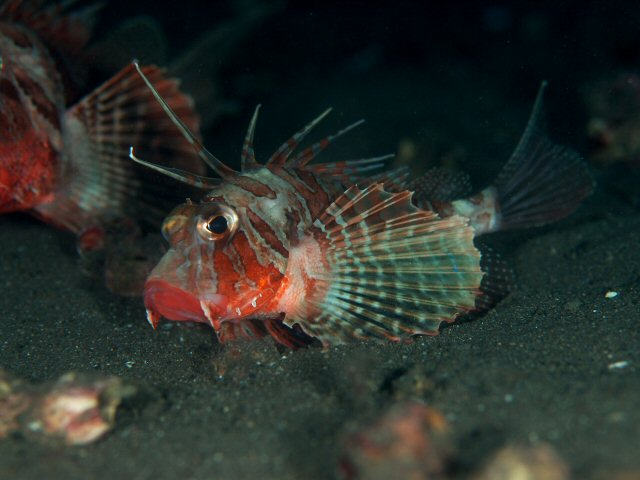
Parapterois heterura resting on the substrate

Parapterois bodies are red and white, and their pectoral fins are expanded. These fish are venomous. However, most specimens are much smaller; larger adults of both species are about 11 centimetres (4 in) in length.

A number of differences set this genus apart from Pterois, in which P. heterura was first described to. Parapterois have more (18–21) pectoral fin rays than Pterois (12–17), and, in the former, these rays may be branched, while they are never branched in Pterois. Parapterois have two anal fin spines, while Pterois have three. Also, as a more obvious trait, the caudal fin of these fish are truncated with longer upper and lower caudal fin rays, while the caudal fin in Pterois is rounded.

== Distribution and habitat ==
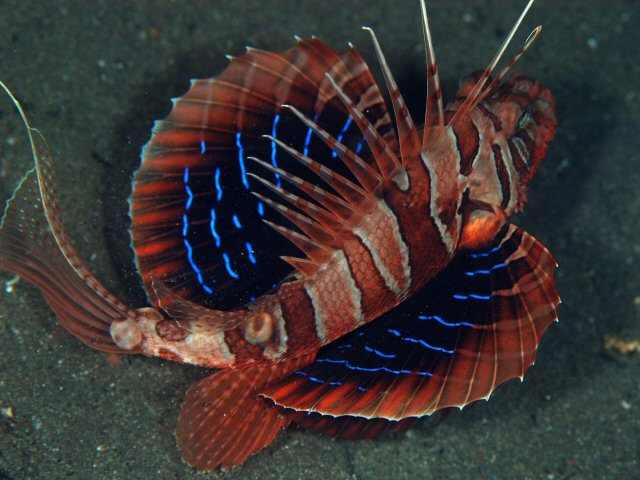
Parapterois heterura showing the inner surface of its pectoral fins.

Parapterois are native to the Indian Ocean and the West Pacific Ocean.

== In the aquarium ==
Despite the popularity of other lionfish, Parapterois species are only rarely found in the aquarium trade. P. heterura can be found on certain online marine aquarium fish stores, but is not common.
