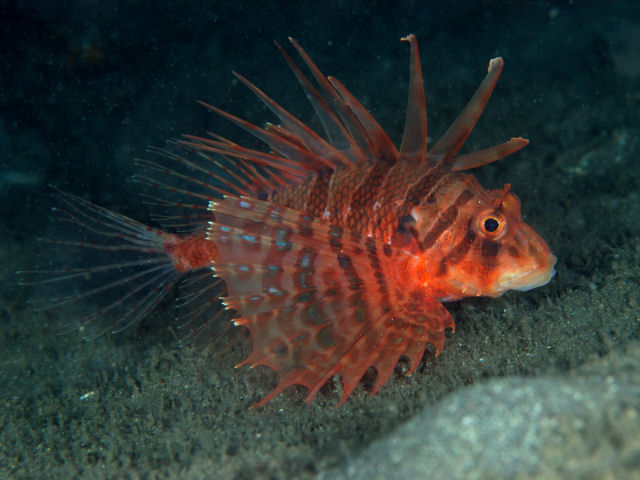
- Ebosia bleekeri

Scientific classification
- Kingdom: Animalia
- Phylum: Chordata
- Class: Actinopterygii
- Order: Perciformes
- Family: Scorpaenidae
- Subfamily: Pteroinae
- Genus: Ebosia; D. S. Jordan & Starks, 1904

Type species
- Pterois bleekeri Döderlein, 1884

= Ebosia =

Genus of fishes

Ebosia is a genus of marine ray-finned fishes belonging to the family Scorpaenidae, the scorpionfishes. They are known as falcate lionfishes. They are native to the Indian and Pacific Oceans.

== Taxonomy ==
Ebosia was described as a genus in 1904 by the American ichthyologists David Starr Jordan and Edwin Chapin Starks in 1904 with Pterois bleekeri, which had been described in 1884 by Ludwig Heinrich Philipp Döderlein from Tokyo, as the type species. This genus is classified within the tribe Pteroini of the subfamily Scorpaeninae within the family Scorpaenidae. The genus name is a latinisation of eboshi, a type of helmet which bears some resemblance to the parietal crests shown by the males in this genus.

== Species ==
There are currently 4 recognized species in this genus:

| Image | Scientific name | Common name | Distribution |
|---|---|---|---|
| | Ebosia bleekeri (Döderlein, 1884) | Bleeker's lionfish | southern Japan to Hong Kong, Also from Australia, Taiwan, China and Korea |
| | Ebosia falcata Eschmeyer & Rama Rao, 1978 | Falcate lionfish | Somalia, Pakistan and the west coast of India and off the Andaman Sea coast of Thailand. |
| | Ebosia saya Matsunuma & Motomura, 2014 | Saya lionfish | Saya de Malha Bank |
| | Ebosia vespertina Matsunuma & Motomura, 2015 | Western falcate lionfish | Mozambique and the east coast of South Africa, Madagascar |

== Characteristics ==
Ebosia lionfishes are characterised by having the bases of the spines on the nuchal, parietal and coronal bones being continuous with the parietal spine being longer and, in males, creates a slender, bony crest. These lionfishes vary in size from a maximum published standard length of 8.7 cm (3.4 in) in E. falcata to 22 cm (8.7 in) in E. bleekeri.

== Distribution and habitat ==
Ebosia lionfishes are found in the Indo-Pacific from the eastern coast of Africa between Somalia and South Africa across the Indian Ocean and eastwards into the Pacific Ocean as far as eastern Australia, north to Japan, Korea and China. These fishes are found where there is a sandy or muddy substrates at depths of normally less than 100 m (330 ft).

== Biology ==
Ebosia lionfishes are, like other scorpionfishes, predatory. E. bleekeri is known to feed on small fishes and crustaceans.
