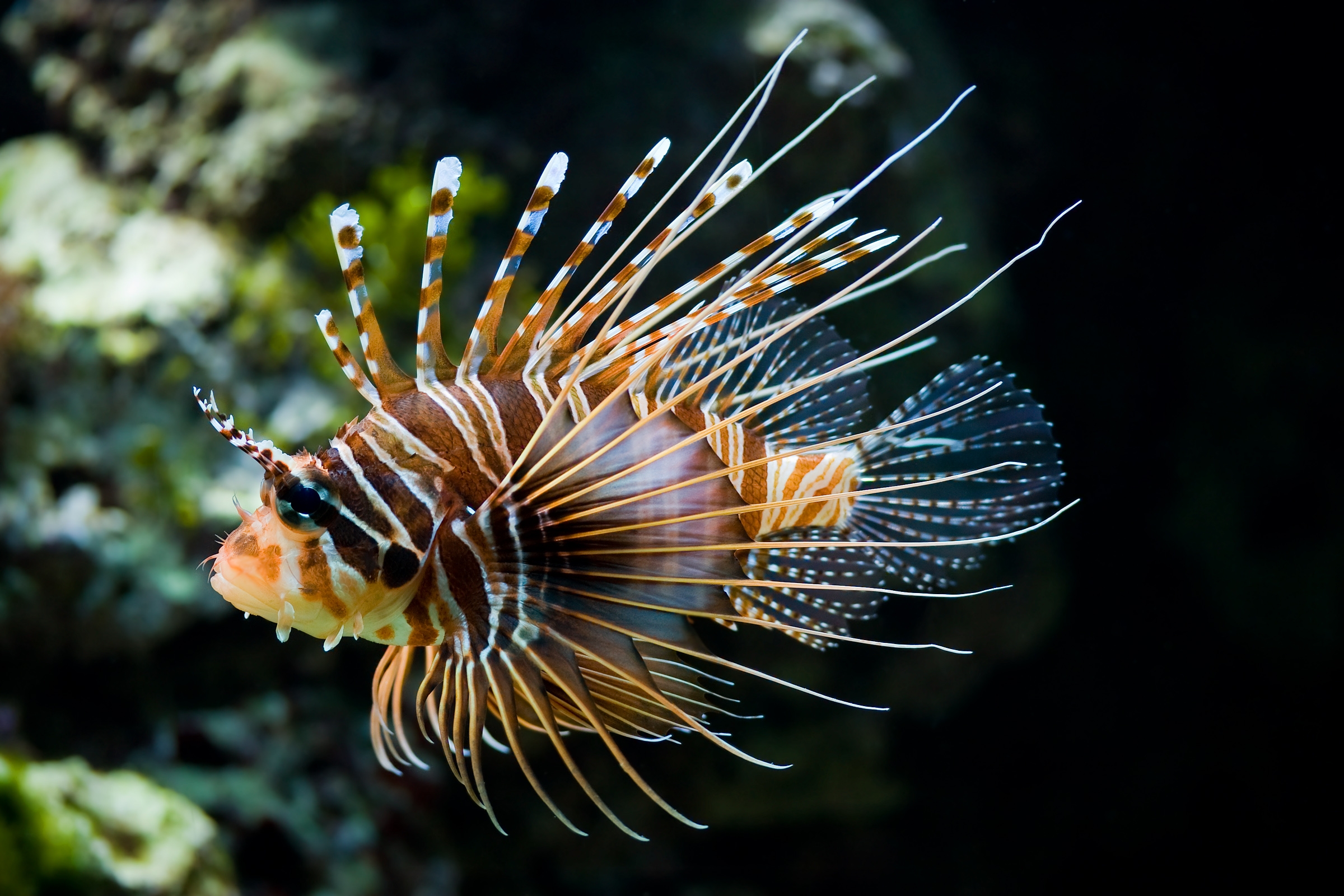
- Schönbrunn Zoo, Austria

Conservation status
- Least Concern (IUCN 3.1)

Scientific classification
- Kingdom: Animalia
- Phylum: Chordata
- Class: Actinopterygii
- Order: Perciformes
- Family: Scorpaenidae
- Genus: Pteropterus
- Species: P. antennatus

Binomial name
- Pteropterus antennatus (Bloch, 1787)

Synonyms
- Scorpaena antennata Bloch, 1787; Pseudomonopterus antennatus (Bloch, 1787); Pteropterus antennata (Bloch, 1787)

= Pterois antennata =

Species of fish

Pteropterus antennatus, the spotfin lionfish, banded lionfish, broadbarred lionfish, broadbarred firefish, raggedfinned firefish, raggedfinned scorpionfish or roughscaled lionfish, is a species of marine ray-finned fish belonging to the family Scorpaenidae, the scorpionfishes and lionfishes. It is found in the tropical Indian and Western Pacific Oceans.

== Taxonomy ==
Pterois antennata was first formally described in 1787 as Scorpaena antennata by German physician and naturalist Marcus Elieser Bloch, with the type locality given as Ambon Island in Indonesia. In 2023, it was reclassified as a species of the revalidated genus Pteropterus.

=== Etymology ===
The specific name antennata means "with antennae", an allusion to the supraorbital tentacles.

== Description ==
Pterois antennata has a laterally compressed rather deep body. There are 13 spines and 11 or 12 soft rays in the dorsal fin and 3 spines and 6 soft rays in its anal fin. There is a long tentacle above each eye. Coronal spines are present and there are many head spines. There are 17 simple fin rays in the pectoral fin. The mouth has many teeth in both upper and lower jaws, these teeth are very small and are arranged in clusters to either side of the mouth with a small patch of the front of the roof of the mouth. This species attains a maximum total length of 20 cm (7.9 in). The overall colour is reddish-brown marked with numerous darker slender to wide vertical bars, these are thin and angled on the caudal peduncle. There is a scattering of dark spots on the anal, dorsal and caudal fins. The head is marked with 3 dark brown bars, one of which is a diagonal bar running through the eye which ends in a large spot on the lower operculum. The long tentacles over each eye are banded and in larger adults there are bluish-black blotches close the pectoral fin bases.

== Distribution and habitat ==
Pterois antennata has a wide Indo-West Pacific distribution, from the Gulf of Aden south to South Africa east to French Polynesia, north as far as southern Japan, and south to Australia and the Kermadec Islands of New Zealand. In Australian waters, its range extends from Fremantle in Western Australia north and east around the tropical northern coasts to at least as far south as Sydney in New South Wales. It is also found at Ashmore Reef in the Timor Sea, the reefs of the Coral Sea, the region of sea around Lord Howe Island, Cocos (Keeling) Islands, and Christmas Island. It is found at depths of between 2 and 86 m (6 ft 7 in and 282 ft 2 in) in lagoon and seaward reefs.

== Biology ==
Pterois antennata is a nocturnal hunter, most active just after nightfall, and spends the day hiding in crevices and caves facing inwards with its venomous spines pointing backwards. It preys mainly on crustaceans and small fishes, including juveniles of its own species, which are approached slowly using undulating fins.

They are normally solitary and protect a home range from other broad-barred lionfishes and other lionfish species. They do form aggregations as juveniles and for breeding. Pterois lionfishes spawn monthly, and the females can lay up to 15,000 eggs in a mass covered in mucus, which the males' sperm can penetrate to fertilise the eggs. The eggs are thought to hatch after 36 hours. Predators of this species include sharks and the cornet fish Fistularia commersonii.

== Use ==
Pterois antennata is caught in some subsistence fisheries, but its small size and venomous spines mean that it is of little interest to commercial fisheries. It is common, though, in the aquarium trade.
