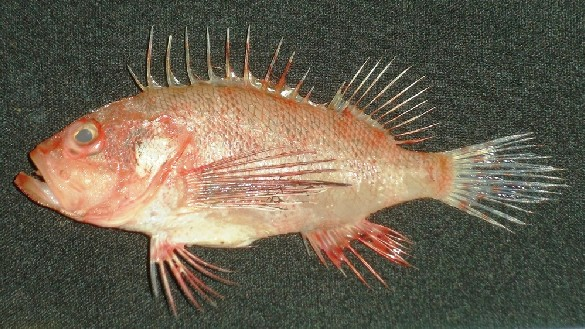

Scientific classification
- Domain: Eukaryota
- Kingdom: Animalia
- Phylum: Chordata
- Class: Actinopterygii
- Order: Perciformes
- Family: Scorpaenidae
- Genus: Brachypterois
- Species: B. serrulata

Binomial name
- Brachypterois serrulata (J. Richardson, 1846)

Synonyms
- Sebastes serrulatus J. Richardson, 1846; Scorpaenodes serrulatus (J. Richardson, 1846)

= Brachypterois serrulata =

Species of fish

Brachypterois serrulata, the sawcheek scorpionfish or pygmy lionfish, is a species of scorpionfish native to the northwestern Pacific Ocean.

== Taxonomy ==
Brachypterois serrulata was first formally described in 1846 as Sebastes serrulatus by the Scottish naval surgeon, Arctic explorer and naturalist John Richardson with the type locality given as off Dong Kang in Picgtung in southern Taiwan. This taxon was widely considered as a senior synonym of Fowler's B. serrulifer. However, a review of the genus published in 2013 and which examined many specimens of Brachypterois from across the wide distribution of the genus concluded that there were 3 valid species within the genus and that Fowler's B. serrilifer was a separate species from Richardson's B. serrulata. The specific name serrulata is a diminutive of the Latin serra which means "saw" and is a reference to the low, slender and serrated crests on the head rather than the rows of spines which the other rockfishes in the genus Sebastes, the genus Richardson placed it in, show.

== Description ==
Brachypterois serrulata has 13 spines and 10 or 11 soft rays in its dorsal fin while the anal fin contains 3 spines and 5 or 6 soft rays. The pectoral fin has between 14 and 16 fin rays, with the mode being 15. The posterior lacrimal spine is normally directed backwards without being curved upward towards its tip. The spines on the corner of outer angular ridge are not well developed and are of similar size to the other spines on the ridge and are pointed downwards. There are often no spines on the middle lateral ridge on the maxilla, sometimed between 1 and 3 spines will be present on larger adult specimens with a standard length in excess of 8 cm (3.1 in).This species attains a maximum total length of 15 cm (5.9 in). The head and body have an overall colour which varies from pinkish to reddish brown, paler on the lower body with a ill-defined black blotch slightly smaller than the diameter of the orbit, on the operculum. The head is marked with 5 bands which are coloured dark red to black with the first of these running from the front margin of the eye over the snout and ending at the tip of the lower jaw. The second band extends from the lower, front edge of the eye onto the lacrimal bone and both jaws, the third runs from just underneath the eye to upper rear corner of the maxilla, the fourth from the lower rear margin of the eye to rear part of the operculum and the fifth runs from the rear margin of the eye to the operculum where it is continuous, to an extent, with the blotch. There are also 5 indistinct vertical, dark bands on the body, the 4th spine being y-shaped and the last being on the caudal peduncle. The background colour of the fins is a similar the pinkish to reddish brown of the head and body. There is a large dark red to black blotch on the spiny part of the dorsal fin with 4 or 5 dark red lines on soft-rayed portion, made up of dots. There are between 6 and 8 similar dotted dark red lines on the anal fin. The pectoral fins are darker towards their tips and have between 6 and 10 thin diagonal narrow dark red bands. There are 6 or 7 thin red to black bands on the pelvic fin. The caudal fin membrane is translucent with a dark red band on the margin, wider in small specimens, and between 60 and 110 small dark red spots on the fin rays. Th eye is bright yellow with a dark blue iris.

== Distribution and habitat ==
Brachypterois serrulata is found in the north western Pacific Ocean from the Gulf of Thailand to southern Japan, including the South China Sea and Taiwan. Occurs in muddy, sheltered habitats in deep or very sheltered estuaries.
