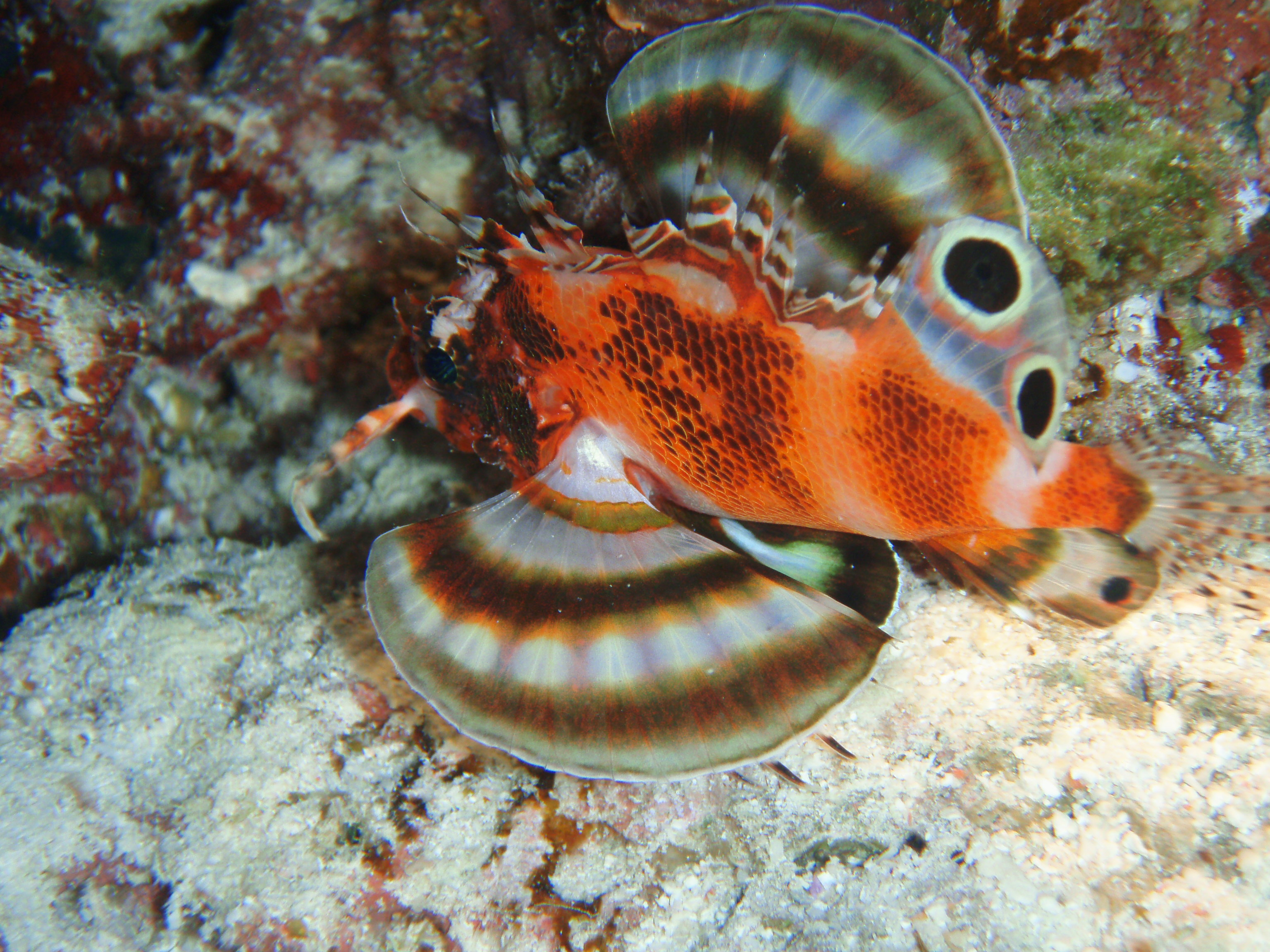

Conservation status
- Least Concern (IUCN 3.1)

Scientific classification
- Kingdom: Animalia
- Phylum: Chordata
- Class: Actinopterygii
- Order: Perciformes
- Family: Scorpaenidae
- Subfamily: Pteroinae
- Genus: Nemapterois
- Species: N. biocellatus

Binomial name
- Nemapterois biocellatus (Fowler, 1938)

Synonyms
- Nemapterois biocellata Fowler, 1938

= Nemapterois biocellatus =

Species of fish

Dendrochirus biocellatus

Nemapterois biocellatus, the Fu Manchu lionfish, twospot turkeyfish, twinspot lionfish, twoeyed lionfish or ocellated lionfish, is a species of marine ray-finned fish belonging to the family Scorpaenidae, the scorpionfishes and lionfishes. This species is widespread throughout the tropical waters of the Indo-West Pacific region, In the wild, the species eats small fish as well as shrimp.

== Taxonomy ==
First formally described as Nemapterois biocellatus in 1938 by the American zoologist Henry Weed Fowler with the type locality given as off Jolo Light on Jolo Island in the Sulu Sea in the Philippines. This is the only species in the monotypic genus Nemapterois. Before 2023, it was considered a species of Dendrochirus, but is now understood to be not particularly closely related to Dendrochirus species.

=== Etymology ===
Nemapterois is a compound of nema, meaning "thread" and Pterois, the genus of "typical" lionfishes. The specific name biocellatus means two spots, alluding to the two eye like spots, called ocelli, on the soft rayed part of the dorsal fin.

== Description ==
Dendrochirus biocellatus has 13 spines and 9 soft rays in its dorsal fin with 3 spines and 5 soft rays in the anal fin, the middle spines in the dorsal fin are shorter than the depth of the body, with deep incisions in the fin membranes of that fin too. The large, wing-like pectoral fins have 20 or 21 fin rays with the upper rays fully connected by membranes, the lower rays being simple and their tips extend beyond the membrane. The tentacles on the lacrimal bone are long, their length being more than two times the diameter of the eye. The overall colour of this lionfish is reddish-brown. there are 2, sometimes 3, large black eye like spots, or ocelli, on the soft-rayed part of the dorsal fin, there are 3 pink to yellowish bars on the flanks. The pectoral fins are banded with pale and brown. This species attains a maximum total length of 13 cm (5.1 in).

== Distribution and habitat ==
Dendrochirus biocellatus has a wide Indo-Pacific distribution which extends from the western Mascarene Islands, The Maldives and Sri Lanka eastwards to the Mariana and Tuamotu Islands, north as far as southern Japan, south to New Caledonia and Tonga. In Australian waters it is found at Scott Reef off Western Australia, at the Ashmore and Hibernia reefs in the Timor Sea and at Christmas Island. This species is found at depths of 1 to 40 m (3 ft 3 in to 131 ft 3 in) in area where there is rich coral growth on reefs in clear water.

== Biology ==
Dendrochirus biocellatus shelters in caves and on ledges during the day, emerging at night to feed on small fishes and small crustaceans. The fin spines are venomous. This species has been observed to have unusual feeding behaviour, as it approaches prey it snaps its dorsal fin spines and shakes its head from side-to-side. This may be designed to distract, or possibly even attract, the prey to the fish. It has also been suggested that the fleshy tentacles on the upper jaw, which give it the name of "Fu-Manchu lionfish" in the aquarium trade, may be used to attract prey to within striking distance. These fish stalk prey by moving stealthily along the substrate or around reef structures, moving forward, either by "hopping" on the pelvic fins or by sinuously waving its caudal fin until it is around half its body length from its quarry, when it makes a rapid lunge and ingests the prey.

== Utilisation ==
Dendrochirus biocellatus appears occasionally in the aquarium trade. They are considered to be moderately difficult to keep in aquaria and not for beginners.
