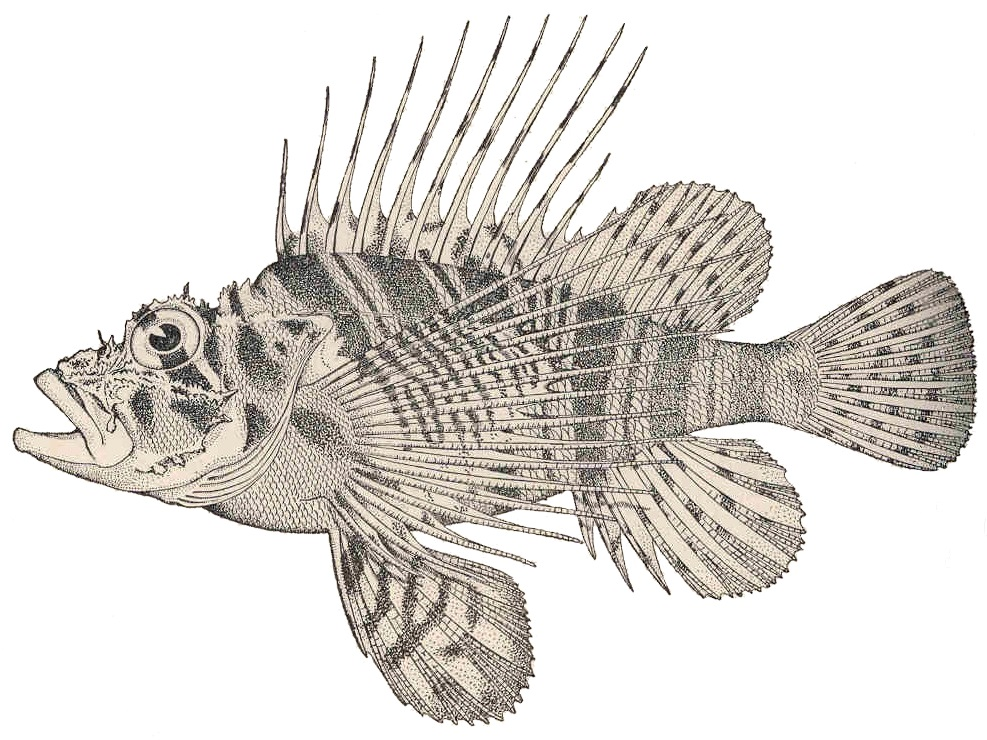

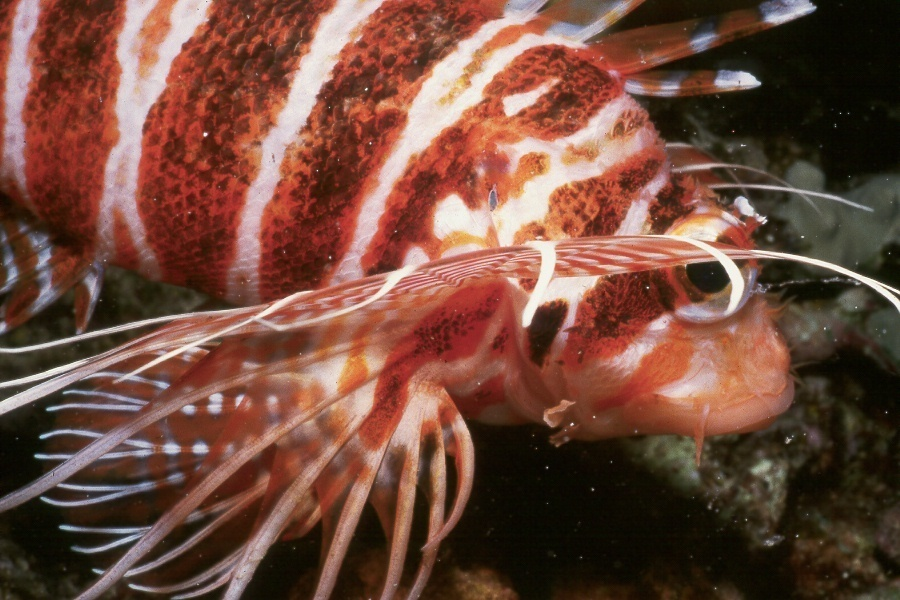

Conservation status
- Least Concern (IUCN 3.1)

Scientific classification
- Kingdom: Animalia
- Phylum: Chordata
- Class: Actinopterygii
- Order: Perciformes
- Family: Scorpaenidae
- Genus: Pteropterus
- Species: P. sphex

Binomial name
- Pteropterus sphex D. S. Jordan & Evermann, 1903

= Pterois sphex =

Species of fish

Pteropterus sphex, the Hawaiian turkeyfish or Hawaiian lionfish is a species of ray-finned fish with venomous spines belonging to the family Scorpaenidae, the scorpionfishes and lionfishes. It is found in the eastern Central Pacific, specifically in marine waters off of Hawaii. It is found in seaward reefs and lagoons at depths from 3 – 122 m.

== Taxonomy ==
Pterois sphex was first formally described in 1903 by the American ichthyologists David Starr Jordan and Barton Warren Evermann with the type locality given as Honolulu on Oahu in Hawaii. In 2023, it was reclassified as a species of the revalidated genus Pteropterus.

=== Etymology ===
The specific name sphex is Greek for "wasp", thought to be an allusion to the sting delivered by the venomous spines of this species.

== Distribution and habitat ==
Pterois sphex is found in the eastern central Pacific where it is endemic to the Hawaiian Islands. It is found at depths between 3 and 122 m (9.8 and 400.3 ft) in lagoon and seaward reefs.

== Description ==
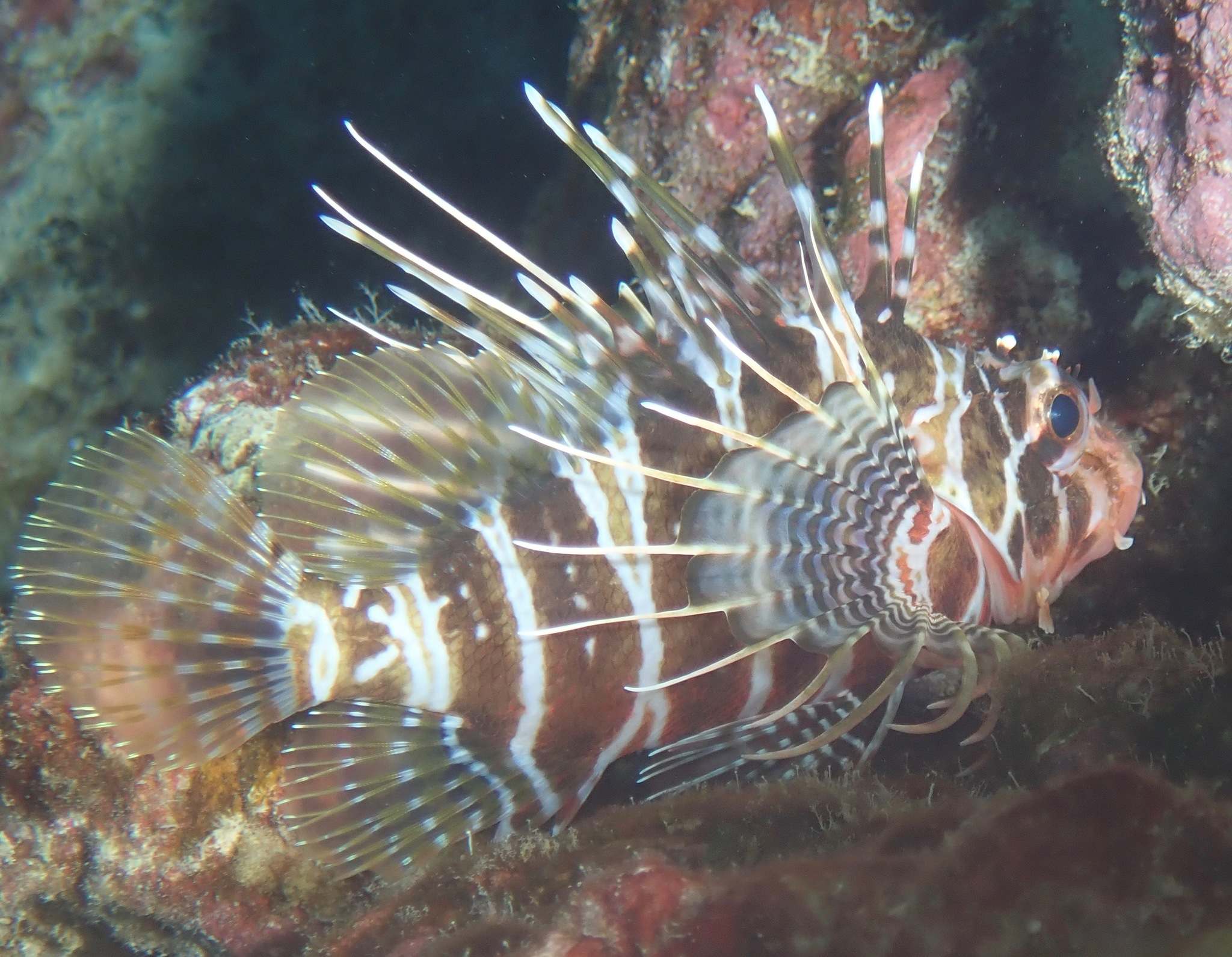
In Hawaii

Pterois sphex has 13 spines and 11 or 12 soft rays in its dorsal fin while the anal fin has 3 spines and between 6 and 8 soft rays. There are between 6 and 8 very long, unbranched fin rays in the pectoral fins which extend beyond the membrane. The spines of the dorsal fin are very long, some are as long as the body is deep. There are coronal spines and most of the head spines multiply as the fish grows. In larger individuals the lachrymal and suborbital bones have a dense covering of spines.

The overall color is brownish pink and white with irregular bright white and brown vertical barring on the flanks. In young fish there are supraorbital tentacles banded with black but these disappear in older fish.

This species attains a maximum total length of 22 cm (8.7 in).

== Biology ==
Pterois sphex spends the day hiding underneath ledges and in caves, emerging at night to feed on smaller fishes and crustaceans. They use their fins to shift the sand or mud on the seabed to reveal any diurnal prey resting in the substrate. They are solitary fishes which only gather for mating, although they have been known to hunt cooperatively too. Despite being solitary they are not thought to defend a home range from other Hawaiian lionfishes.
