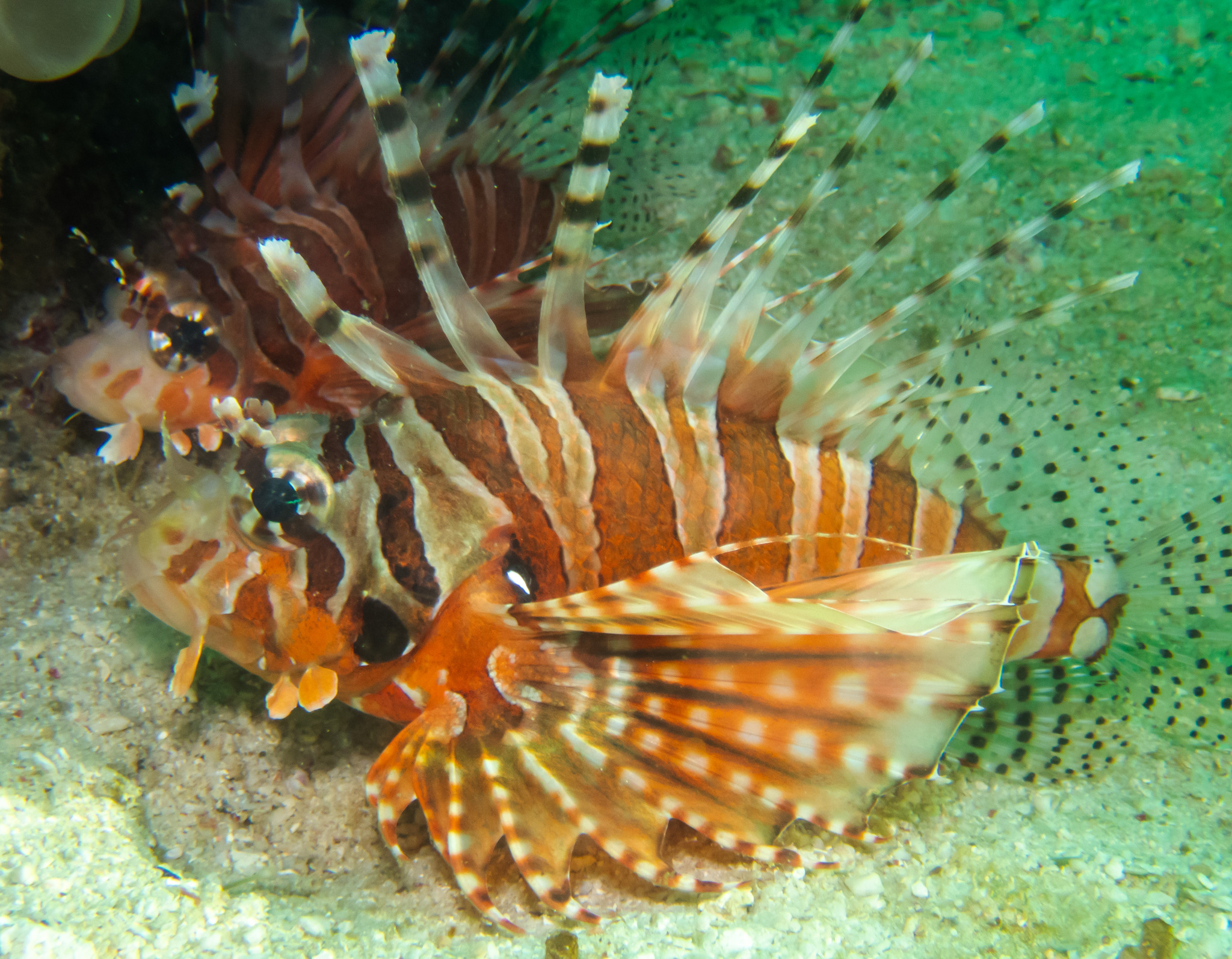
- Zebra turkeyfish (D. zebra)

Scientific classification
- Kingdom: Animalia
- Phylum: Chordata
- Class: Actinopterygii
- Order: Perciformes
- Family: Scorpaenidae
- Subfamily: Pteroinae
- Genus: Dendrochirus; Swainson, 1839

Type species
- Pterois zebra G. Cuvier, 1829

Synonyms
- Brachirus Swainson, 1838; Brachyrus Swainson, 1839; Nemapterois Fowler, 1938

= Dendrochirus =

Genus of fishes

Dendrochirus is a genus of marine ray-finned fishes belonging to the family Scorpaenidae, the scorpionfishes. They are mostly known as turkeyfishes or pygmy lionfishes. They are native to the Indian and Pacific Oceans. They are also popular aquarium fish.

== Taxonomy ==
This genus is classified within the tribe Pteroini of the subfamily Scorpaeninae within the family Scorpaenidae.

=== History ===
Dendrochirus was described as a genus in 1839 by the English naturalist William Swainson. Swainson also named the genera Brachirus and Brachyrus in the same work but in later pages. In 1876 Pieter Bleeker revised the genus and chose Dendrochirus as the name for the genus. In 1882 Joseph Swain designated Pterois zebra, described by Georges Cuvier from Mauritius in 1829, as the type species of Brachyrus which he considered to be a synonym of Pterois.

Some authorities divide the genus into two subgenera, the subgenus Dendrochirus containing all the species except D. biocellatus which is in the monotypic subgenus Nemapterois which was created by Henry Weed Fowler in 1938. This genus and the genus Petrois are closely related and it has been suggested that they form a single genus, Pterois.

In 2023, Dendrochirus was found to be non-monophyletic, so several species were moved to the genera Neochirus and Nemapterois.

=== Etymology ===
The genus name is a compound of dendro, meaning "tree", and cheirus, which means "hand", originally this genus was considered to be a subgenus of Pterois with branched rays in the pectoral fin.

== Species ==
Eight species are recognized in this genus:

Image	Scientific name	Common name	Distribution
	Dendrochirus koyo Matsunuma & Motomura, 2019	Osagawara dwarf lionfish	Japan
	Dendrochirus zebra (G. Cuvier, 1829)	Zebra turkeyfish	Indo-West Pacific, including the Red Sea

== Characteristics ==
Dendrochirus lionfishes are characterised by typically having 13 spines and 9 or 10 soft rays in the dorsal fin and 3 spines and 5 or 6 soft rays in the anal fin. The spines on the parietal bone are not high and the lower jaw has no ridges, spines or scales. There are between 17 and 19 fin rays in the pectoral fins and the middle fin rays are branched. These fishes vary in length from a standard length of 4.5 cm (1.8 in) in the Ogasawara dwarf-lionfish (D. koyo) to 25 cm (9.8 in) in the zebra turkeyfish (D. zebra).

== Distribution and habitat ==
Dendrochirus lionfishes are found in the Indo-Pacific from the Red Sea and the western Indian Ocean to Hawaii and Johnston Atoll.They tend to be associated with hard substrates such as coral rocks and rubble.

== Utilisation ==
Dendrochirus lionfishes are popular species in the aquarium hobby.
