= Creolin =

Generic name for disinfectants

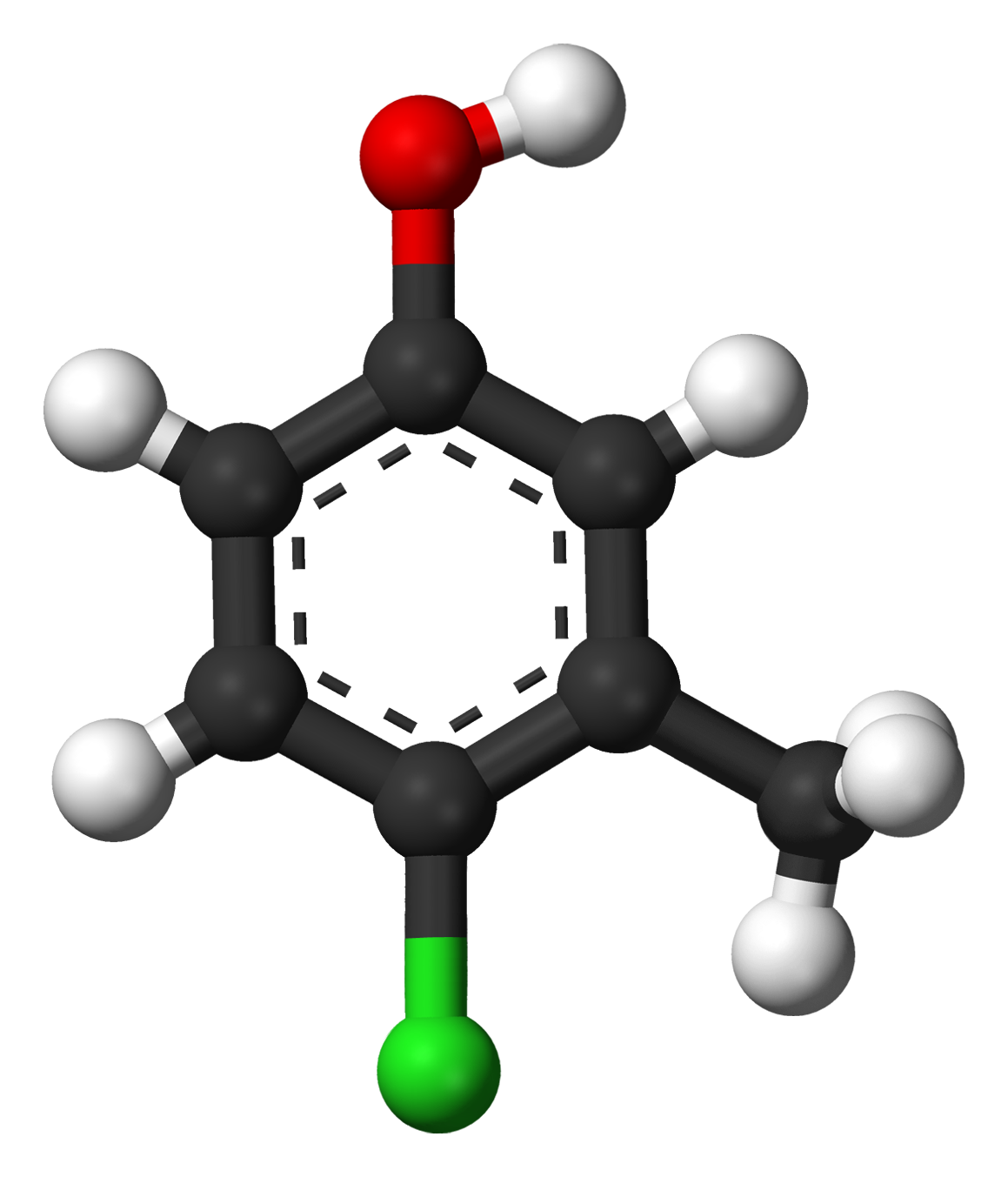

Creolin (which is also called Creolina) is a generic name for disinfectants whose composition varies according to origin. It is extracted from the dry distillation of wood. The residue remaining in the autoclave vessel is a dark, syrupy mass called creosote, which is composed mainly of phenolic acid and cresylic acid. The original composition of creolin is a creosote tar oil, caustic soda, soaps, and very little water. It is of low technology and a very powerful disinfectant.

== History ==
The article on Newland, Kingston upon Hull, mentions that Pearsons was established by William Edward Pearson in 1880. In Italy the company that owns the brand Creolin, Guglielmo Pearson S.r.l. of Genoa Italy, is the only manufacturer of the disinfectant. Internationally, creolin also corresponds to the trade name of other disinfectant products for example by Mark Cansick Co, in addition to the same William Pearson (chemicals).

From 1888 to date Creolin has undergone several changes. The original composition was creosote, caustic soda, soaps, and very little water. Its use was multiple: in the field of medicine (specifically as a hospital grade disinfectant) in the animal husbandry and veterinary sector. In the field of motor restoration works, creolin (and the vapors of the same) is used to return to the original condition of the casting of oil-stained aluminum parts.

By 1888, creolin 1 percent strength was used for the wound dressing of burns.

In 1889, Professor Georges Dujardin-Beaumetz of Paris France published in The Therapeutic Gazette an essay entitled "Prophylactic Hygiene Lecture V.- On Disinfectants":

While extolling the virtues of some new remedies, it will not be amiss to call attention to the drawbacks and disadvantages of another new drug, which of late has become quite popular, viz., creolin. Although the disinfectant properties of creolin have now been definitely proved, the drug has certain disadvantages which contraindicate its use for certain purposes. The solution of creolin is wholly opaque, hence it cannot well be used for the [instrument] basin, in which the instruments are placed before an operation, as it renders their finding difficult. Another disadvantage is that it renders everything with which it comes in contact so soapy that it materially interferes with the firm hold on instruments and parts to be operated upon. That creolin is by no means a harmless agent, but can give rise to serious intoxication, has been amply proved by the publications of Rosin and Cramer.

In 1897, an import agent in Rio de Janeiro was advertising "Creolin-Pearson" as "The best desinfectant for vessels. Recommended for daily use especially during epidemics."

Such was its power as a hospital disinfectant that by 1901, American nurses were urged it use in Methods of Disinfection Recommended by the Department of Health of the City of New York.

In 1915, Parcher's Drug Store was advertising creolin alongside such staples as Pyrox, Lime and Sulphur, Hellebore, Paris Green, Kerso, Blue Vitriol, Arsenate of Lead, Carbonal, Pine Tar, Sheep Dip, Chloride Lime, Rosin, Bi-Sulphide Carbon, Copperas, Washing Fluid, Sulpho Napthol, Sprayers, Cow Ease, Roach Powder, Moth Balls, and Nyals Family Remedies.

In the early 1930s creolin production from peat tar began in Gus-Khrustalny, Vladimir Oblast. From 1942, "due to urgent necessity of disinfectants for the needs of the Eastern Front of WW2", creolin production was expanded to hundreds of tons per annum.

The Plough company acquired the US Creolin Company from Merck & Co. in September 1958.

In 2015, Iranian academics at Mazandaran University performed a Nosocomial infections study on the "Efficiency of some disinfectants (Cidex, Deconex, and Creolin) against E.coli".

== Composition ==
Creolin is a natural disinfectant that is extracted from the dry distillation of wood. This procedure consists of distilling the wood in large autoclaves. From the vapors that emanate from distillation vegetable aguarrás also known as essence of turpentine is extracted. The residue remaining in the autoclave vessel is a dark, syrupy mass called creosote. It is composed mainly of phenol (phenolic acid) and cresol (cresylic acid). It is a very powerful disinfectant, of natural origin, and is used to make different compounds intended for cleaning and disinfection.

The main active ingredient are phenols (26%), coal tar neutral oils (51%), soaps (13%) and water (10%) . The main toxicity of this product is that of phenols, which are non-specific cellular toxins causing damage to the gastrointestinal, hepatic, renal and neurological systems.

Cresylic Acid is a composition of a number of mixtures of several acids that are derived from petroleum and coal tar, boiled above 204 °C, contain varying amounts of cresols and other phenols, and are used in resins, disinfectants, solvents, preservatives, wood preservatives and electrical insulation.

o-Cresol is used as a solvent, disinfectant, and chemical intermediate.

m-Cresol is used to produce certain herbicides, as a precursor to the pyrethroid insecticides, to produce antioxidants, and to manufacture the explosive, 2,4,6-nitro-m-cresol.

p-Cresol is used largely in the formulation of antioxidants and in the fragrance and dye industries.

The EPA has classified o-cresol, m-cresol, and p-cresol as Group C: possible human carcinogens.

=== Exposure ===
Exposure to 26% Creolin disinfectant (26% phenol) produces vomiting, coughing, stridor, tissue sloughing and first degree burns in patients with oral exposure and with dermal exposure. Central nervous system toxicity from exposure to a high concentration phenol containing cleaning product appears to be rapid in onset.

== Mechanism of action ==
For cresol bactericides or disinfectants the mechanism of action is due to the destruction of bacterial cell membranes.

== Uses ==
The ideal concentration for the manufacture of disinfectants is a phenol content of 15% on the product. In this way, when the disinfectant is prepared for use, it will always have a final concentration of phenols higher than 1%, which is used for cleaning and disinfection.

For the preparation of phenol disinfectants, liquid soaps of different types are used which aid in cleaning and, mainly, the solubility of the active substance (phenols or cresols). It has been standard practice to use soaps which, upon dissolving the finished product in water, give a white, milk-like emulsion. This emulsion contains, dissolved in small particles, the active material, whether phenols or cresols.

=== Bactericidal agent ===
Austin Flint II remarked in 1888 that for cases in which Bacillus pyocyanus (Synonym Pseudomonas aeruginosa) was found in patients' wound dressings, and cultivations of it obtained, if gauze impregnated with a creolin lotion containing less than 2 percent could be used for moistening the dressings and the dressings were no longer found to contain the pathogen. Concentrations of creolin higher than 2 percent produced unbearable pain.

Creolin has been shown to be effective in inactivating African swine fever virus.

=== Larvicidal agent: Oral myiasis ===
Treatment of Oral myiasis caused by screwworm larvae consisted of subcutaneous ivermectin therapy and the application of a phenol preparation (10% creolin) as a local measure for the control of larvae. Healing was uneventful in the six cases presented, and no undesirable reactions were observed throughout the period of treatment.

=== Creolin Soap ===
Creolin Soap is not to be confused with Creolin the raw disinfectant which may contain a concentration of "20-26%" toxic phenols. See Exposure.

The active ingredient in Creolin soap is cresylic acid. Creolin Soap is "advertised" as an anti-dandruff, lice treatment, hair root strengthener, hair loss treatment, scalp acne treatment and antibacterial. Unlike the undiluted disinfectant, Creolin soap is formulated for human use.

=== Hair ===
Creolin is also used as a home remedy for lice treatment. Recipes using drops of the concentrated disinfect with "20-26%" toxic phenols mixed with shampoo or mixed with the lather of bar soap can be found online.

There is no scientific evidence that Creolin promotes hair growth.

=== Voodoo ===
Creolin is commonly used as tar water in spiritual cleansing rituals performed by Voodoo, Hoodoo, Santeria and some Afro-American religion practitioners.

== Inappropriate uses ==
These vary greatly by jurisdiction. The 21st century American study of Vearrier et al. listed a number of undesirable uses of creolin, such as: bathing pets, deodorant, or for delousing hair. These can cause harm due to the toxicity of phenol.
