= Exploding ants =

Exploding ants may refer to:

Ants that explode aggressively:

- Colobopsis explodens
- Colobopsis saundersi the Malaysian exploding ant.

Ants that explode due to Ophiocordyceps unilateralis, a fungus or fungus complex.

== See also ==
- Autothysis
- Exploding termites
