= Exploding animal =

Events in which a creature bursts apart

The explosion of animals is an uncommon event arising from natural causes or human activity. Among the best known examples are the post-mortem explosion of whales, as a result of either natural decomposition or deliberate attempts at carcass disposal. Other instances of exploding animals are defensive in nature or the result of human intervention.

== Causes of explosions ==
Natural explosions can occur for a variety of reasons. Post-mortem explosions, like that of a beached whale, are the result of the build-up of natural gases created by methane-producing bacteria inside the carcass during the decomposition process. Natural explosions while an animal is living may be defense-related. A number of toads in Germany and Denmark exploded in April 2005. In 1910, many newspapers carried a story about a duck that allegedly exploded after consuming yeast; Snopes has characterized the account as very improbable, comparing it to urban legends about rice or Alka-Seltzer causing birds to explode.

=== Weaponization ===
Various military attempts have been made to use animals as delivery systems for weapons. In Song dynasty China, oxen carrying large explosive charges were used as self-propelled explosive missiles. During World War II the United States investigated the use of "bat bombs" consisting of bats carrying small incendiary bombs, while at the same time the Soviet Union developed the "anti-tank dog" for use against German tanks. Other attempts have included an Iranian experiment with "kamikaze dolphins", intended to seek out and destroy submarines and enemy warships. There have also been a number of documented incidents of animal-borne bomb attacks, in which donkeys, mules or horses were used to deliver bombs.

== Examples ==
=== Ants ===
Some insects explode altruistically, at the expense of the individual in defense of its colony; the process is called autothysis. Several species of ants, such as Camponotus saundersi in southeast Asia, can explode at will to protect their nests from intruders. C. saundersi, a species of carpenter ant, can self-destruct by autothysis. Two oversized, poison-filled mandibular glands run the entire length of the ant's body. When combat takes a turn for the worse, the ant violently contracts its abdominal muscles to rupture its body and spray poison in all directions. Likewise, many species of termites, such as Globitermes sulphureus, have members, deemed the soldier class, who can split their bodies open emitting a noxious and sticky chemical for the same reason.

=== Cows ===
In January 1932, the Townsville Daily Bulletin, an Australian newspaper, reported an incident where a dairy cow was partially blown up and died on a farm at Kennedy Creek (near Cardwell, North Queensland). The cow had reportedly picked up a blasting cap in her mouth while grazing in a paddock. This was only triggered when the cow began to chew her cud. The resulting explosion blew the cow's head off and knocked the farmer who was milking her at the time unconscious.

=== Rats ===
The explosive rat, also known as the rat bomb, was a weapon developed by the British Special Operations Executive (SOE) in World War II for use against Germany. Rat carcasses were filled with plastic explosives and were to be distributed near German boiler rooms, where it was expected they would be disposed of by burning, with the subsequent explosion having a chance of causing a boiler explosion. The explosive rats never saw use, as the first shipment was intercepted by the Germans; however, the resulting search for more booby-trapped rats consumed enough German resources for the SOE to conclude that the operation was a success.

=== Toads ===
In April 2005, nature protection officials observed toads in the Altona district of Hamburg swelling up with gases and explode, propelling their innards for distances of up to one meter. These incidents prompted local residents to refer to the lake where the toads lived as the Tümpel des Todes, 'Pool of Death'. The incidents were reported as occurring with greatest frequency between 2 and 3 a.m. Werner Smolnik, an environmental movement worker, stated that at least 1,000 toads had died in this manner over the span of a few days. According to Smolnik, the toads expanded to three and a half times their normal size before blowing up. The toads were noted to live a short time after exploding.

Initial theories included a viral or fungal infection, possibly transmitted via drainage from a nearby horse racing track. However, laboratory tests were unable to detect an infectious agent. Berlin veterinarian Franz Mutschmann collected toad corpses and performed necropsies, and hypothesized that the phenomenon was linked to a recent influx of predatory crows to the area. According to his theory, crows attacked the toads and picked out their livers through the skin between their chests and abdominal cavities. The toads enlarged themselves as a defensive mechanism, but due to the hole in their body and their missing liver, their blood vessels and lungs ruptured and expelled their intestines. Mutschmann's theory was dismissed as unlikely by an ornithologist. The official report classified the incident as lacking a satisfactory explanation.

== See also ==
- Animal-borne bomb attacks
- Blast fishing
- Cruelty to animals
- Decline in amphibian populations
- Exploding whale
- Military animals as living bombs
- Raining animals
- Self-destruct
- Spontaneous human combustion
