= M-Cresol =

m-Cresol
- m-cresol

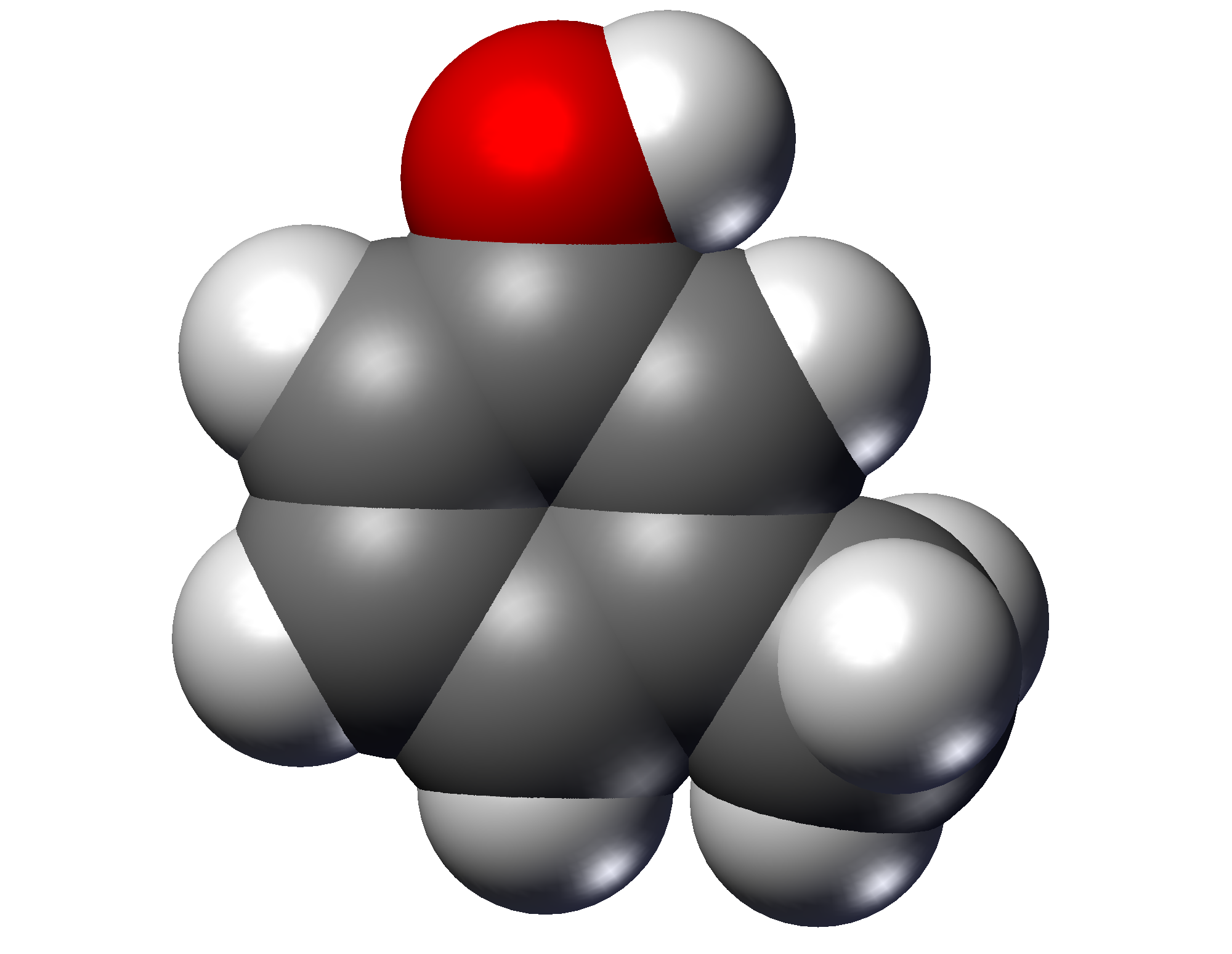
- 3D model of m-cresol

Names
- IUPAC name 3-methylphenol
- Other names 3-Cresol m-Cresol; 3-Hydroxytoluene m-Cresylic acid 1-Hydroxy-3-methylbenzene; 3-Methylbenzenol

Identifiers
CAS Number	108-39-4
3D model (JSmol)	Interactive image
Beilstein Reference	506719
ChEBI	CHEBI:17231
ChEMBL	ChEMBL298312
ChemSpider	21105871
DrugBank	DB01776
ECHA InfoCard	100.003.253
EC Number	203-39-4
Gmelin Reference	101411
KEGG	C01467
PubChem CID	342
RTECS number	GO6125000
UNII	GGO4Y809LO
CompTox Dashboard (EPA)	DTXSID6024200
- InChI: InChI=1S/C7H8O/c1-6-3-2-4-7(8)5-6/h2-5,8H,1H3 Key: RLSSMJSEOOYNOY-UHFFFAOYSA-N; InChI=1/C7H8O/c1-6-3-2-4-7(8)5-6/h2-5,8H,1H3 Key: RLSSMJSEOOYNOY-UHFFFAOYAJ
- SMILES: Cc1cc(O)ccc1

Properties
Chemical formula	C_{7}H_{8}O
Molar mass	108.140 g·mol^{−1}
Appearance	colorless liquid to yellowish liquid
Density	1.034 g/cm^{3}, liquid at 20 °C
Melting point	11 °C (52 °F; 284 K)
Boiling point	202.8 °C (397.0 °F; 475.9 K)
Solubility in water	2.35 g/100 ml at 20 °C; 5.8 g/100 ml at 100 °C
Solubility in ethanol	miscible
Solubility in diethyl ether	miscible
Vapor pressure	0.14 mmHg (20 °C)
Magnetic susceptibility (χ)	−72.02×10^{−6} cm^{3}/mol
Refractive index (n_{D})	1.5398
Viscosity	6.1 cP at 40 °C

Hazards
- Occupational safety and health (OHS/OSH)
Main hazards	May cause serious burns. Very destructive of mucous membranes. Harmful if inhaled. Toxic in contact with the skin or if swallowed.
- GHS labelling
Pictograms	(GHS05: Corrosive) (GHS06: Toxic) (GHS08: Health hazard)
Signal word	Danger
Hazard statements	H227, H301, H311, H314, H351, H370, H372, H373, H401
Precautionary statements	P201, P202, P210, P260, P264, P270, P273, P280, P281, P301+P310, P301+P330+P331, P302+P352, P303+P361+P353, P304+P340, P305+P351+P338, P307+P311, P308+P313, P310, P312, P314, P321, P322, P330, P361, P363, P370+P378, P403+P235, P405, P501
NFPA 704 (fire diamond)	3 2 0
Flash point	86 °C
Explosive limits	1.1%–? (149 °C)
- Lethal dose or concentration (LD, LC)
LD_{50} (median dose)	242 mg/kg (oral, rat, 1969); 2020 mg/kg (oral, rat, 1944); 828 mg/kg (oral, mouse)
- NIOSH (US health exposure limits)
PEL (Permissible)	TWA 5 ppm (22 mg/m^{3}) [skin]
REL (Recommended)	TWA 2.3 ppm (10 mg/m^{3})
IDLH (Immediate danger)	250 ppm
Safety data sheet (SDS)	External MSDS

Related compounds
Related phenols	o-cresol, p-cresol, phenol
- Except where otherwise noted, data are given for materials in their standard state (at 25 °C [77 °F], 100 kPa). verify (what is ?) Infobox references

meta-Cresol, also 3-methylphenol, is an organic compound with the formula CH_{3}C_{6}H_{4}(OH). It is a colourless, viscous liquid that is used as an intermediate in the production of other chemicals. It is a derivative of phenol and is an isomer of p-cresol and o-cresol.

== Production ==
Together with many other compounds, m-cresol is traditionally extracted from coal tar, the volatile materials obtained in the production of coke from (bituminous) coal. This residue contains a few percent by weight of phenol and isomeric cresols. In the cymene–cresol process, toluene is alkylated with propylene to give isomers of cymene, which can be oxidatively dealkylated analogous to the cumene process. Another method, involves carbonylation of a mixture of methallyl chloride and acetylene in the presence of nickel carbonyl.

== Applications ==
m-Cresol is a precursor to numerous compounds. Important applications include:

- pesticides such as fenitrothion and fenthion
- synthetic vitamin E by methylation to give 2,3,6-trimethylphenol
- antiseptics, such as amylmetacresol
- a solvent for polymers. For example, polyaniline is cast from a solution of m-cresol to form a polyaniline film with a superior conductivity than polyaniline alone. This phenomenon is known as secondary doping.
- preservatives in some insulin preparations
- the starting point in the total synthesis of thymol, an important synthetic chemical for regions lacking natural sources of the flavor compound:

C_{7}H_{8}O + C_{3}H_{6} ⇌ C_{10}H_{14}O

- synthesis of dicresulene and policresulen
- synthesis of toliprolol, tolamolol & cresatin

== Natural occurrences ==
m-Cresol is a component found in temporal glands secretions during musth in male African elephants (Loxodonta africana).

m-Cresol is a constituent of tobacco smoke.

m-Cresol is a component found in secretions from the ant Colobopsis saundersi during Autothysis.

== See also ==
- Cresol
