= Globitermes =

Scientific classification
- Kingdom: Animalia
- Phylum: Arthropoda
- Clade: Pancrustacea
- Class: Insecta
- Order: Blattodea
- Infraorder: Isoptera
- Family: Termitidae
- Subfamily: Amitermitinae
- Genus: Globitermes; Holmgren, 1912

Diversity
- 3 species

Genus of termites

Globitermes is a genus of termites endemic to Southeast Asia and mostly inhabit the tropical rain-forests of this region. This genus contains three species which are known for their defensive strategy of autothysis.

== Species ==
- Globitermes brachycerastes Han, 1987 – China (Yunnan)
- Globitermes globosus (Haviland, 1898) – Southeast Asia
- Globitermes sulphureus (Haviland, 1898) – China (Yunnan), Southeast Asia
