= C19H24N2O4 =

The molecular formula C_{19}H_{24}N_{2}O_{4} (molar mass: 344.40 g/mol, exact mass: 344.1736 u) may refer to:

- Arformoterol
- Formoterol
- Tolamolol
