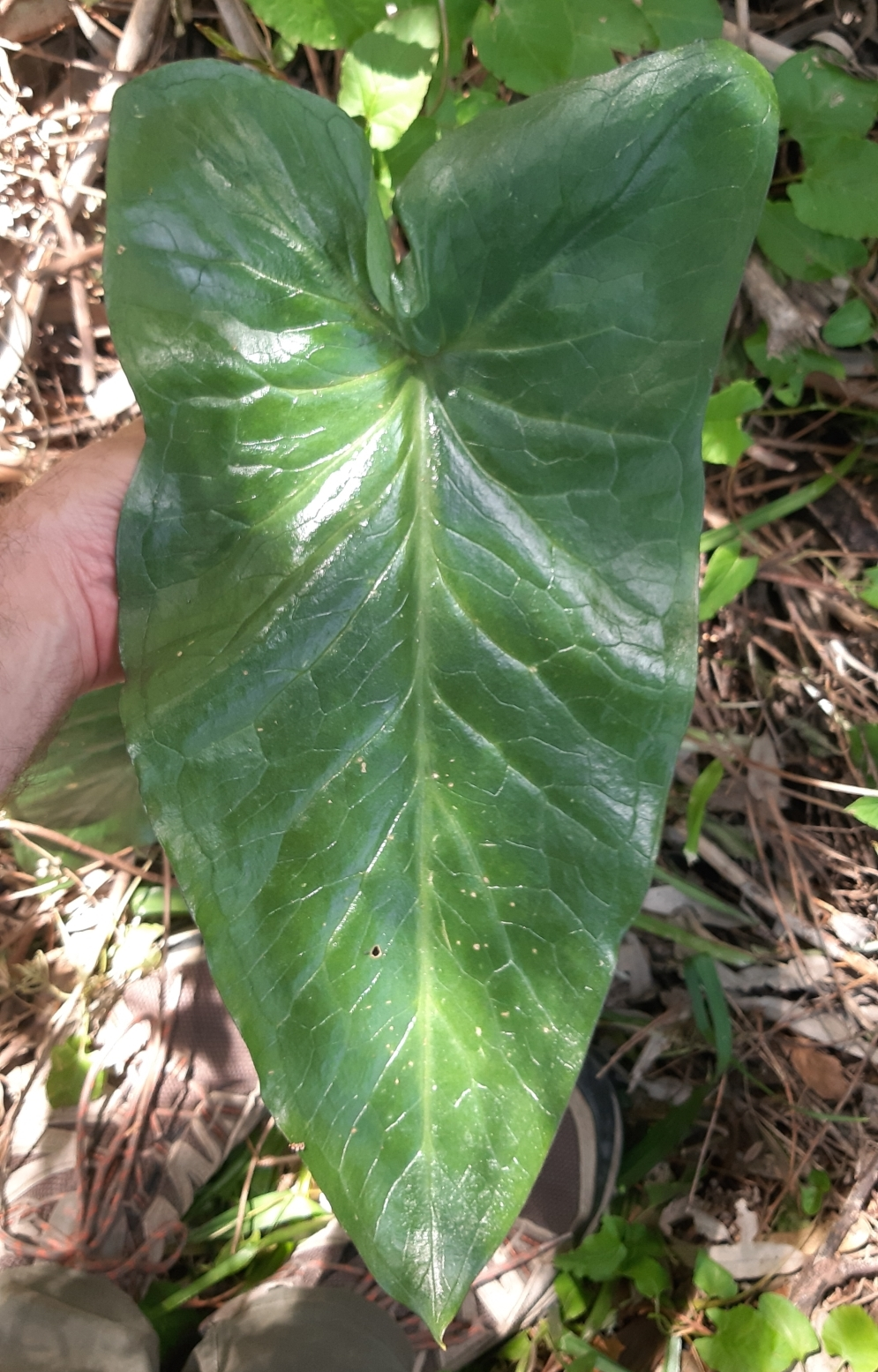

Conservation status
- Vulnerable (IUCN 3.1)

Scientific classification
- Kingdom: Plantae
- Clade: Embryophytes
- Clade: Tracheophytes
- Clade: Angiosperms
- Clade: Monocots
- Order: Alismatales
- Family: Araceae
- Genus: Arum
- Species: A. apulum

Binomial name
- Arum apulum (Carano) P.C.Boyce

Synonyms
- Arum nigrum var. apulum Carano; Arum apulum (Carano) Bedalov

= Arum apulum =

Species of flowering plant

Arum apulum, known as Apulian arum, is a flowering plant species in the family Araceae.

== Description ==
Arum apulum is a tuberous herbs that spreads clonally through discoid vertically oriented tubers. Flowers are borne on a spadix.

Its flowers release a dung scent detectable by pollinators of the Sphaeroceridae and Chironomidae families. The dominant volatile compounds are l-decene, dimethyl-octadiene, and p-cresol.

== Habitat ==
The species is endemic to Italy, where it grows in low scrub at altitudes of 300 to 400 meters (980 to 1,310 ft) in central Apulia. It is threatened by habitat destruction.

== Taxonomy ==
Within the genus Arum, it belongs to subgenus Arum, section Dioscoridea, and subsection Dischroochiton.

A. apulum is tetraploid, with a chromosome count of 2n = 56.

== Bibliography ==
- Gibernau, Marc; Macquart, David; Przetak, Gilles (2004). "Pollination in the genus Arum – a review" (PDF). Aroideana. 27: 148–166. ISSN 0197-4033.
- Kite, Geoffrey C.; et al. (2000). "Inflorescence odours and pollinators of Arum and Amorphophallus (Araceae)" (PDF). Reproductive Biology in Systematics, Conservation and Economic Botany. pp. 295–315. ISBN 1-900347-62-8.
- Boyce, Peter C. (1993-05-14). The Genus Arum. Kew Royal Botanic Gardens. ISBN 0-11-250085-4.
