= Cresol =

Group of chemical compounds

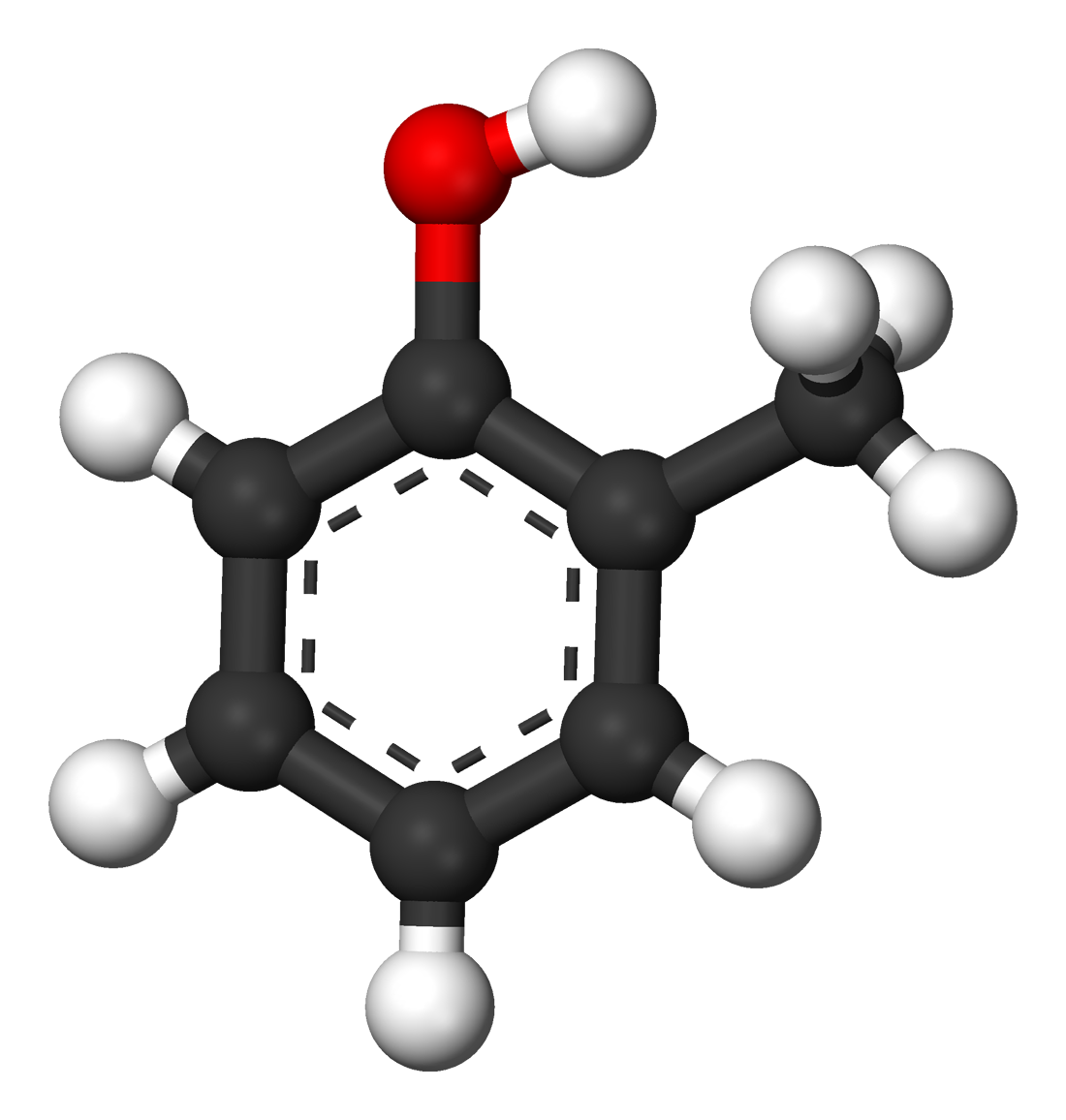
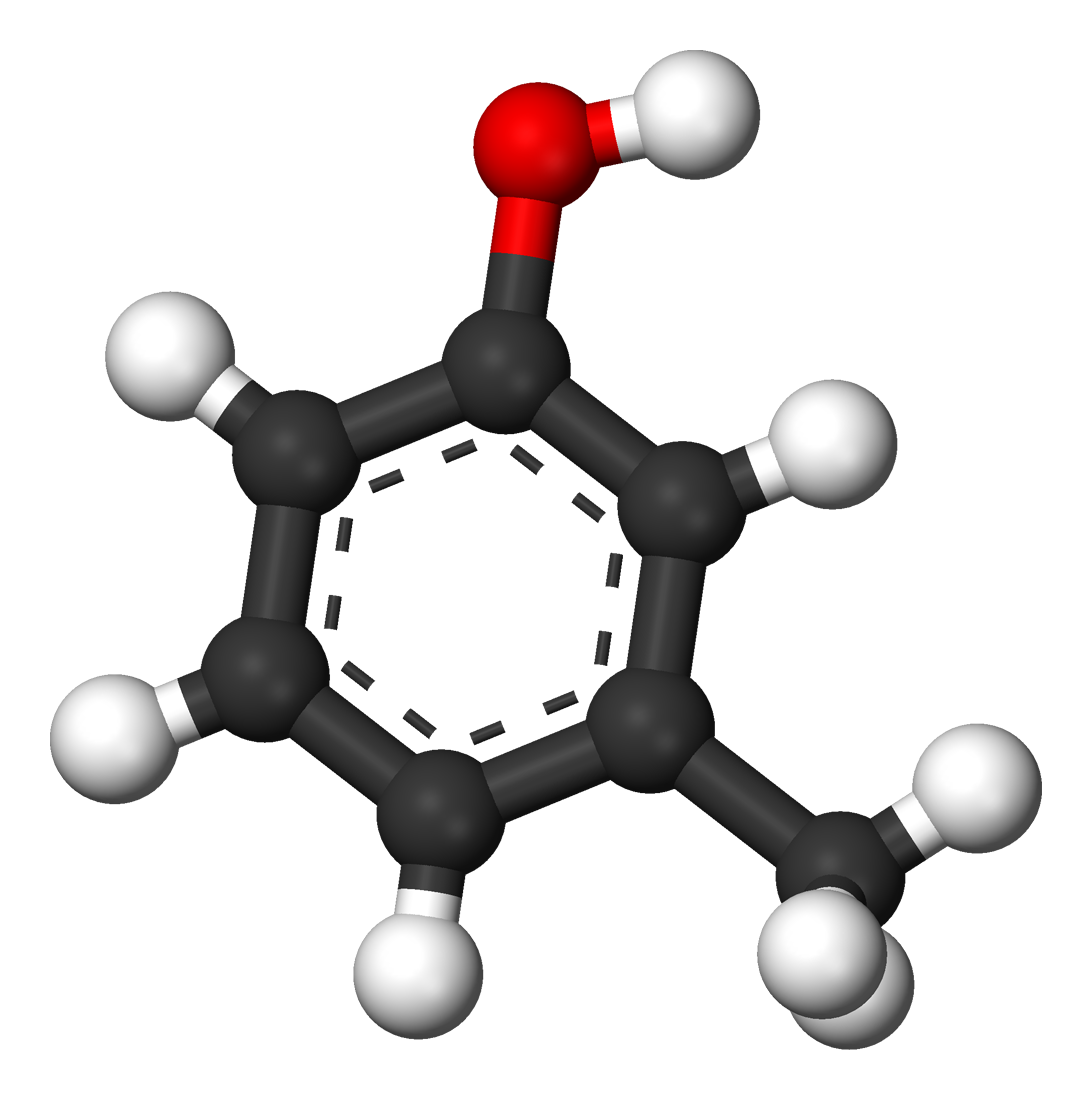
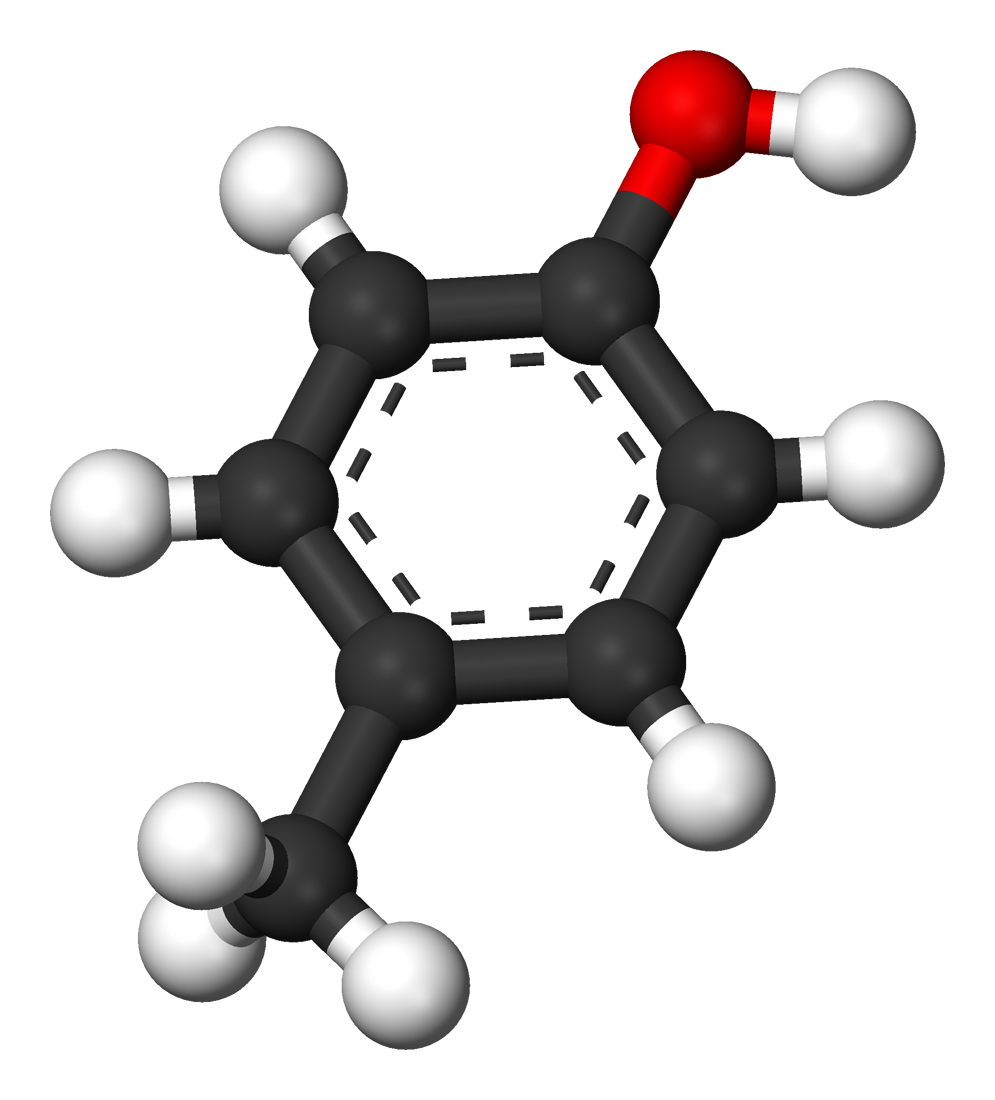
Isomers of Cresol
Skeletal formula
Ball-and-stick model
General
Common name	o-cresol	m-cresol	p-cresol
Preferred IUPAC name	2-methylphenol	3-methylphenol	4-methylphenol
Systematic name	2-methylbenzenol	3-methylbenzenol	4-methylbenzenol
Other names	ortho-cresol 2-hydroxytoluene	meta-cresol 3-hydroxytoluene	para-cresol 4-hydroxytoluene
Molecular formula	C_{7}H_{8}O
SMILES	oc1c(C)cccc1	oc1cc(C)ccc1	oc1ccc(C)cc1
Molar mass	108.14 g/mol
Appearance at room temperature and pressure	colorless crystals	thicker liquid	greasy-looking solid
CAS number	[95-48-7]	[108-39-4]	[106-44-5]	[105-22-1]
CAS number	mixture of cresols (tricresol): [1319-77-3]
Properties
Density and phase	1.05 g/cm^{3}, solid	1.03 g/cm^{3}, liquid	1.02 g/cm^{3}, solid
Solubility in pure water at 20−25 °C	2.5 g/100 ml	2.4 g/100 ml	1.9 g/100 ml
soluble in strongly alkaline water
Melting point	29.8 °C (303.0 K)	11.8 °C (285.0 K)	35.5 °C (309.7 K)
Boiling point	191.0 °C (464.2 K)	202.0 °C (475.2 K)	201.9 °C (475.1 K)
Acidity (pK_{a})	10.287	10.09	10.26
Viscosity	solid at 25 °C	? cP at 25 °C	solid at 25 °C
Structure
Dipole moment	1.35 D	1.61 D	1.58 D
Hazards
SDS
Main hazards	flammable, ingestion and inhalation toxicity hazard
Flash point	81 °C c.c.	86 °C	86 °C c.c.
GHS pictograms	(GHS05: Corrosive) (GHS06: Toxic)
RTECS number	GO6300000	GO6125000	GO6475000
Related compounds
Related phenols	xylenols
Related compounds	bromocresol green, cresol red
Except where noted otherwise, data are given for materials in their standard state (at 25 °C, 100 kPa); Infobox disclaimer and references

Cresols (also known as hydroxytoluene, toluenol, benzol or cresylic acid) are a group of aromatic organic compounds. They are widely-occurring phenols (sometimes called phenolics) which may be either natural or manufactured. They are also categorized as methyl phenols. Cresols commonly occur as either solids or liquids because their melting points are generally close to room temperature. Like other types of phenols, they are slowly oxidized by exposure to air, and the resulting impurities often give the samples a yellow to brownish red tint. Cresols have an odor characteristic to that of other simple phenols, reminiscent to some of a "coal tar" smell. The name "cresol" is an adduct of phenol and their traditional source, creosote.

== Structure and production ==
In its chemical structure, a molecule of cresol has a methyl group substituted onto the ring of phenol. There are three forms (isomers) of cresol: ortho-cresol (o-cresol), meta-cresol (m-cresol), and para-cresol (p-cresol). These forms occur separately or as a mixture, which can also be called cresol or more specifically, tricresol. About half of the world's supply of cresols are extracted from coal tar. The rest is produced by hydrolysis of chlorotoluenes or the related sulfonates. Another method entails methylation of phenol with methanol over a solid acid catalyst, often comprising magnesium oxide or alumina. Temperatures above 300 °C are typical. Anisole converts to cresols under these conditions.

Another isomer of cresol is called Benzyl alcohol, or alpha-cresol (α-cresol). Benzyl alcohol has a hydroxy group inside a methyl group on the benzene ring.

== Applications ==
Cresols are precursors or synthetic intermediates to other compounds and materials, including plastics, pesticides, pharmaceuticals, and dyes.

For cresol bactericides or disinfectants the mechanism of action is due to the destruction of bacterial cell membranes.

Most recently, cresols have been used to create a breakthrough in manufacturing carbon nanotubes at scale that are separated and not twisted, without additional chemicals that change the surface properties of the nanotubes.

=== Commercial examples ===
- Creolin, a 19th-century disinfectant.
- Carbolic soap, 19th-century.
- The original Lysol formulation, essentially a water solution of carbolic soap. "Lysol" has been used as a generic trademark to refer to such a cresol soap solution and remains used as such in some professional settings. The CAS number is 12772-68-8.

=== Derivatives ===
Derivatives of p-cresol include:

- Butylated hydroxytoluene, a common antioxidant

Derivatives of o-cresol include:

- Indo-1, a popular calcium indicator
- MCPA, (4-chloro-2-methylphenoxy)acetic acid
- MCPB, 4-(4-chloro-2-methylphenoxy)butanoic acid
- Mecoprop, (RS)-2-(4-chloro-2-methylphenoxy)propanoic acid
- the amine atomoxetine, (3R)-N-methyl-3-(2-methylphenoxy)-3-phenylpropan-1-amine
- the diol mephenesin, 3-(2-methylphenoxy)propane-1,2-diol

Derivatives of m-cresol include:

- Amylmetacresol, an antiseptic
- Bevantolol, (RS)-[2-(3,4-dimethoxyphenyl)ethyl] [2-hydroxy-3-(3-methylphenoxy)propyl]amine
- Bromocresol green
- Bupranolol, a non-selective beta blocker
- Chloro-m-cresol which is used as a household disinfectant
- Tolimidone, 5-(3-methylphenoxy)pyrimidin-2(1H)-one

== Health effects ==
When cresols are inhaled, ingested, or applied to the skin, they can be very harmful. Effects observed in people include irritation and burning of skin, eyes, mouth, and throat; abdominal pain and vomiting; heart damage; anemia; liver and kidney damage; facial paralysis; coma; and death.

Breathing high levels of cresols for a short time results in irritation of the nose and throat. Aside from these effects, very little is known about the effects of breathing cresols, for example, at lower levels over longer times.

Ingesting high levels results in kidney problems, mouth and throat burns, abdominal pain, vomiting, and effects on the blood and nervous system.

Skin contact with high levels of cresols can burn the skin and damage the kidneys, liver, blood, brain, and lungs.

Short-term and long-term studies with animals have shown similar effects from exposure to cresols. No human or animal studies have shown harmful effects from cresols on reproduction.

It is not known what the effects are from long-term ingestion or skin contact with low levels of cresols.

The Occupational Safety and Health Administration has set a permissible exposure limit at 5 ppm (22 mg/m^{3}) over an eight-hour time-weighted average, while the National Institute for Occupational Safety and Health recommends a limit of 2.3 ppm (10 mg/m^{3}).

== See also ==
- Dihydroxytoluene
- Trihydroxytoluene
