= 3-Methylcatechol =

Names
- Preferred IUPAC name 3-Methylbenzene-1,2-diol
- Other names 2,3-Dihydroxytoluene; 3-Methylpyrocatechol

Identifiers
CAS Number	488-17-5
3D model (JSmol)	Interactive image
ChEBI	CHEBI:18404
ChemSpider	333
ECHA InfoCard	100.006.975
PubChem CID	340
UNII	0HUZ4Q9R8C
CompTox Dashboard (EPA)	DTXSID9060071
- InChI: InChI=1S/C7H8O2/c1-5-3-2-4-6(8)7(5)9/h2-4,8-9H,1H3 Key: PGSWEKYNAOWQDF-UHFFFAOYSA-N
- SMILES: CC1=C(C(=CC=C1)O)O

Properties
Chemical formula	C_{7}H_{8}O_{2}
Molar mass	124.139 g·mol^{−1}
Appearance	white solid
Density	g/cm^{3}
Melting point	68 °C (154 °F; 341 K)
Boiling point	241 °C (466 °F; 514 K)
- Except where otherwise noted, data are given for materials in their standard state (at 25 °C [77 °F], 100 kPa). Infobox references

3-Methylcatechol is an organic compound with the formula CH_{3}C_{6}H_{3}(OH)_{2} A white solid, it is one of the isomers of methylbenzenediol. Being structurally related to lignans, it contributes to the aerosols generated by combustion of wood.

== Metabolism ==
The enzyme 1,2-dihydroxy-6-methylcyclohexa-3,5-dienecarboxylate dehydrogenase uses 1,2-dihydroxy-6-methylcyclohexa-3,5-dienecarboxylate and NAD^{+} to produce 3-methylcatechol, NADH and CO_{2}.

The isofunctional enzymes of catechol 1,2-dioxygenase from species of Acinetobacter, Pseudomonas, Nocardia, Alcaligenes and Corynebacterium oxidize 3-methylcatechol according to both the intradiol and extradiol cleavage patterns. However, the enzyme preparations from Brevibacterium and Arthrobacter have only the intradiol cleavage activity.

== Related compounds ==
The 3-methylcatechol structural motif is rare in natural products. Known examples include calopin and a δ-lactone derivative, O-acetylcyclocalopin A|O-acetylcyclocalopin A, which have been isolated from the fungus Caloboletus calopus.

== Uses ==
There is apparently an isomer of watermelon ketone that can be made from 3-methylcatechol called Conoline.
