= Trihydroxytoluene =

Trihydroxytoluene may refer to:

- 2,3,4-trihydroxytoluene (caricaphenyl triol) of the papaya plant
- 2,3,5-trihydroxytoluene, a product of orcinol catalysis
- 2,4,6-trihydroxytoluene (2-Methylphloroglucinol)
- 3,4,5-Trihydroxytoluene (5-Methylpyrogallol)
- Trihydroxytoluene (phenylmethanetriol)
- α,α,α-trimethoxytoluene (Trimethyl orthobeznoate)

== See also ==
- Hydroxytoluene
- Dihydroxytoluene
- Trinitrotoluene
