= Cis-1,2-dihydroxy-4-methylcyclohexa-3,5-diene-1-carboxylate dehydrogenase =

Class of enzymes

cis-1,2-dihydroxy-4-methylcyclohexa-3,5-diene-1-carboxylate dehydrogenase

Identifiers
- EC no.: 1.3.1.67

Databases
- IntEnz: IntEnz view
- BRENDA: BRENDA entry
- ExPASy: NiceZyme view
- KEGG: KEGG entry
- MetaCyc: metabolic pathway
- PRIAM: profile
- PDB structures: RCSB PDB PDBe PDBsum
- Gene Ontology: AmiGO / QuickGO
Search
- PMC: articles
- PubMed: articles
- NCBI: proteins

In enzymology, a cis-1,2-dihydroxy-4-methylcyclohexa-3,5-diene-1-carboxylate dehydrogenase (EC 1.3.1.67) is an enzyme that catalyzes the chemical reaction

cis-1,2-dihydroxy-4-methylcyclohexa-3,5-diene-1-carboxylate + NAD(P)+ $\rightleftharpoons$ 4-methylcatechol + NAD(P)H + CO_{2}

The 3 substrates of this enzyme are cis-1,2-dihydroxy-4-methylcyclohexa-3,5-diene-1-carboxylate, NAD^{+}, and NADP^{+}, whereas its 4 products are 4-methylcatechol, NADH, NADPH, and CO_{2}.

This enzyme belongs to the family of oxidoreductases, specifically those acting on the CH-CH group of donor with NAD+ or NADP+ as acceptor. The systematic name of this enzyme class is cis-1,2-dihydroxy-4-methylcyclohexa-3,5-diene-1-carboxylate:NAD(P)+ oxidoreductase (decarboxylating). This enzyme participates in toluene and xylene degradation.
