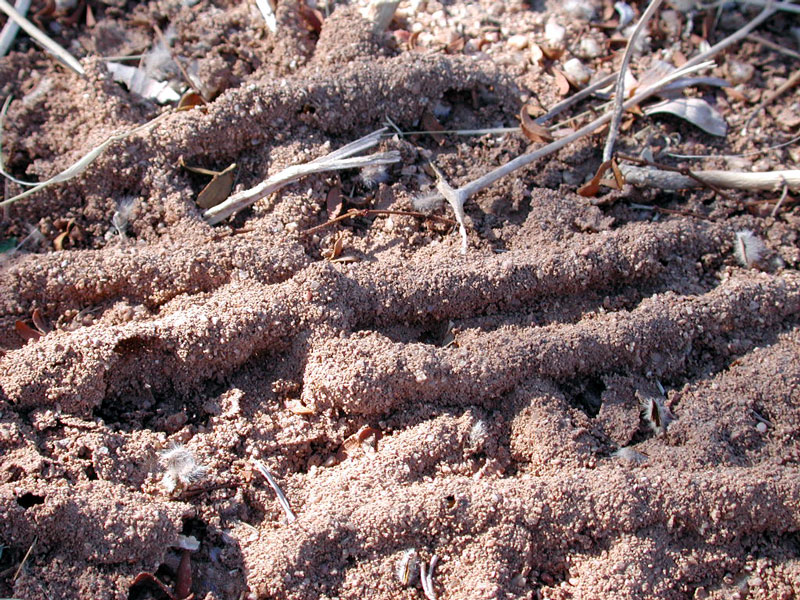
- Dry twigs covered with soil by feeding activities of encrusting termites, Gnathamitermis perplexus in the Sonoran Desert, Arizona

Scientific classification
- Kingdom: Animalia
- Phylum: Arthropoda
- Clade: Pancrustacea
- Class: Insecta
- Order: Blattodea
- Infraorder: Isoptera
- Family: Termitidae
- Subfamily: Amitermitinae; Kemner, 1934

Genera
- Ahamitermes; Amitermes; Dentispicotermes; Drepanotermes; Eremotermes; Globitermes; Gnathamitermes; Hoplotermes; Incolitermes; Invasitermes; Orthognathotermes; Prohamitermes; Pseudhamitermes; Synhamitermes

= Amitermitinae =

Amitermitinae Temporal range: Late Triassic–Recent

Subfamily of termites

Amitermitinae is a diverse subfamily of termites in the family Termitidae. The subfamily was revived as a valid taxon by Hellemans et al., 2024, and is represented by 14 genera and 194 species. The subfamily is cosmopolitan, occurring across every tropical biogeographic realm. Species have diverse feeding strategies, with some feeding on the substrate found in mounds and soil, while others feed on grasses and wood through soil-wood interface feeding.
