= Drepanotermes =

Scientific classification
- Kingdom: Animalia
- Phylum: Arthropoda
- Clade: Pancrustacea
- Class: Insecta
- Order: Blattodea
- Infraorder: Isoptera
- Family: Termitidae
- Subfamily: Amitermitinae
- Genus: Drepanotermes; Silvestri, 1909

Genus of harvester termites

Drepanotermes is a genus of harvester termites in the subfamily Amitermitinae. It was first described by F. Silvestri in 1909, based on specimens collected during the Hamburg Southwest Australian Expedition.

Species of Drepanotermes are endemic to arid regions of Australia.

== Phylogeny ==
Historically, Drepanotermes was placed within the subfamily Termitinae. Recent genomic studies have reassigned the genus to the subfamily Amitermitinae based on molecular evidence.

== Ecology ==
Drepanotermes species construct mounds or subterranean nests that are connected to the surface by covered soil trails used for foraging. Colonies collect dry plant material, primarily grasses and leaves, which is transported along these trails and stored in underground chambers for later consumption. Foraging activity often creates characteristic bare zones in the surrounding vegetation. Depending on the species, nests may be entirely subterranean or include small, surface soil mounds.
