= 4-Methylcatechol =

Names
- Preferred IUPAC name 4-Methylbenzene-1,2-diol
- Other names 4-Methyl-1,2-dihydroxybenzene; 3,4-Dihydroxytoluene; Homocatechol; 4-Methyl-1,2-benzenediol; Homopyrocatechol p-Methylcatechol

Identifiers
CAS Number	452-86-8
3D model (JSmol)	Interactive image
ChEBI	CHEBI:17254
ChEMBL	ChEMBL158766
ChemSpider	9564
DrugBank	DB04120
ECHA InfoCard	100.006.559
EC Number	207-214-5
KEGG	C06730
PubChem CID	9958
UNII	12GLI7JGB3
CompTox Dashboard (EPA)	DTXSID5020861
- InChI: InChI=1S/C7H8O2/c1-5-2-3-6(8)7(9)4-5/h2-4,8-9H,1H3 Key: ZBCATMYQYDCTIZ-UHFFFAOYSA-N
- SMILES: CC1=CC(=C(C=C1)O)O

Properties
Chemical formula	C_{7}H_{8}O_{2}
Molar mass	124.139 g·mol^{−1}

Hazards
- GHS labelling
Pictograms	(GHS07: Exclamation mark)
Signal word	Warning
Hazard statements	H302, H312, H315, H319, H335
Precautionary statements	P261, P264, P264+P265, P270, P271, P280, P301+P317, P302+P352, P304+P340, P305+P351+P338, P317, P319, P321, P330, P332+P317, P337+P317, P362+P364, P403+P233, P405, P501
- Except where otherwise noted, data are given for materials in their standard state (at 25 °C [77 °F], 100 kPa). Infobox references

4-Methylcatechol is an organic compound with the formula CH_{3}C_{6}H_{3}(OH)_{2} A white solid, it is one of the isomers of methylbenzenediol.

== Metabolism ==
The enzyme cis-1,2-dihydroxy-4-methylcyclohexa-3,5-diene-1-carboxylate dehydrogenase uses cis-1,2-dihydroxy-4-methylcyclohexa-3,5-diene-1-carboxylate and NAD(P)^{+} to produce 4-methylcatechol, NADH, NADPH and CO_{2}.

== Related compounds ==
Members of the monocot subfamily Amaryllidoideae present a unique type of alkaloids, the norbelladine alkaloids, which are 4-methylcatechol derivatives combined with tyrosine. They are responsible for the poisonous properties of a number of the species. Over 200 different chemical structures of these compounds are known, of which 79 or more are known from Narcissus alone.

== Production and occurrence ==
Calone, a derivative of 4-methylcatechol, is known in the fragrance industry as "watermelon ketone" for its distinctive odor.

The brand of low-temperature coke used as a smokeless fuel Coalite obtains homocatechol from ammoniacal liquor by solvent extraction, distillation and crystallisation.

Being structurally related to lignans, it is contributes to the aerosol generate by combustion of wood.

It is a component of castoreum, the exudate from the castor sacs of the mature beaver.

== See also ==
- Dihydroxytoluene
