= Methylbenzenediol =

Methylbenzenediol, also known as dihydroxytoluene, may refer to:

- 3-Methylcatechol (3-methylbenzene-1,2-diol or 2,3-dihydroxytoluene)
- 4-Methylcatechol (4-methylbenzene-1,2-diol or 3,4-dihydroxytoluene)
- 2-methylbenzene-1,3-diol
- 4-methylbenzene-1,3-diol
- Orcinol (5-methylbenzene-1,3-diol or 3,5-dihydroxytoluene)
- 2-methylbenzene-1,4-diol

== See also ==
- Cresol (methylphenol, hydroxytoluene)
- Trihydroxytoluene
