= 1,2-dihydroxy-6-methylcyclohexa-3,5-dienecarboxylate dehydrogenase =

Class of enzymes

Identifiers
- EC no.: 1.3.1.68

Databases
- IntEnz: IntEnz view
- BRENDA: BRENDA entry
- ExPASy: NiceZyme view
- KEGG: KEGG entry
- MetaCyc: metabolic pathway
- PRIAM: profile
- PDB structures: RCSB PDB PDBe PDBsum
- Gene Ontology: AmiGO / QuickGO
Search
- PMC: articles
- PubMed: articles
- NCBI: proteins

In enzymology, a 1,2-dihydroxy-6-methylcyclohexa-3,5-dienecarboxylate dehydrogenase (EC 1.3.1.68) is an enzyme that catalyzes the chemical reaction

1,2-dihydroxy-6-methylcyclohexa-3,5-dienecarboxylate + NAD^{+} $\rightleftharpoons$ 3-methylcatechol + NADH + CO_{2}

Thus, the two substrates of this enzyme are 1,2-dihydroxy-6-methylcyclohexa-3,5-dienecarboxylate and NAD^{+}, whereas its 3 products are 3-methylcatechol, NADH, and CO_{2}.

This enzyme belongs to the family of oxidoreductases, specifically those acting on the CH-CH group of donor with NAD+ or NADP+ as acceptor. The systematic name of this enzyme class is 1,2-dihydroxy-6-methylcyclohexa-3,5-dienecarboxylate:NAD+ oxidoreductase (decarboxylating). This enzyme participates in toluene and xylene degradation.
