= O-Cresol =

o-Cresol
Kekulé, skeletal formula of o-cresol with some implicit hydrogens shown
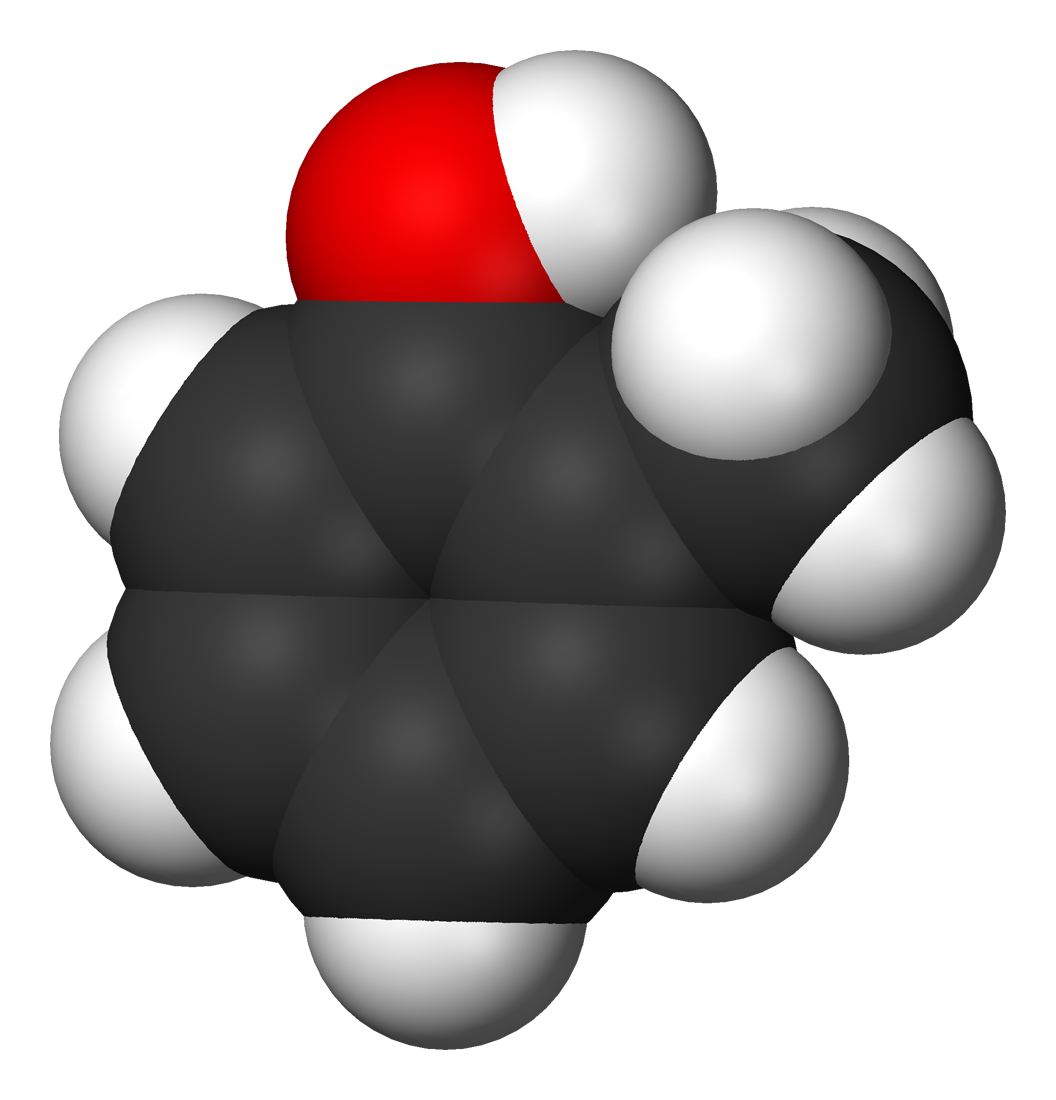
Spacefill model of o-cresol

Names
- Preferred IUPAC name 2-Methylphenol
- Systematic IUPAC name 2-Methylbenzenol
- Other names 2-Cresol o-Cresol ortho-Cresol ortho-Toluenol ortho-Benzol; 2-Hydroxytoluene o-Cresylic acid 1-Hydroxy-2-methylbenzene

Identifiers
CAS Number	95-48-7
3D model (JSmol)	Interactive image
Beilstein Reference	506917
ChEBI	CHEBI:28054
ChEMBL	ChEMBL46931
ChemSpider	13835772
ECHA InfoCard	100.002.204
EC Number	202-423-8
Gmelin Reference	101619
KEGG	C01542
MeSH	2-Cresol
PubChem CID	335
RTECS number	GO6300000
UNII	YW84DH5I7U
UN number	2076, 3455
CompTox Dashboard (EPA)	DTXSID8021808
- InChI: InChI=1S/C7H8O/c1-6-4-2-3-5-7(6)8/h2-5,8H,1H3 Key: QWVGKYWNOKOFNN-UHFFFAOYSA-N
- SMILES: Cc1ccccc1O

Properties
Chemical formula	C_{7}H_{8}O
Molar mass	108.140 g·mol^{−1}
Appearance	Colorless to white crystals
Odor	sweet, phenolic odor
Density	1.0465 g cm^{−3}
Melting point	31 °C; 88 °F; 304 K
Boiling point	191 °C; 376 °F; 464 K
Solubility in water	31 g dm^{−3} (at 40 °C)
Solubility	soluble in chloroform, ether, CCl_{4}
Solubility in ethanol	Miscible (at 30 °C)
Solubility in diethyl ether	Miscible (at 30 °C)
log P	1.962
Vapor pressure	40 Pa (at 20 °C)
Acidity (pK_{a})	10.316
Basicity (pK_{b})	3.681
Magnetic susceptibility (χ)	−72.9×10^{−6} cm^{3}/mol
Refractive index (n_{D})	1.5353
Viscosity	35.06 cP (at 45 °C)

Thermochemistry
Heat capacity (C)	154.56 J K^{−1} mol^{−1}
Std molar entropy (S^{⦵}_{298})	165.44 J K^{−1} mol^{−1}
Std enthalpy of formation (Δ_{f}H^{⦵}_{298})	−204.3 kJ mol^{−1}
Std enthalpy of combustion (Δ_{c}H^{⦵}_{298})	−3.6936 MJ mol^{−1}

Hazards
- GHS labelling
Pictograms	(GHS05: Corrosive) (GHS06: Toxic)
Signal word	Danger
Hazard statements	H301, H311, H314
Precautionary statements	P260, P264, P270, P280, P301+P310, P301+P330+P331, P302+P352, P303+P361+P353, P304+P340, P305+P351+P338, P310, P312, P321, P322, P330, P361, P363, P405, P501
NFPA 704 (fire diamond)	3 2 0
Flash point	81 °C (178 °F; 354 K)
Autoignition temperature	598.9 °C (1,110.0 °F; 872.0 K)
Explosive limits	1.4%–? (148 °C)
- Lethal dose or concentration (LD, LC)
LD_{50} (median dose)	1350 mg/kg (rat, oral); 121 mg/kg (rat, oral); 344 mg/kg (mouse, oral)
- NIOSH (US health exposure limits)
PEL (Permissible)	TWA 5 ppm (22 mg/m^{3}) [skin]
REL (Recommended)	TWA 2.3 ppm (10 mg/m^{3})
IDLH (Immediate danger)	250 ppm
Safety data sheet (SDS)	External MSDS

Related compounds
Related phenols	Cresols: m-cresol; p-cresol benzyl alcohol, phenol
- Except where otherwise noted, data are given for materials in their standard state (at 25 °C [77 °F], 100 kPa). verify (what is ?) Infobox references

ortho-Cresol (IUPAC name: 2-methylphenol, also known as 2-hydroxytoluene or ortho-toluenol) is an organic compound with the formula CH_{3}C_{6}H_{4}(OH). It is a colourless solid that is widely used intermediate in the production of other chemicals. It is a derivative of phenol and is an isomer of p-cresol and m-cresol.

== Natural occurrences ==
o-Cresol is one of the chemical compounds found in castoreum. This compound is gathered from the beaver's castor glands and found in the white cedar consumed by the beaver.

o-Cresol is a constituent of tobacco smoke.

== Production ==
Together with many other compounds, o-cresol is traditionally extracted from coal tar, the volatile materials obtained in the production of coke from coal. A similar source material is petroleum residues. These residue contains a few percent by weight of phenol and isomeric cresols. In addition to the materials derived from these natural sources, about two thirds of the Western world's supply is produced by methylation of phenol using methanol. The alkylation is catalysed by metal oxides:

C_{6}H_{5}OH + CH_{3}OH → CH_{3}C_{6}H_{4}OH + H_{2}O

Over-methylation gives xylenol. Many other production methods have been examined, including oxidative decarboxylation of salicylic acid, oxygenation of toluene, and hydrolysis of 2-chlorotoluene.

== Applications ==
o-Cresol is mainly used as a precursor to other compounds. Chlorination and etherification gives members of commercially important herbicides, such as 2-methyl-4-chlorophenoxyacetic acid (MCPA). Nitration gives dinitrocresol, a popular herbicide. Kolbe–Schmitt carboxylation gives o-cresotinic acid, a pharmaceutical intermediate. Carvacrol, essence of oregano, is derived by alkylation of o-cresol with propene. The muscle relaxant mephenesin is an ether derived from o-cresol.

o-Cresol can be employed in the production of coumarin in a process known as the Raschig method. Salicylaldehyde itself is made from o-Cresol using this peculiar method of synthesis. Other compounds made from o-Cresol include Bevantolol, and an agent called HIPDM [84718-97-8]. Additional examples include primidolol, Nitromersol [133-58-4].

== Health effects ==
Most exposures to cresols are at very low levels that are not harmful although, like phenols, cresols are skin irritants. When cresols are inhaled, ingested, or applied to the skin at very high levels, they can be harmful. Breathing high levels of cresols for a short time results in irritation of the nose and throat. Aside from these effects, very little is known about the effects of breathing cresols at lower levels over longer times. The acute LD_{50} for oral ingestion by mice is 344 mg/kg.
