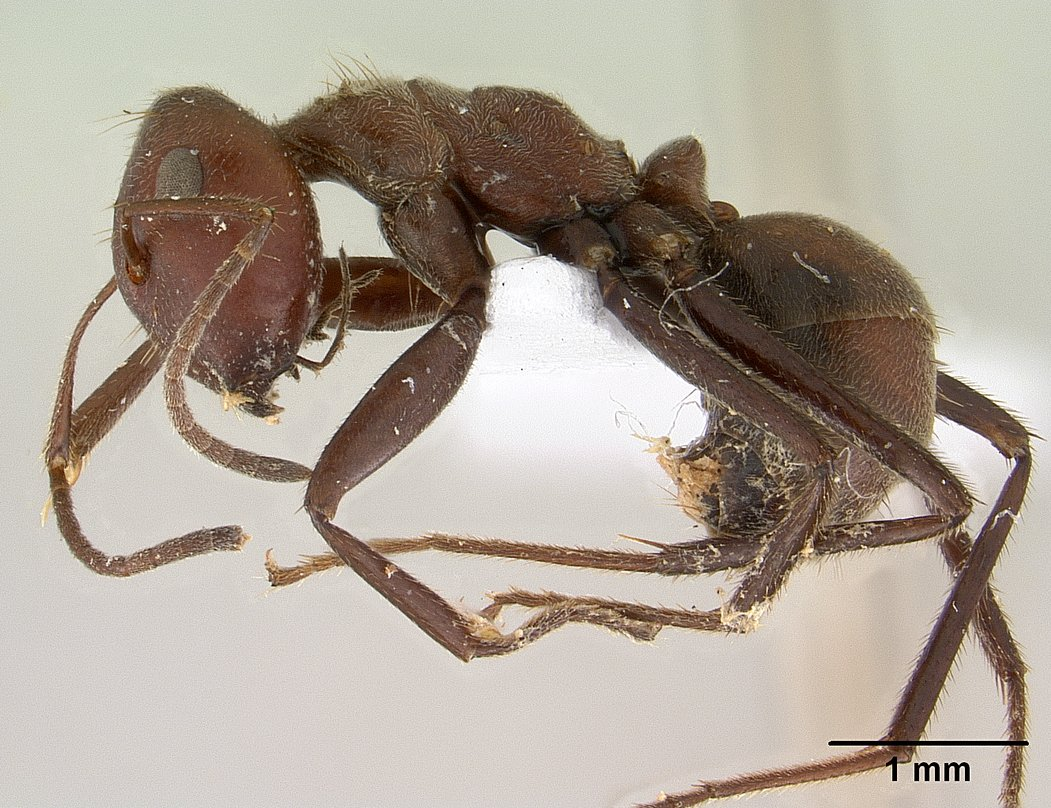

Scientific classification
- Kingdom: Animalia
- Phylum: Arthropoda
- Clade: Pancrustacea
- Class: Insecta
- Order: Hymenoptera
- Family: Formicidae
- Subfamily: Formicinae
- Genus: Colobopsis
- Species: C. saundersi

Binomial name
- Colobopsis saundersi (Emery, 1889)

Synonyms
- Camponotus saundersi

= Colobopsis saundersi =

Species of Asian ant

Colobopsis saundersi (synonym Camponotus saundersi), also called the Malaysian exploding ant or suicide ant, is a species of ant found in Malaysia and Brunei, belonging to the genus Colobopsis. A worker can explode suicidally and aggressively as an ultimate act of defense, an ability it has in common with several other species in this genus and a few other insects. The ant has an enormously enlarged mandibular gland, many times the size of other ants, which produces adhesive secretions for defense. According to a 2018 study, this species forms a species complex and is probably related to C. explodens, which is part of the C. cylindrica group.

== Defenses ==
Colobopsis saundersi's two oversized, poison-filled mandibular glands run the entire length of its body from its head to its bulbous gaster at its posterior.

Its defensive behaviours include self-destruction by autothysis, a term coined by Maschwitz and Maschwitz (1974). Two oversized, poison-filled mandibular glands run the entire length of the ant's body. When combat takes a turn for the worse, the worker ant violently contracts its abdominal muscles to rupture its gaster at the intersegmental fold, which also bursts the mandibular glands, thereby spraying a sticky secretion in all directions from the anterior region of its head. The glue, which also has corrosive properties and functions as a chemical irritant, can entangle and immobilize all nearby victims.

Direct observation by Jones (2004) found that C. saundersi adhesive secretions range from bright white at the end of the wet season to cream or pale yellow in the dry season and start of the wet season. These variations in coloration represent a shift in internal pH, likely due to seasonal changes in diet.

=== Territorial defense ===
Autothysis in C. saundersi is common during territorial battles with other ant species or groups. Territorial weaver ants (Oecophylla smaragdina) are known to stalk and attack C. saundersi for territory as well as for predation. Self-sacrifice of C. saundersi workers is likely to help the colony as a whole by ensuring that the colony retains its foraging territory. Therefore, such behavior would continue within a population given that the behavior was already genetically present within the majority of workers.

=== Defense against predation ===
C. saundersi uses autothysis to defend against predation by other arboreal arthropods (weaver ants, spiders), which are believed to be the main predatory threat to C. saundersi for two reasons:

- Jones (2004) noted through direct observation that C. saundersi is "remarkably sensitive" to even slight leaf vibration.
- The inherent adhesive qualities of C. saundersi's secretion are more effective in immobilizing the appendages of arthropods as opposed to those of vertebrates.

C. saundersi also uses autothysis to defend against vertebrate predators because the chemicals involved are inedible, which could deter certain predators from engaging this species of ant in the future.

== Chemicals ==
The "toxic glue" of C. saundersi is predominantly composed of polyacetates, aliphatic hydrocarbons, and alcohols. Branched-skeleton lactones and methylated isocoumarins produced in the hindgut function as trail pheromones, while straight-chain hydrocarbons and esters produced in the Dufour's glands act as alarm pheromones in C. saundersi and related species. Jones, et al. (2004) identified the following chemicals within the secretion:

Phenols

- m-cresol (traces found), a corrosive compound
- 2,4-Dihydroxyacetophenone
- 2-Methyl-5,7-dihydroxychromone
- Orcinol (traces found)

Aliphatics

- Undecane
- 2-Heptanone (traces found)

Terpenoids

- Citronellal
- Citronellol
- Citronellic acid
- Isopulegol
- (6R)-(E)-2,6-Dimethyl-2-octen-1,8-dioic acid

Both 2,4-Dihydroxyacetophenone and 2-Methyl-5,7-dihydroxychromone are phenolic ketones which cause the pH-dependent color changes of the secretion.

(6R)-(E)-2,6-Dimethyl-2-octen-1,8-dioic acid is an acyclic monoterpene previously undocumented in insects. However, the chemical is well known to be a urinary metabolite in mammals, with overproduction resulting in toxic acidosis in various species.

== Gallery ==
Colobopsis saundersi
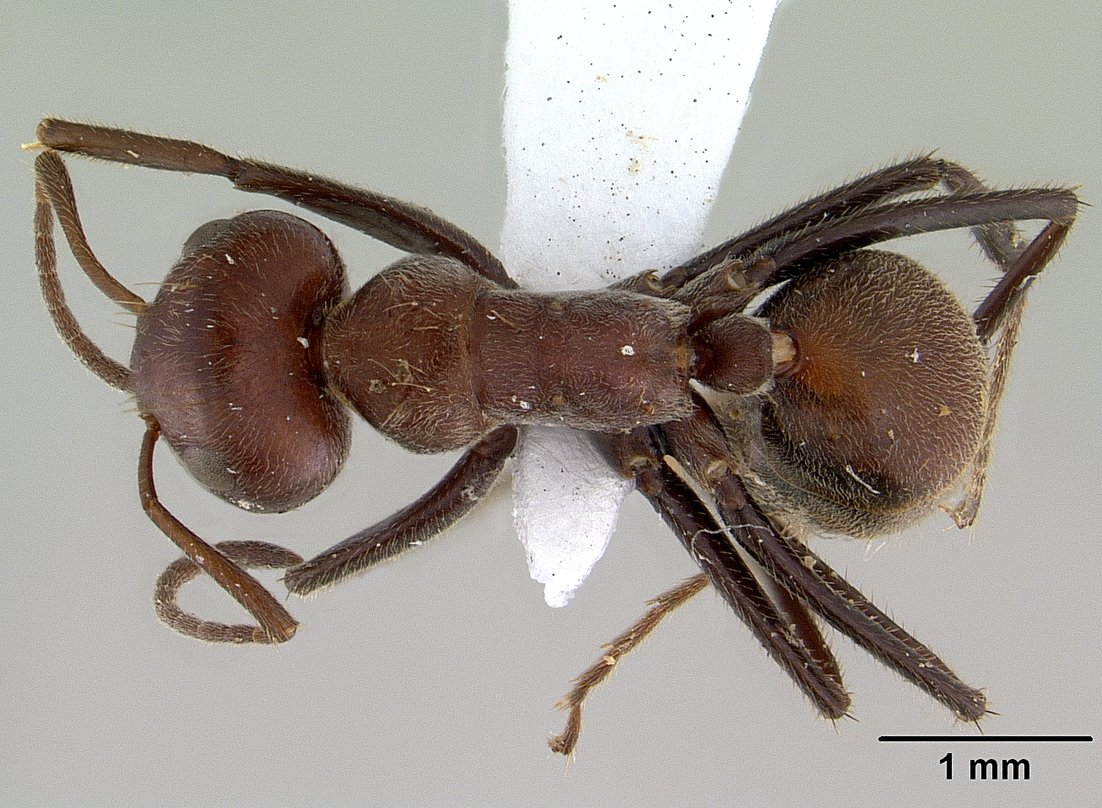
Dorsal view

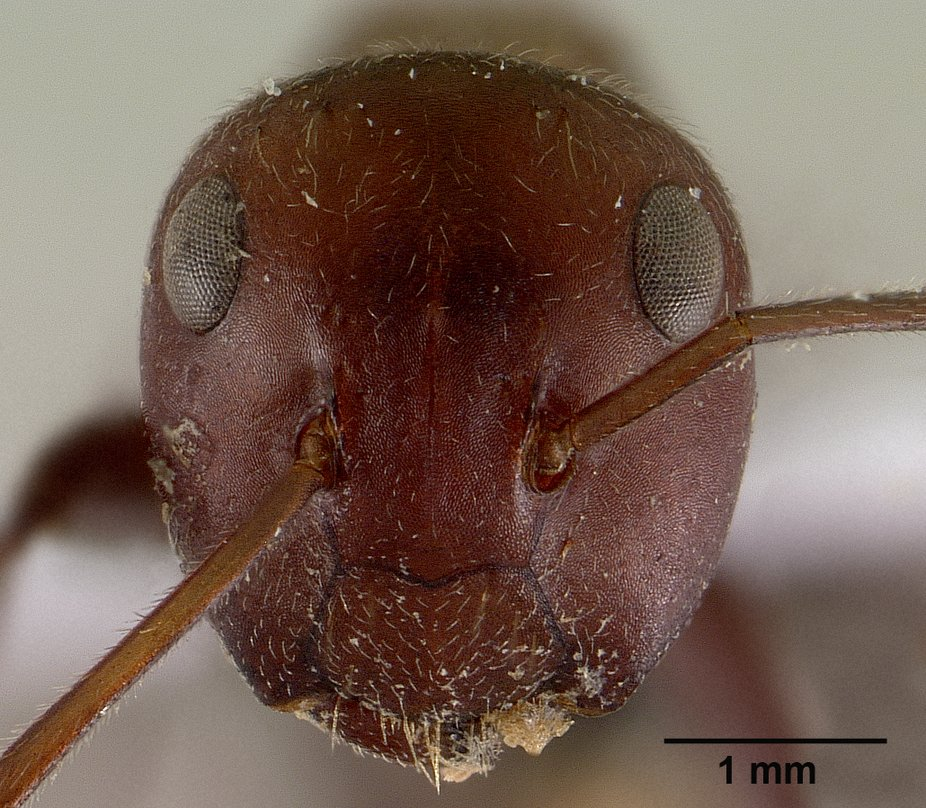
Frontal view

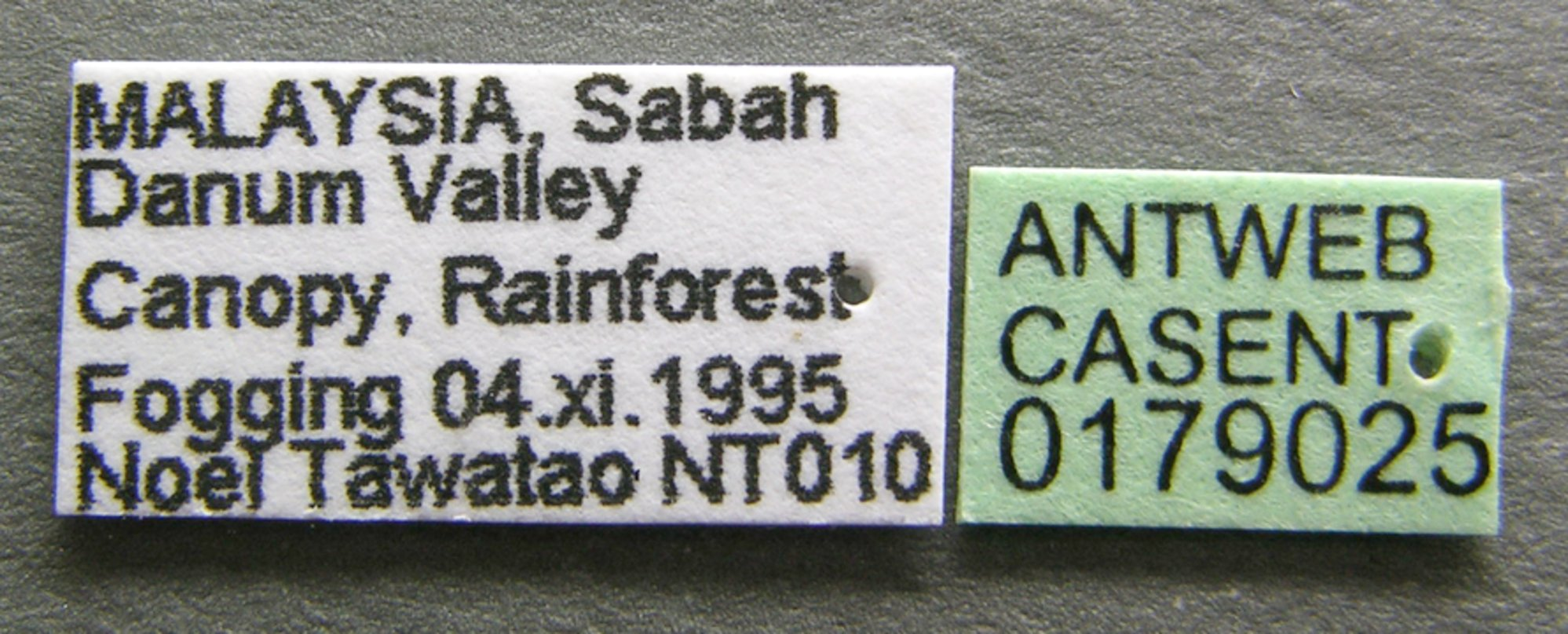
Label

== See also ==
- Colobopsis explodens – Species of Asian ant
- Globitermes sulphureus – Species of Asian termite
