= Calone =

Chemical compound

Names
- Preferred IUPAC name 7-Methyl-2,4-dihydro-3H-1,5-benzodioxepin-3-one
- Other names Calone 1951; Watermelon ketone; Methylbenzodioxepinone

Identifiers
CAS Number	28940-11-6
3D model (JSmol)	Interactive image
ChemSpider	107218
ECHA InfoCard	100.044.823
PubChem CID	120101
UNII	0NQ136C313
CompTox Dashboard (EPA)	DTXSID0047165
- InChI: InChI=1/C10H10O3/c1-7-2-3-9-10(4-7)13-6-8(11)5-12-9/h2-4H,5-6H2,1H3 Key: SWUIQEBPZIHZQS-UHFFFAOYAC
- SMILES: O=C1COc2c(OC1)cc(cc2)C

Properties
Chemical formula	C_{10}H_{10}O_{3}
Molar mass	178.187 g·mol^{−1}
Appearance	white crystals, flakes or clumps
Odor	distinctive
Melting point	35–41 °C (95–106 °F; 308–314 K)

Hazards
- Occupational safety and health (OHS/OSH)
Main hazards	irritant
- Except where otherwise noted, data are given for materials in their standard state (at 25 °C [77 °F], 100 kPa). Infobox references

Calone or methylbenzodioxepinone, trade-named Calone 1951, is an organic compound with the formula CH_{3}C_{6}H_{3}(OCH_{2})_{2}CO. A white solid, it is a derivative of 4-methylcatechol. In the fragrance industry it is known as "watermelon ketone" or simply "calone".

It was discovered by Pfizer in 1966. It is used to give the olfactory impression of a fresh seashore through the marine and ozone nuances (specifically, as fresh, watery, clean, melon, green, marine, and ozone). Calone is similar in structure to brown algae pheromones like ectocarpene and is also distantly related in structure to the drug diazepam.

Calone is an unusual chemical compound which has an intense "sea-breeze" note with slight floral and fruit overtones. It has been used as a scent component since the 1980s for its watery, fresh, ozone accords, and as a more dominant note in several perfumes of the marine trend, beginning in the 1990s. In 2014, Plummer et al. reported the synthesis and fragrance properties of several related aliphatic analogues. Swiss company Firmenich later released the isopropyl homologue of this substance under the brand name Cascalone - a sweet, watery version of calone with a transparent floral signature.
