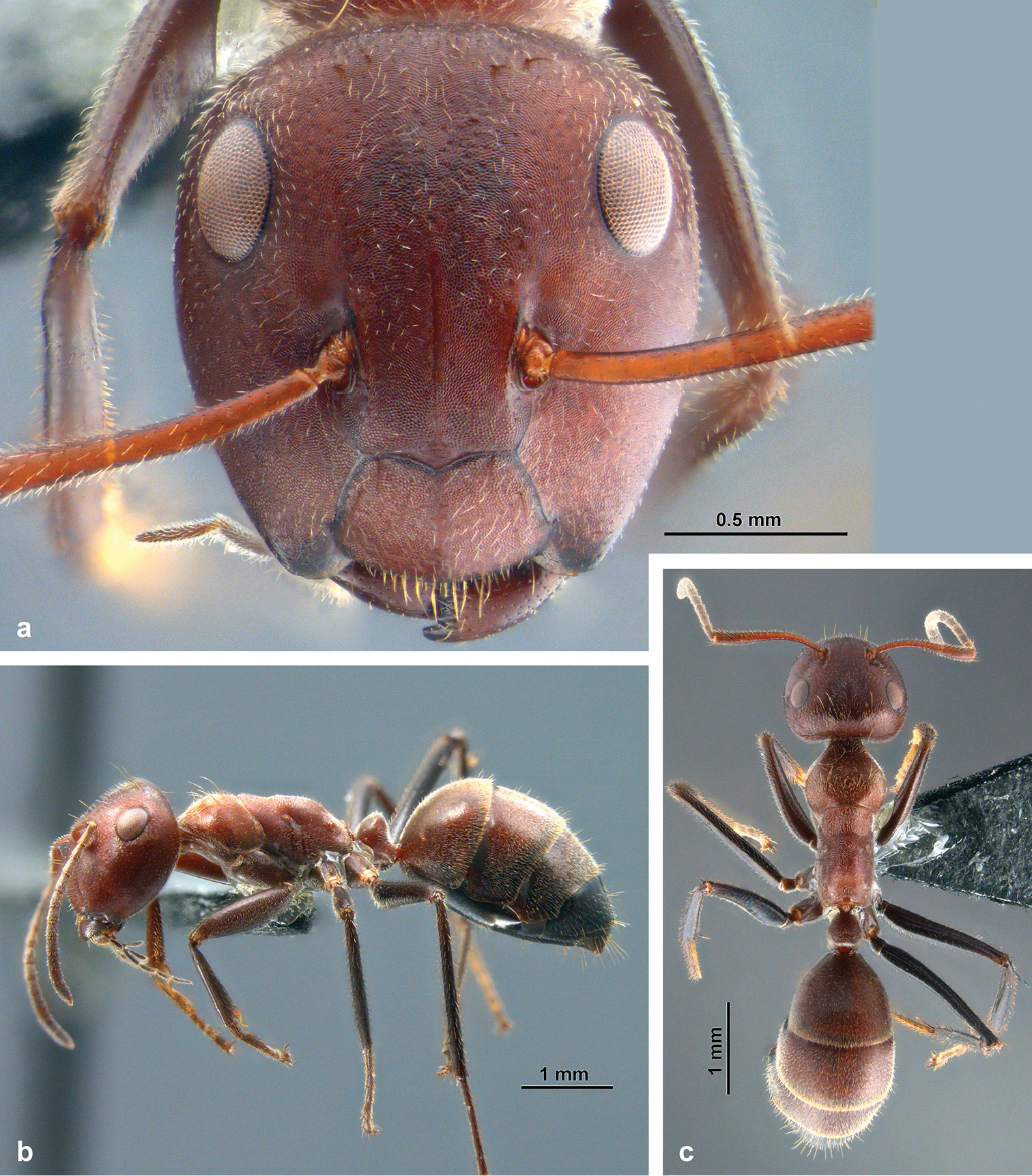

Scientific classification
- Kingdom: Animalia
- Phylum: Arthropoda
- Class: Insecta
- Order: Hymenoptera
- Family: Formicidae
- Subfamily: Formicinae
- Genus: Colobopsis
- Species: C. explodens

Binomial name
- Colobopsis explodens Laciny & Zettel 2018

= Colobopsis explodens =

Species of Asian ant

Colobopsis explodens is a species of ant which is found in Southeast Asia. Like some other species in its genus, it is noted for a rare combat mechanism of workers exploding in self-defense, smothering the enemy with a toxic and often deadly secretion. This suicidal defensive adaptation also occurs among some species of termites: it is termed autothysis, and as ants and termites are members of different insect orders, it is an example of convergent evolution.

== Common name ==
Scheme of a worker ant's anatomy

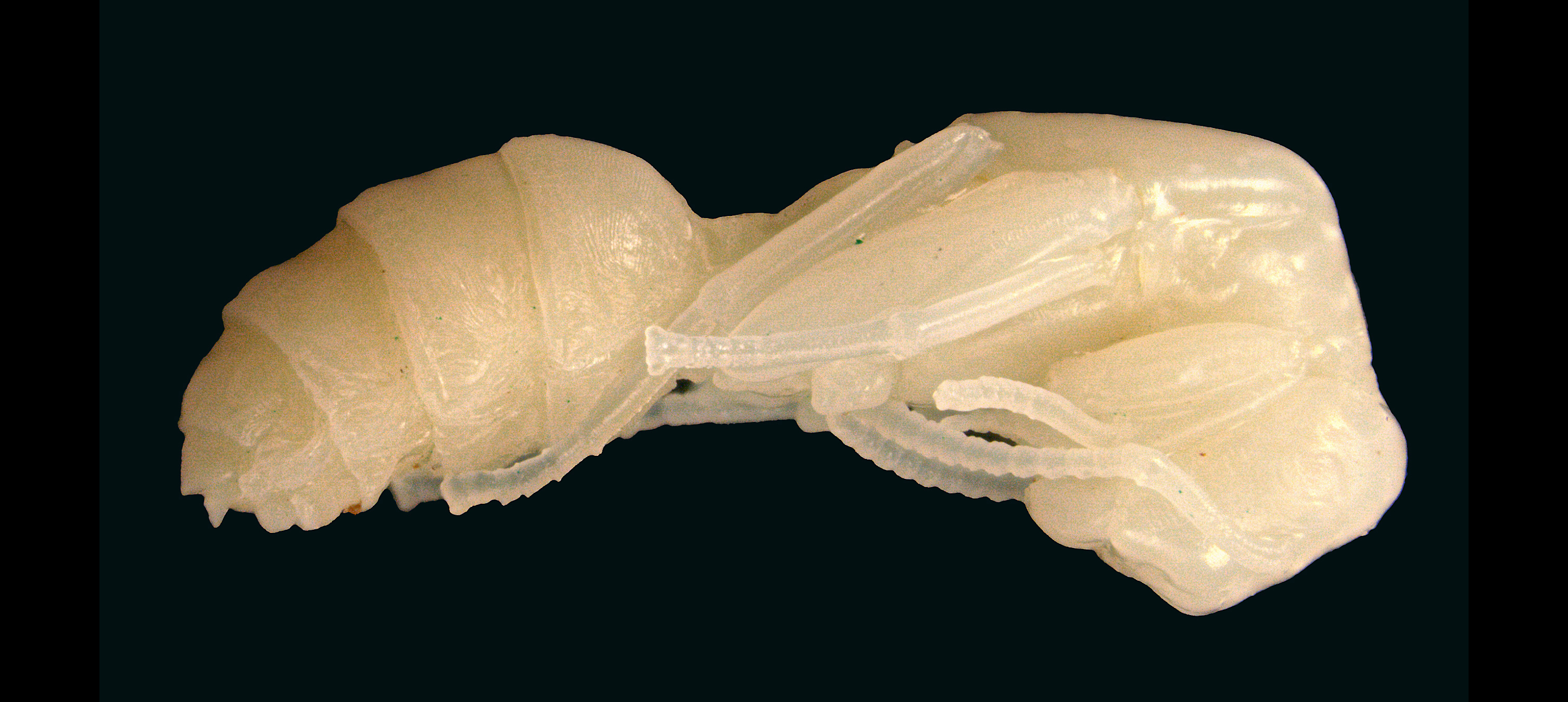
Colobopsis explodens pupa

In the past, it was informally known as "yellow goo," named after the brightly colored "goo" produced by its exploding worker ants.

== Range ==
They are found in countries in Southeast Asia, such as Thailand, Malaysia, and Borneo.

== Colonies and habitat ==
Their colonies can contain thousands of individual ants and inhabit the leafy canopies of trees. They often nest in trees of family Dipterocarpaceae. A colony may consist of multiple nests in several trees, connected by ant-trails. Their nests may be as high as 60 m above the ground. One colony was estimated to cover an area of at least 2,500 m.

== Defenses ==
This species is known for its unusual type of self-defense. The earliest recording was in 1916, but it was detailed fully in 1974. When threatened, it will voluntarily flex its gaster and explode, producing a highly toxic chemical sludge (with a spice-like smell) in an attempt to kill or repel said instigator. In addition to helping protect the ant against potentially threatening predators, it is thought due to its "strong antimicrobial and low insecticidal activity of the mandibular gland" to be a way the ants disinfect and protect their nest against harmful bacteria and fungi.

== Diet ==
Minor workers of this species will graze on epiphytes, presumably for food or at least liquid. They have also been found to consume yeast suspended in water, dead insects and fish offered to them.

== Gallery ==
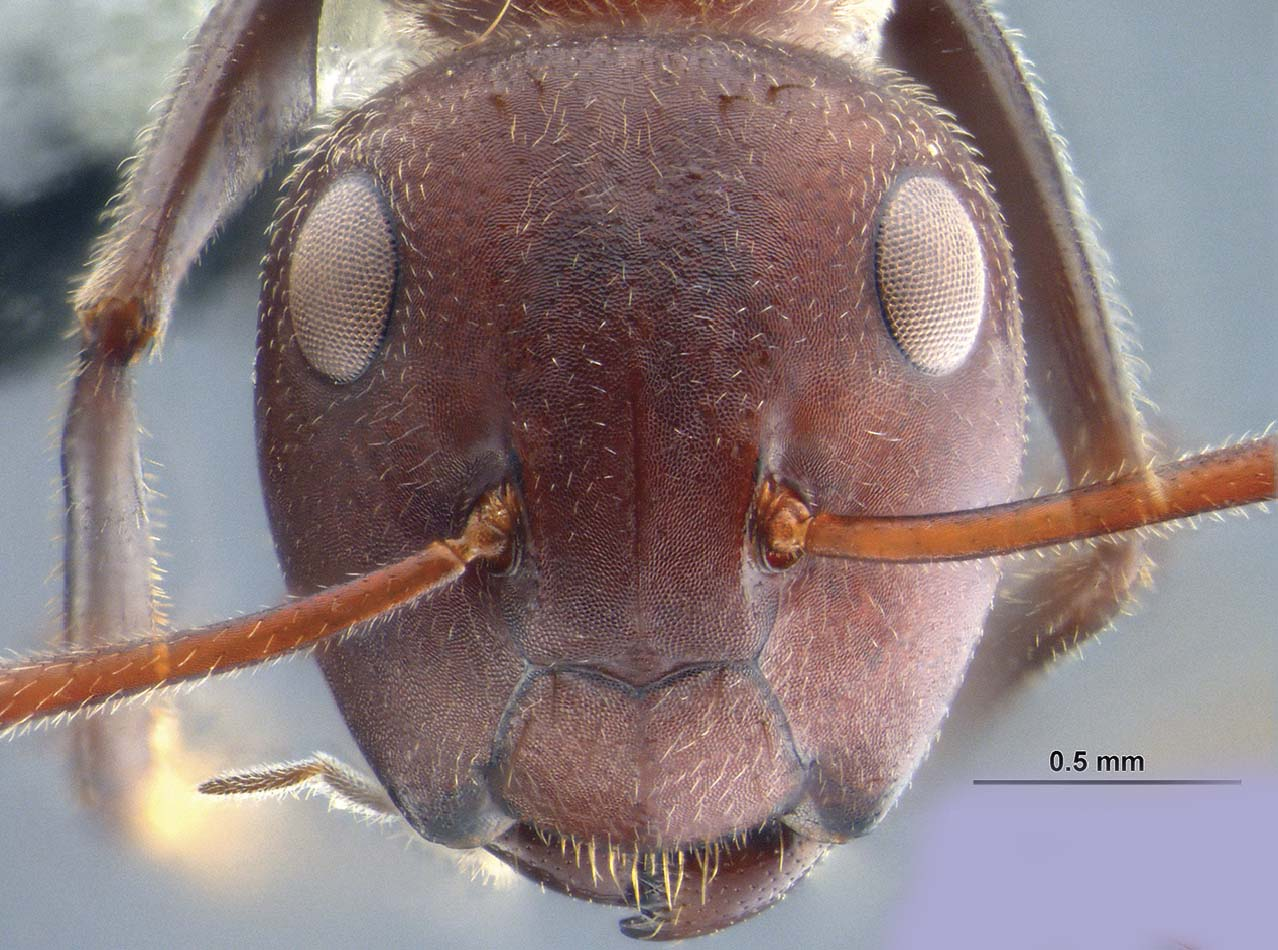
Head of Colobopsis explodens worker

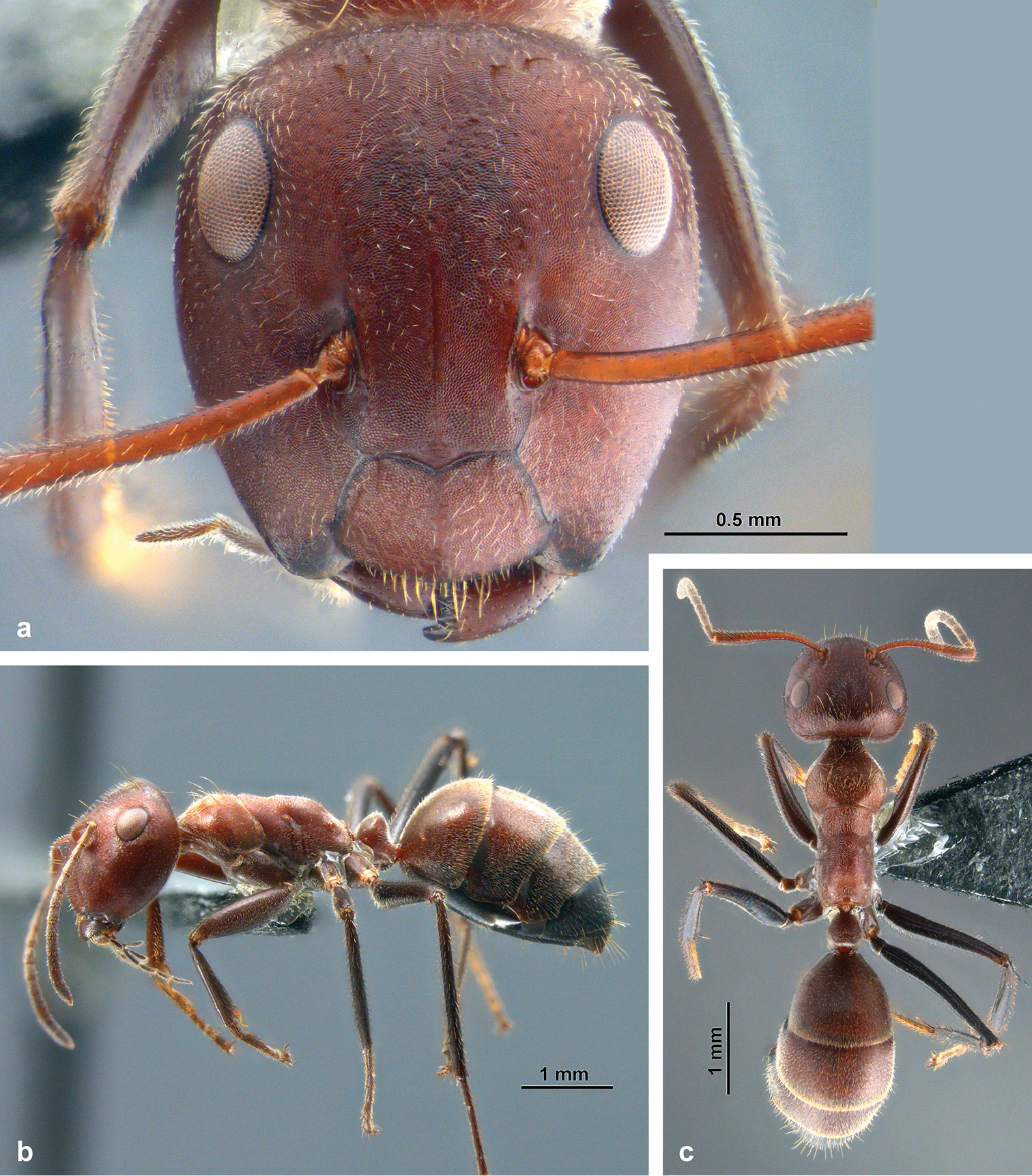
Colobopsis explodens worker

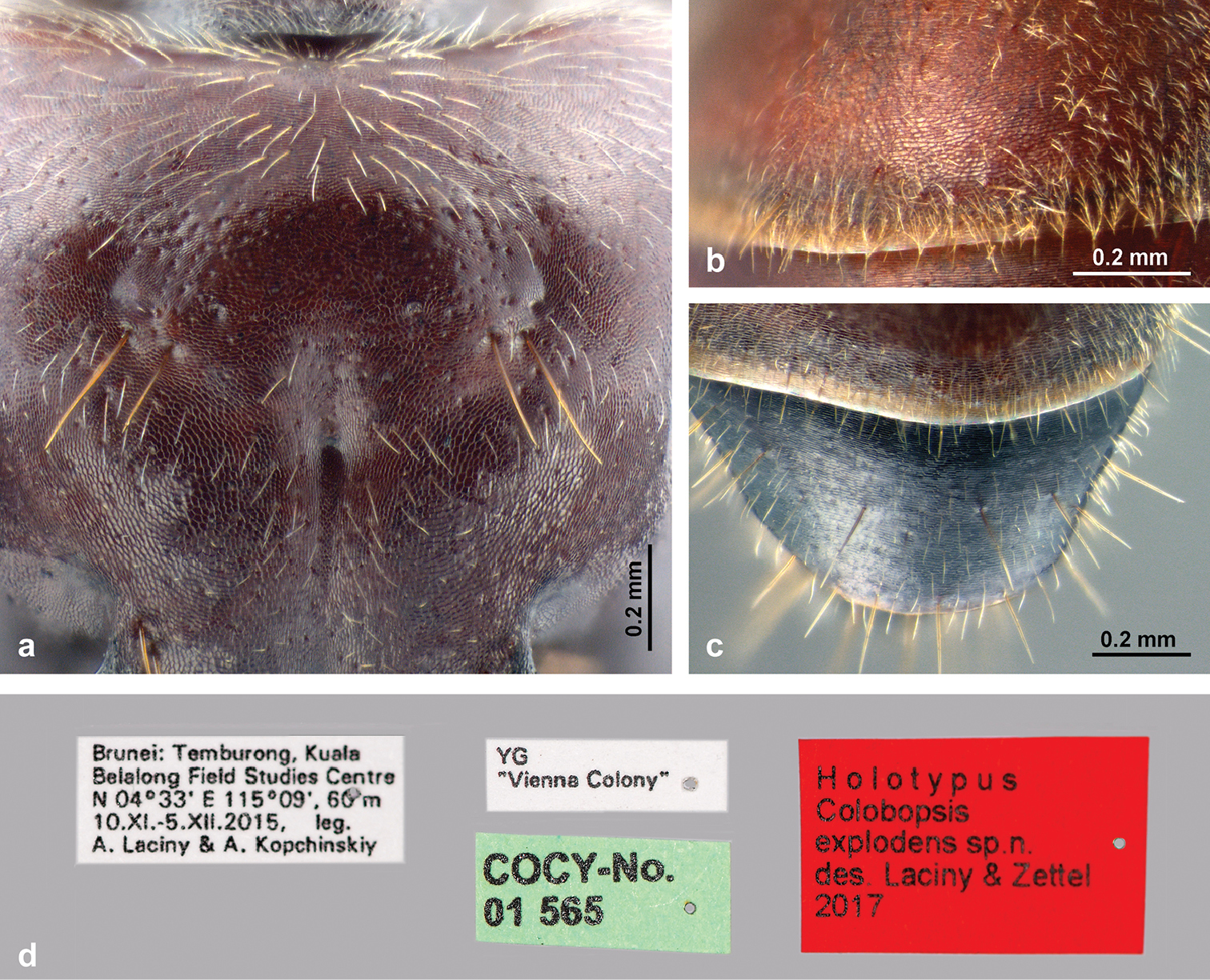
Colobopsis explodens worker. (a) vertex of major worker (paratype), (b) gastral tergite I, (c) gastral tergite IV of minor worker (holotype), (d) labels of holotype, minor worker

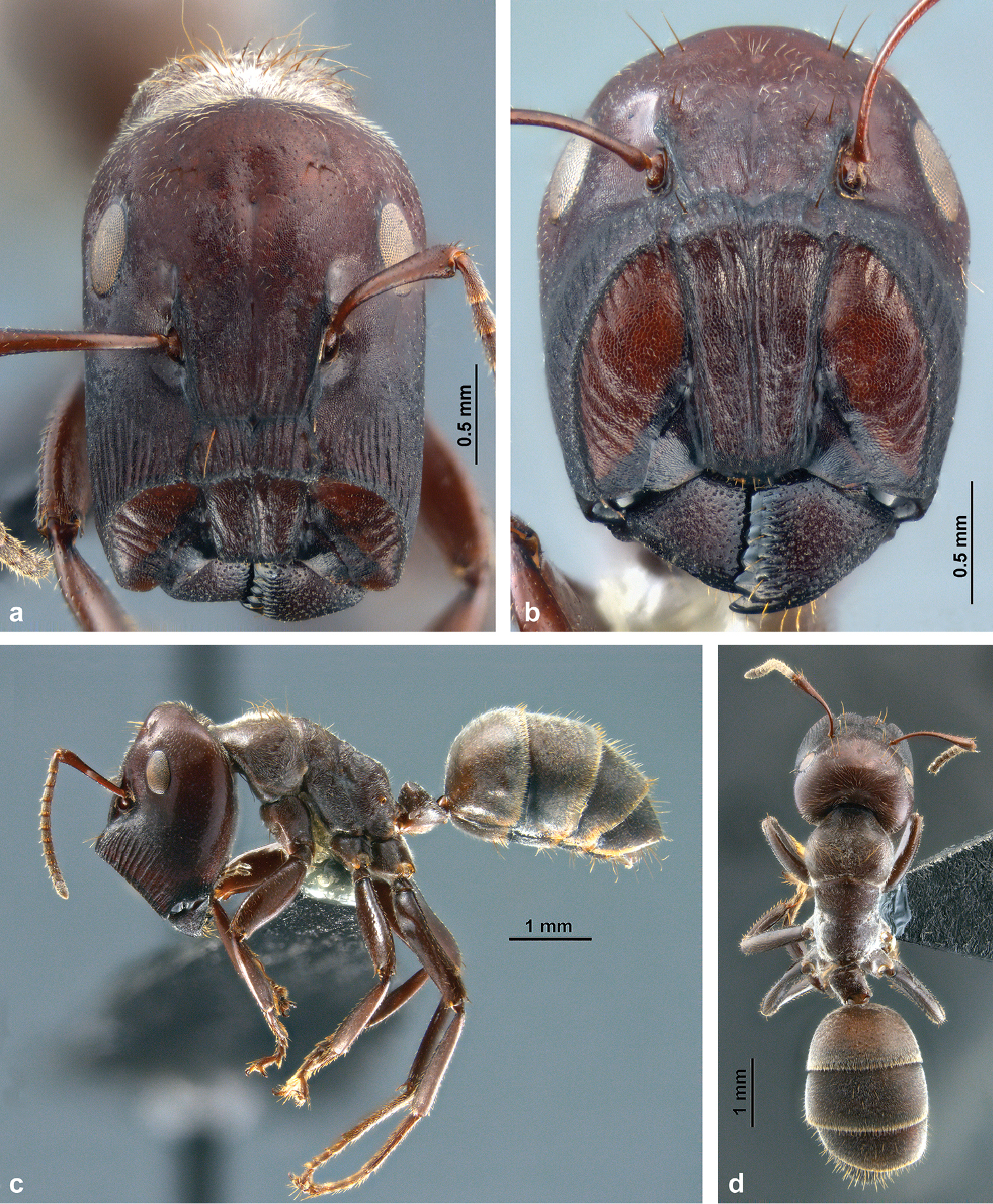
Colobopsis explodens soldier. (a) full-face view, (b) frontal shield (c) lateral view, (d) dorsal view

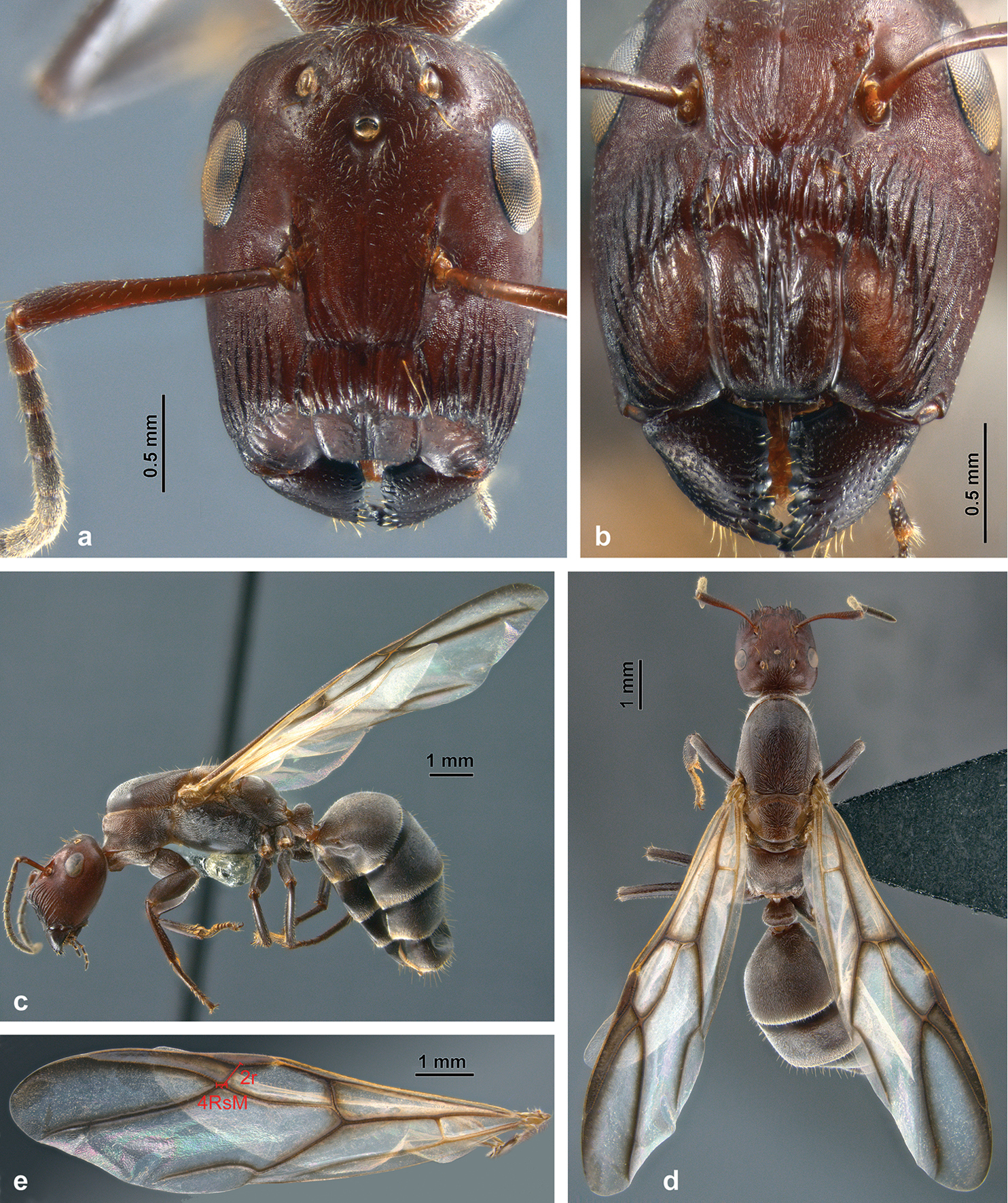
Colobopsis explodens queen. (a) full-face view, (b) frontal shield (c) lateral view, (d) dorsal view, (e) forewing with indicated measurements 2r and 4RsM

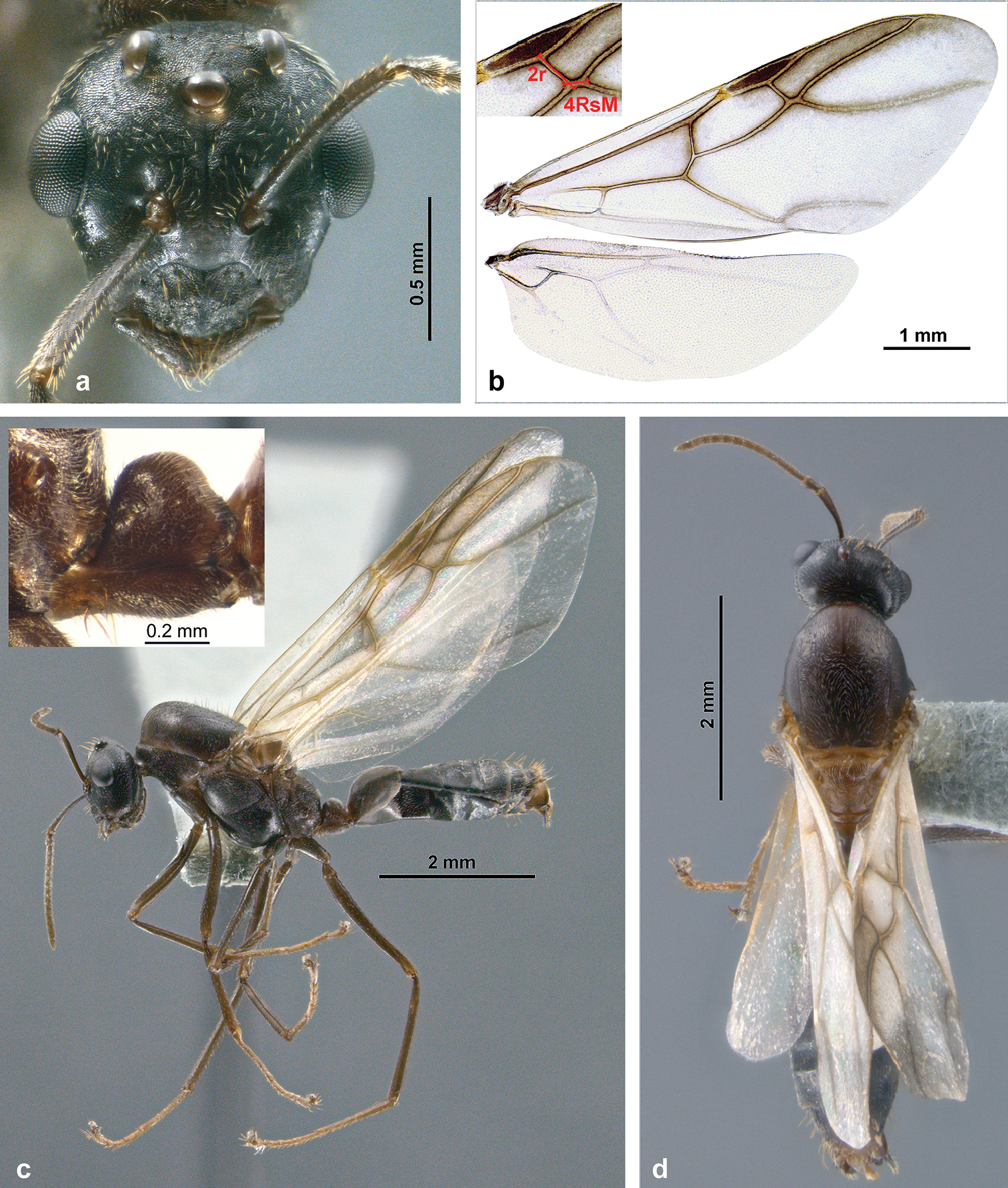
Colobopsis explodens male. (a) full-face view, (b) wings (c) lateral view, (d) dorsal view

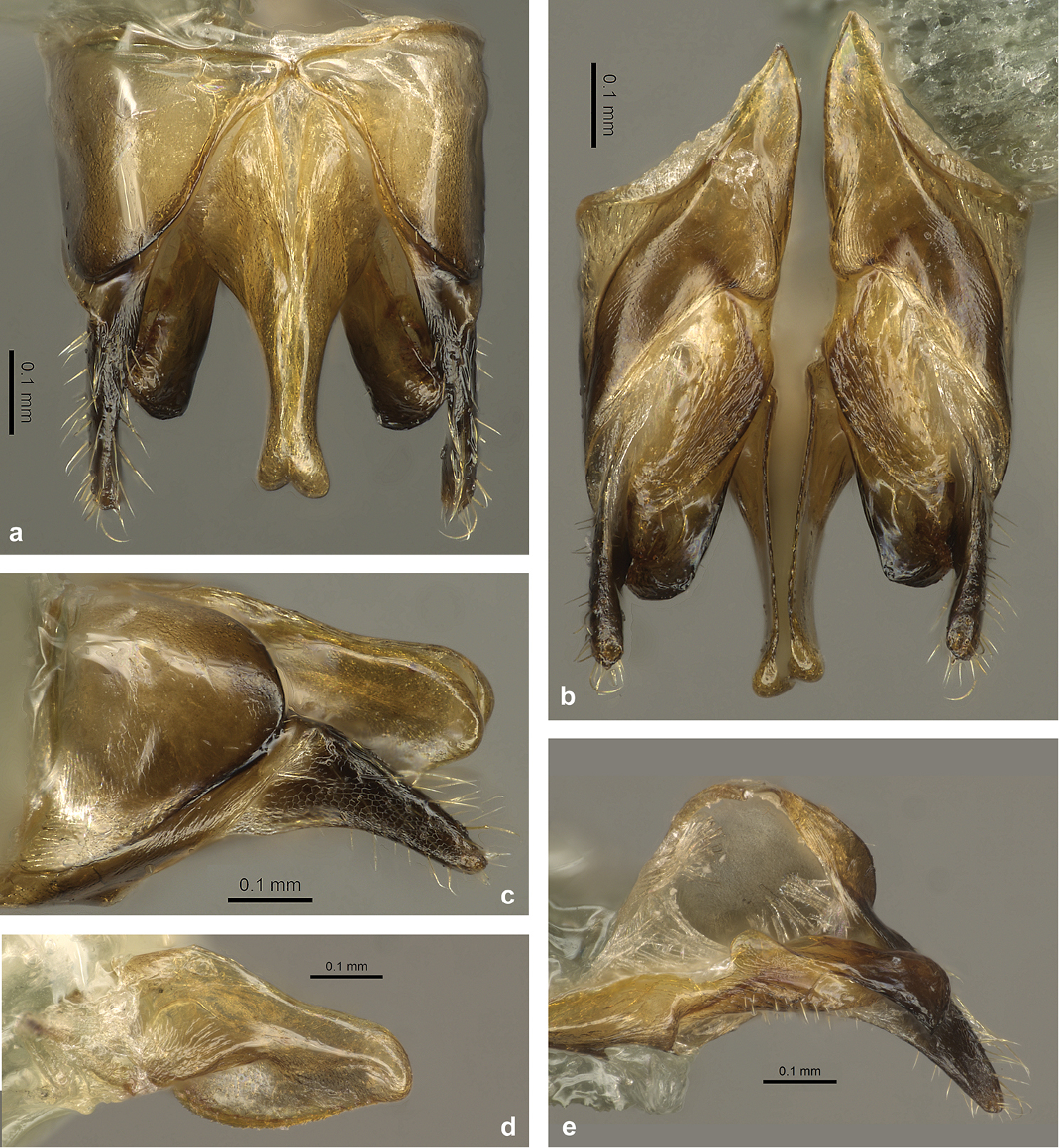
Colobopsis explodens male reproductive system and genitals. (a) dorsal, (b) ventral (c) lateral view, (d) left penis valve, (e) right volsella and gonostylus
