= Cidex =

CIDEX is a brand name for a Glutaraldehyde-free (0.55% ortho-phthalaldehyde) high-level disinfecting solution used within the field of medicine.

The CIDEX brand name has been registered as a trademark since 1962.

- Cidex OPA solution, with ortho-phthalaldehyde as active ingredient
- Nu-Cidex, with peracetic acid This product is discontinued.
- Cidex Plus, with glutaraldehyde This product is discontinued.
