= Bevantolol =

Chemical compound

Clinical data
- AHFS/Drugs.com: International Drug Names
- Routes of administration: Oral
- ATC code: C07AB06 (WHO)

Identifiers
- IUPAC name: (RS)-[2-(3,4-dimethoxyphenyl)ethyl][2-hydroxy-3-(3-methylphenoxy)propyl]amine
- CAS Number: 59170-23-9
- PubChem CID: 2372
- DrugBank: DB01295
- ChemSpider: 2282
- UNII: 34ZXW6ZV21
- ChEBI: CHEBI:238698
- ChEMBL: ChEMBL314010
- CompTox Dashboard (EPA): DTXSID70860597

Chemical and physical data
- Formula: C_{20}H_{27}NO_{4}
- Molar mass: 345.439 g·mol^{−1}
- 3D model (JSmol): Interactive image
- Chirality: Racemic mixture
- SMILES: O(c1ccc(cc1OC)CCNCC(O)COc2cc(ccc2)C)C
- InChI: InChI=1S/C20H27NO4/c1-15-5-4-6-18(11-15)25-14-17(22)13-21-10-9-16-7-8-19(23-2)20(12-16)24-3/h4-8,11-12,17,21-22H,9-10,13-14H2,1-3H3; Key:HXLAFSUPPDYFEO-UHFFFAOYSA-N

Bevantolol (INN) was a drug candidate for angina and hypertension that acted as both a beta blocker and a calcium channel blocker. It was discovered and developed by Warner-Lambert but in January 1989 the company announced that it had withdrawn the New Drug Application; the company's chairman said: "Who needs the 30th beta blocker?" As of 2016 it wasn't marketed in the US, UK, or Europe and the authors of a Cochrane review could find no product monograph for it.
