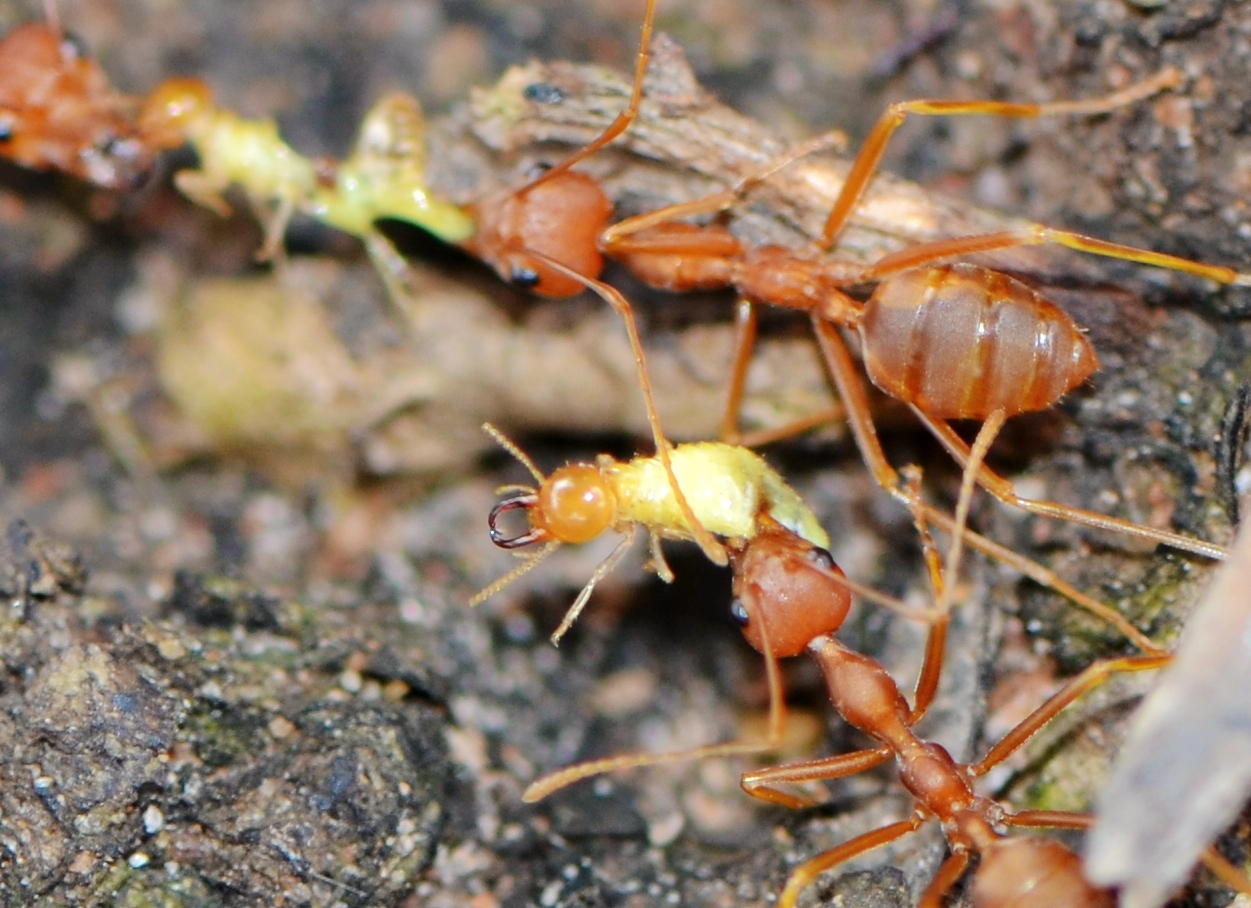
- A Globitermes sulphureus nest under attack by Oecophylla smaragdina weaver ants.

Scientific classification
- Kingdom: Animalia
- Phylum: Arthropoda
- Clade: Pancrustacea
- Class: Insecta
- Order: Blattodea
- Infraorder: Isoptera
- Family: Termitidae
- Genus: Globitermes
- Species: G. sulphureus

Binomial name
- Globitermes sulphureus (Haviland, 1898)

Synonyms
- Termes sulphureus Haviland, 1898

= Globitermes sulphureus =

Species of Asian termite

Globitermes sulphureus is a species of termite that is very common in central and southern Vietnam and also present in other areas of South East Asia, including Cambodia, Thailand, and Peninsular Malaysia. They live in nests made of earth that can be up to 1.5 m tall and can contain tens of thousands of individuals. Between five and 10 per cent of the population are soldier termites which can be recognised by their yellow abdomen and two large, curved mandibles. The termites use autothysis as a defense mechanism.

== Defense ==
A drawing of the head of a soldier termite showing the head (H), antennae (A) and the mandibles (M). Scale bar = 0.3mm

When the nest is damaged, the soldier termites defend the nest and workers rapidly repair any damage to the nest walls. The soldiers stand on alert on their legs and scan the area with their antennae. If the nest is attacked by ants, for example Oecophylla smaragdina, the workers immediately escape by retreating into the nest, while the soldiers remain outside to defend the nest. They will first attempt to catch and pierce the attackers with their large mandibles. If this does not deter the attackers, some soldiers secrete a yellow liquid from a large gland that occupies a large proportion of their body. The liquid is forced out of the gland by contractions of the mandibular muscles which compress the walls of the gland. This liquid rapidly hardens on contact with air, producing a sticky substance that traps ants and other termites. The secretion also contains a pheromone which attracts more soldiers to fight the attackers. In some cases, the contractions are so violent that the termites rupture themselves. This form of suicidal altruism is known as autothysis.

== Nitrogen fixation ==
G. sulphureus is able to fix nitrogen. An experiment in Thailand found that they fix around 250 grams of nitrogen per hectare per year. Although this contribution is only between 7% and 22% of the total nitrogen inputs in the ecosystem it is thought to be relatively important as termites add it to dead wood, thereby accelerating its decomposition.

== Foraging ==
G. sulphureus forages areas of up to 62m^{2} and ventures up to 16m away from its nest.

== Control ==
The species is a major pest in areas it inhabits as it attacks wooden structures and can damage coconut and oil palm plantations. Experiments have shown that it can be controlled using the insecticide imidacloprid.

== See also ==
- Colobopsis explodens – Species of Asian ant
- Colobopsis saundersi – Species of Asian ant Its defensive mechanism is similar to that of Globitermes sulphureus.
