= P-Cresol =

Chemical compound

p-Cresol
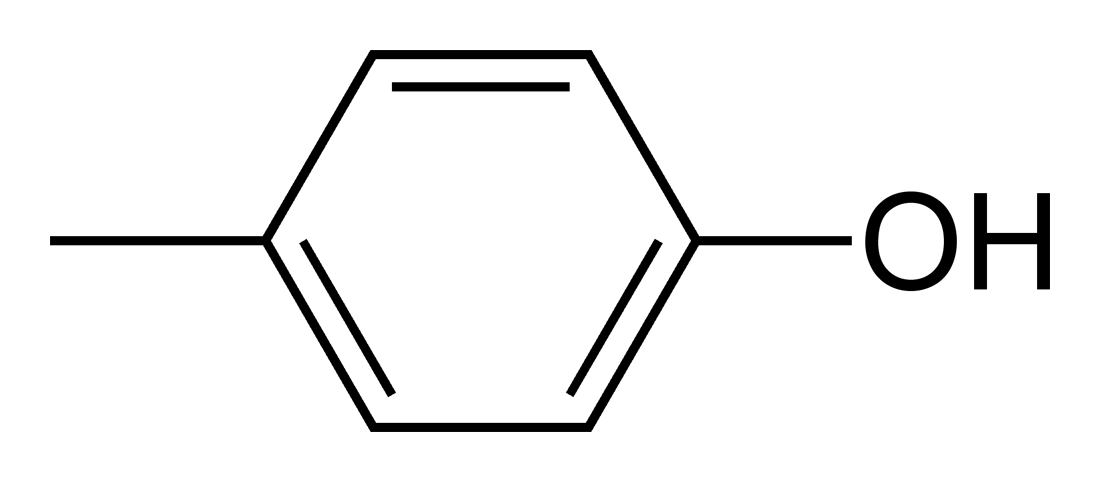
- Skeletal formula of p-cresol

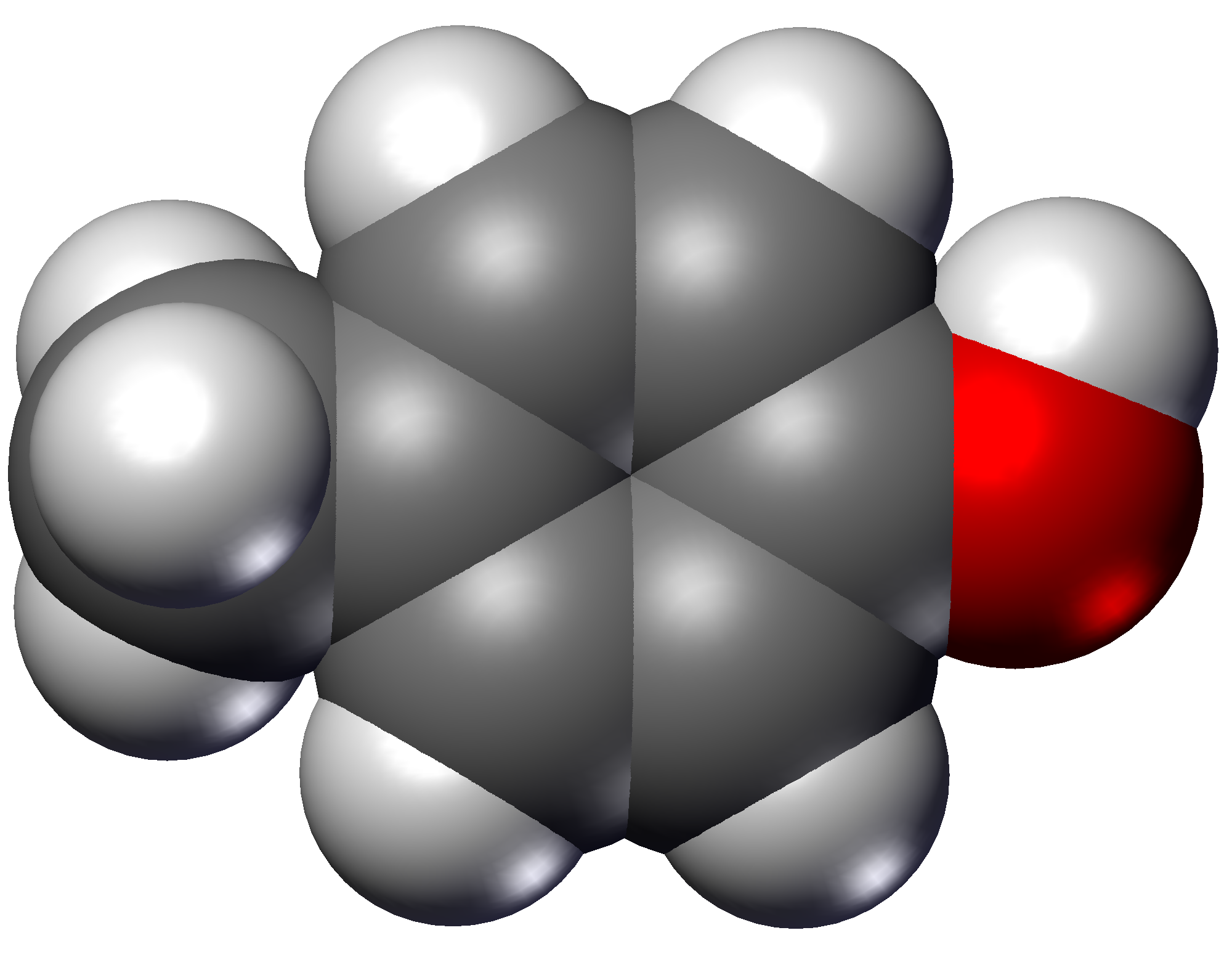
- 3D model of p-cresol

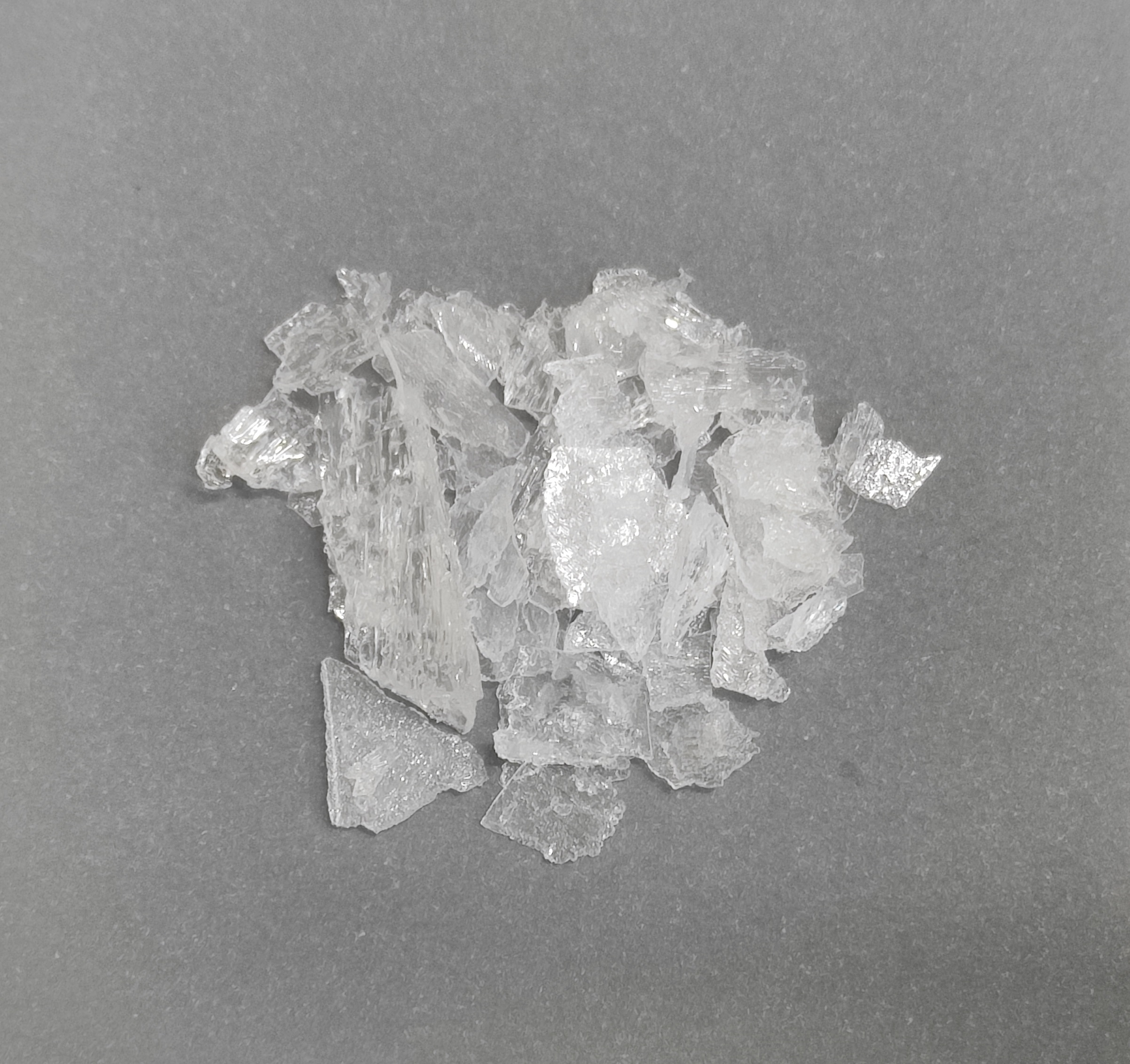

Names
- Preferred IUPAC name 4-Methylphenol
- Systematic IUPAC name 4-Methylbenzenol
- Other names 4-Cresol p-Cresol; 4-Hydroxytoluene p-Cresylic acid 1-Hydroxy-4-methylbenzene

Identifiers
CAS Number	106-44-5
3D model (JSmol)	Interactive image
Beilstein Reference	1305151
ChEBI	CHEBI:17847
ChEMBL	ChEMBL16645
ChemSpider	13839082
DrugBank	DB01688
ECHA InfoCard	100.003.090
EC Number	203-398-6
Gmelin Reference	2779
KEGG	C01468
PubChem CID	2879
RTECS number	GO6475000
UNII	1MXY2UM8NV
CompTox Dashboard (EPA)	DTXSID7021869
- InChI: InChI=1S/C7H8O/c1-6-2-4-7(8)5-3-6/h2-5,8H,1H3 Key: IWDCLRJOBJJRNH-UHFFFAOYSA-N; InChI=1/C7H8O/c1-6-2-4-7(8)5-3-6/h2-5,8H,1H3 Key: IWDCLRJOBJJRNH-UHFFFAOYAN
- SMILES: Cc1ccc(O)cc1

Properties
Chemical formula	C_{7}H_{8}O
Molar mass	108.140 g·mol^{−1}
Appearance	colorless prismatic crystals
Density	1.0347 g/ml
Melting point	35.5 °C (95.9 °F; 308.6 K)
Boiling point	201.8 °C (395.2 °F; 474.9 K)
Solubility in water	2.4 g/100 ml at 40 °C; 5.3 g/100 ml at 100 °C
Solubility in ethanol	miscible
Solubility in diethyl ether	miscible
Vapor pressure	0.11 mmHg (25 °C)
Magnetic susceptibility (χ)	−72.1×10^{−6} cm^{3}/mol
Refractive index (n_{D})	1.5395

Hazards
- Occupational safety and health (OHS/OSH)
Main hazards	May be fatal if swallowed, inhaled, or absorbed through skin.
- GHS labelling
Pictograms	(GHS05: Corrosive) (GHS06: Toxic) (GHS08: Health hazard)
Signal word	Danger
Hazard statements	H201, H311, H314, H351, H370, H372, H373, H401, H412
Precautionary statements	P201, P202, P260, P264, P270, P273, P280, P281, P301+P310, P301+P330+P331, P302+P352, P303+P361+P353, P304+P340, P305+P351+P338, P307+P311, P308+P313, P310, P312, P314, P321, P322, P330, P361, P363, P405, P501
NFPA 704 (fire diamond)	3 1 0
Flash point	86.1 °C (187.0 °F; 359.2 K)
Explosive limits	1.1%–?
- Lethal dose or concentration (LD, LC)
LD_{50} (median dose)	207 mg/kg (oral, rat, 1969); 1800 mg/kg (oral, rat, 1944); 344 mg/kg (oral, mouse)
- NIOSH (US health exposure limits)
PEL (Permissible)	TWA 5 ppm (22 mg/m^{3}) [skin]
REL (Recommended)	TWA 2.3 ppm (10 mg/m^{3})
IDLH (Immediate danger)	250 ppm
Safety data sheet (SDS)	External MSDS

Related compounds
Related phenols	o-cresol, m-cresol, phenol
- Except where otherwise noted, data are given for materials in their standard state (at 25 °C [77 °F], 100 kPa). verify (what is ?) Infobox references

para-Cresol, also 4-methylphenol, is an organic compound with the formula CH_{3}C_{6}H_{4}(OH). It is a colourless solid that is widely used intermediate in the production of other chemicals. It is a derivative of phenol and is an isomer of o-cresol and m-cresol.

== Production ==
Together with many other compounds, p-cresol is conventionally extracted from coal tar, the volatilized materials obtained in the roasting of coal to produce coke. This residue contains a few percent by weight of phenol and cresols. Industrially, p-cresol is currently prepared mainly by a two-step route beginning with the sulfonation of toluene:

CH_{3}C_{6}H_{5} + H_{2}SO_{4} → CH_{3}C_{6}H_{4}SO_{3}H + H_{2}O

Basic hydrolysis of the sulfonate salt gives the sodium salt of the cresol:

CH_{3}C_{6}H_{4}SO_{3}H + 2 NaOH → CH_{3}C_{6}H_{4}OH + Na_{2}SO_{3} + H_{2}O

Other methods for the production of p-cresol include chlorination of toluene followed by hydrolysis. In the cymene-cresol process, toluene is alkylated with propene to give p-cymene, which can be oxidatively dealkylated in a manner similar to the cumene process.

== Applications ==
p-Cresol is consumed mainly in the production of antioxidants, such as butylated hydroxytoluene (BHT). The monoalkylated derivatives undergo coupling to give an extensive family of diphenol antioxidants. These antioxidants are valued because they are relatively low in toxicity and nonstaining.

== Natural occurrences ==
=== In humans ===
p-Cresol is produced by bacterial fermentation of protein in the human large intestine. It is excreted in feces and urine, and is a component of human sweat that attracts female mosquitoes.

p-Cresol is a constituent of tobacco smoke.

=== In other species ===
p-Cresol is a major component in pig odor. Temporal glands secretion examination showed the presence of phenol and p-cresol during musth in male elephants. It is one of the very few compounds to attract the orchid bee Euglossa cyanura and has been used to capture and study the species. p-Cresol is a component found in horse urine during estrus that can elicit the Flehmen response.

p-Cresol is found in numerous essential oils - typically in trace quantities where its intense odour imparts an animalic character.
