= Tolamolol =

Names
- Preferred IUPAC name 4-(2-{[2-Hydroxy-3-(3-methylphenoxy)propyl]amino}ethoxy)benzamide

Identifiers
CAS Number	38103-61-6
3D model (JSmol)	Interactive image
ChemSpider	34753
ECHA InfoCard	100.048.877
PubChem CID	37910
UNII	F03W3WUW58
CompTox Dashboard (EPA)	DTXSID4046230
- InChI: InChI=1S/C19H24N2O4/c1-14-4-2-3-5-18(14)25-13-16(22)12-21-10-11-24-17-8-6-15(7-9-17)19(20)23/h2-9,16,21-22H,10-13H2,1H3,(H2,20,23) Key: SKQDKFOTIPJUSV-UHFFFAOYSA-N
- SMILES: CC1=CC=CC=C1OCC(CNCCOC2=CC=C(C=C2)C(=O)N)O

Properties
Chemical formula	C_{19}H_{24}N_{2}O_{4}
Molar mass	344.411 g·mol^{−1}
- Except where otherwise noted, data are given for materials in their standard state (at 25 °C [77 °F], 100 kPa). Infobox references

Tolamolol is a beta adrenergic receptor antagonist.
