= Autothysis =

Defense mechanism in which an animal explodes intentionally

Autothysis (from the Greek roots autos- αὐτός "self" and thysia θυσία "sacrifice") or suicidal altruism is the process where an animal destroys itself via an internal rupturing or explosion of an organ which ruptures the skin. The term was proposed by Ulrich Maschwitz and Eleonore Maschwitz in 1974 to describe the defensive mechanism of Colobopsis saundersi, a species of ant. It is caused by a contraction of muscles around a large gland that leads to the breaking of the gland wall. Some termites (such as the soldiers of Globitermes sulphureus) release a sticky secretion by rupturing a gland near the skin of their neck, producing a tar effect in defense against ants.

== Termites ==
Groups of termites whose soldiers have been found to use autothysis to defend their colonies include Serritermes serrifer, Dentispicotermes, Genuotermes, and Orthognathotermes. Several species of the soldierless Apicotermitinae, for example those of the Grigiotermes and Ruptitermes genera, have workers that can also use autothysis. This is thought to be one of the most effective forms of defense that termites possess as the ruptured workers block the tunnels running into the nest and it causes a one-to-one exchange between attackers and defenders, meaning attacks have a high energy cost to predators.

The soldiers of the Neotropical termite family Serritermitidae have a defense strategy which involves front gland autothysis, with the body rupturing between the head and abdomen. When outside the nest they try to run away from attackers, and only use autothysis when in the nest to block tunnels up, preventing attackers entering.

Old workers of Neocapritermes taracua develop blue spots on their abdomens that are filled with copper-containing proteins (blue laccase). These react with a secretion from the labial gland upon autothysis to form a mixture which is toxic to other termites.

== Ants ==
Some ants belonging to the genera Camponotus and Colobopsis have adapted to using autothysis as an altruistic defensive trait to better fight against arthropods and to possibly deter vertebrate predators for the benefit of the colony as a whole. These ants use autothysis as a self-destructive defense to protect their territory, but they use it differently from termites, in that their primary uses for autothysis do not include blocking the tunnels of their territory from attackers, but more so for combat purposes during territorial battles.

Early ants used mechanical means of stinging to defend themselves, but the stings showed to be more useful against large vertebrate predators and not as successful against other arthropods; as such, selection for autothysis in ants evolved as a way to more effectively kill arthropod enemies. The products of autothysis in ants are sticky and corrosive substances, released by the ants' contraction of their gasters, leading to a burst at an intersegmental fold as well as the mandibular glands. The ants use this self-sacrifice to kill one or more enemies which entangle themselves in this sticky substance. The worker ant has been observed to wrap itself around an opponent, placing its dorsal gaster onto the opponent's head before expelling sticky corrosive material from its mouth and gaster, permanently sticking to the opponent while killing itself and the enemy, as well as any other enemies that become stuck to the products.

These ants mostly use autothysis against other arthropods, like invading ant colonies or against termite colonies, and are rather ineffective towards larger vertebrate predators such as lizards or birds. This self-sacrifice is most useful against arthropods because the sticky adhesives in the products work best against the bodies of other arthropods. The compounds used in autothysis, however, have also been explained to have some use in deterring vertebrate predators from eating the ants, because these products are inedible.

== Aphids ==
A gall forming social aphid Nipponaphis monzeni is known for performing a spectacular self-sacrificing gall repairing behavior, which is regarded as a sort of autothysis. The aphid forms a large ball-shaped plant-made nest, called the gall, in which hundreds of aphids are living as a colony. When enemies damage the gall, first-instar soldier nymphs erupt to discharge white body fluid, mix the secretion with their legs, and skillfully plaster it over the plant injury. Dozens of soldiers come out, explode, mix, and plaster, and the gall breach is sealed up with the solidified body fluid. The soldier's body fluid is full of numerous large globular cells that contain high levels of phenoloxidase and lipids, which play central roles in body fluid coagulation for the self-sacrificing gall repair.

== See also ==
- Animal suicide
- Anti-predator adaptation
- Apoptosis
- Autohaemorrhaging
- Exploding animal
- Self-destruct
