= Antarctic fishes =

Common name for several species of fish

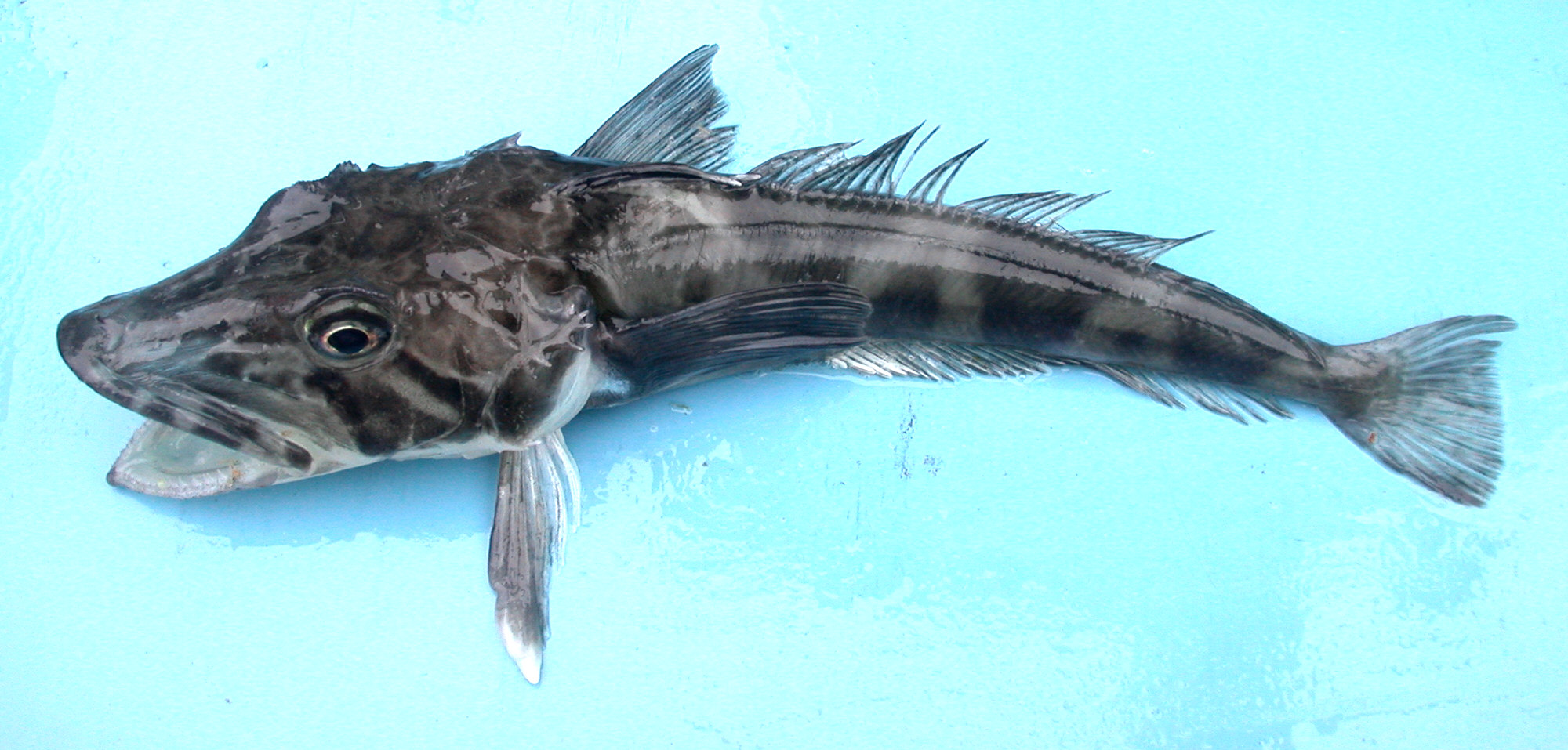
Ocellated Icefish (Chionodraco rastrospinosus) taken close to the South Shetland Islands

Antarctic fishes are a relatively limited but highly specialized group of species adapted to extreme cold in the Southern Ocean. Many belong to the “white-blooded” icefish group, such as the mackerel icefish that lack 'hemoglobin" and thus have colorless blood, a feature that is unique to this region. Other abundant types include ‘Antarctic cods’ though they are not true cods which possess antifreeze glycoproteins in their blood allowing them to survive in waters below the normal freezing point. Large species such as the Antarctic toothfish can grow up to two meters and live for decades, and inhabit depths from 100 meters to 3,000 meters, feeding on fish, squid and benthic crustaceans. Conservation concerns around the toothfish have required international regulation because of historical illegal, unreported and unregulated fishing, which once far exceeded legal catches in the region.

Antarctic fish is a common name for a variety of fish that inhabit the Southern Ocean. There are relatively few families in this region, the most species-rich being the Liparidae (snailfishes), followed by Nototheniidae (cod icefishes). The latter is one of eight different families that belong to the suborder Notothenioidei of the order Perciformes. They are also called notothenioids, but this name is also used to describe the other three, non-Antarctic families and some of the non-Antarctic genera in the mainly Antarctic families belonging to the suborder.

Antarctic fish are best known for their uses in studying adaptive radiation, the ecological process that causes the rapid development of several different species from one common ancestor of this fishes. These studies have been done using genetics, phylogeny, study of paleontology, and combinations of these fields to determine the sister lineage of the Antarctic fish.

== Description ==
=== General ===
Though many different species comprise the Antarctic icefish cluster, there are some common characteristics between fish. They generally have a set of rounded pectoral fins and rounded pelvic fins that maximize mobility in both the water column and on the seafloor. Their eyes are of medium size and are set towards the top of the head, indicating that they catch prey by moving into the water column from the seafloor. The mouth is large in comparison to size of the body. The spiny dorsal fin is placed halfway down the body and is detached from the soft dorsal fin. The soft dorsal fin extends down the body and ends shortly before the caudal fin. The anal fin mirrors the soft dorsal fin down the underside of the body before the caudal fin. The shape of the caudal fin varies based on family, but is generally either rounded, forked or truncate. Only Artedidraconids have chin barbels hanging from the lower jaw that drags through the sand and a hook shaped operculum. Otherwise, the operculum is rounded.

Coloring ranges from light gray to dark gray with large spotting. Some species are tan or green or even red.

Channichthyids are the largest of these fish at a maximum of 75 centimetres (30 in), with Harpagifer the smallest at 10 centimetres (3.9 in).

=== Buoyancy ===
Notothenioid fish dominate the Southern Ocean diversity and biomass largely because of the pelagization by some species. Most fish are benthic and consequently, spend their lives on the seafloor. Notothenioids are found in many different niches like semipelagic, cryopelagic, pelagic, and benthic zones. Species have been able to colonize the water column despite not having swim bladders like other bony fishes. Evolution that decreased the amount of minerals present in the skeleton and increased the number of lipids in the body made this possible. As a result, fish can remain neutrally buoyant and decrease the energy requirement for remaining pelagic. These adaptations are most often observed in Nototheniids, the most diverse of the families. Because of their movement into the water column, fish are observed to feed on both the seafloor and in the water column.

=== Antifreeze glycoproteins ===
Antarctic notothenioids are able to survive the freezing temperatures of −1.86 °C (28.65 °F). with the use of antifreeze glycoproteins (AFGPs). Antifreeze glycoproteins bind to ice that enters the body through ingestion of food, water and from their environment to prevent the organism freezing internally. AFGPs evolved from pancreatic trypsinogen gene for survival as Antarctic waters began to cool. They consist of repeating amino acids alanine-alanine-threonine to effectively bind to ice molecules and render them as non-threatening to survival. AFGPs are created in the pancreas and are released into the digestive tract to wrap around ice crystals so they can be safely excreted with excrement. Unused AFGPs are recycled by entering the bloodstream and cycling back to the liver for storage. Fish also excrete AFGPs in their mucus and on the surface of their skin to prevent external freezing.

AFGPs do not eliminate all internal ice crystals and can instead fill fish with inactivated ice crystals. This can pose as a danger to the organism as well. Research has shown that summer warming of waters does eliminate internal ice somewhat but it does not do so explicitly.

=== Heat shock proteins ===
Heat shock proteins (HSPs) are expressed during exposure to high temperatures and is a characteristic held by most organisms. In some species of nototheniids, this trait is not expressed. The trait is not expressed because of the extreme cold of the Southern Oceans leading to upregulation of Hsp70. HSP expression indicates that regulation of Hsp70 occurred once during speciation, showing that it is a trait of most, if not all Antarctic notothenioids possess.

Some Antarctic fish are able to resist perishing when exposed to temperatures 13–18 °C (55–64 °F) higher than their environment but little research has taken place to explain how they survive.

=== Hemoglobin loss ===
Channichthyids' most well known feature is their lack of erythrocytes. Genetic evidence shows that crocodile icefish had erythrocytes but have back evolved to not use hemoglobin, or any protein binding for oxygen transport. Instead, white-blooded fish have improved heart output, higher blood volume, higher uptake of oxygen and lower metabolic rates. The discovery that icefish species Neopagetopsis ionah possesses a nearly intact, but useless set of globin genes demonstrates that multiple events led to the loss of hemoglobin expression in icefish.

One possible explanation for why icefish were able to survive the mutational events that removed their erythrocytes is that because iron is a limiting element in the oceans, icefish found a way to thrive by not needing it for oxygen transport. One other possible explanation is that colder waters increases the viscosity of body fluids to the point that it is beneficial to eliminate erythrocytes altogether, and instead rely on adaptations. Neither theories have much further research to support their points.

== Distribution ==
Artedidraconids are deep sea dwellers in the Southern Ocean. Bathydraconids are also found in Antarctic deep sea. Channichthyids are distributed around both Antarctica and Southern America. Harpagiferids are found in the Southern Ocean, Southwest Pacific, Southwest Atlantic, and the Indian Ocean. Nototheniids are distributed throughout the coasts of Antarctica.

== Life cycle ==
Notothenioids have a lifespan of an estimated ten years and reach sexual maturity at ages 3–4 years. Notothenioids are thought to spawn annually while sex organ maturation takes place every other year. Spawning generally takes place during fall or winter if taking place in seasonal ice habitats while spawning in Antarctic zones spawn in summer and fall. Some migratory patterns have been observed in a few species in the seasonal ice habitats. Most fish move to shallower waters or areas with sloping continental shelves to spawn.

Eggs are released in batches. Notothenioids are known for nesting and guarding their eggs to ensure protection from predators, improve oxygen content of water around eggs and dispose of dead or damaged eggs. Whether or not these eggs are pelagic or attached to the seafloor, rocks or sponges depends on the species of fish. Crocodile icefish tend to have either eggs attached to the seafloor and with eggs attached to the pelvic fin. Bathydraconids guard eggs on the seafloor of shallow waters. Both harpagiferids and artedidraconids also guard their eggs by attaching them to the seafloor.

Eggs have a long incubation time of around 5 months. The long incubation time can be attributed to the colder waters. Larvae do not hatch until in advanced stages of development. Well developed larvae have higher chances of survival in extreme climates. Once hatched, the larvae have sufficient means to swim and evade predators with long, slender bodies and larval fins. Main predators of the fish larvae are other benthic fish.

== Ecology ==
Adaptive radiation is the rapid speciation of multiple species from a common ancestor to fill empty niches. Evidence of adaptive radiation is common ancestry, early bursts of speciation that decrease with time and a correlation between phenotype and environment. The species flock concept is the phenomena of related species sharing the same habitat. A group of species fit the species flock concept if they exhibit species richness, a common ancestor and share the same area. Species flocks are indicative of adaptive radiation. Antarctic fish fit these criteria with modifications in swim bladders, development of AFGPs, loss of HSPs and modifications in oxygen transport while inhabiting the same geographic area.

Antarctic fish speciation coincides with the separation of Antarctica from Gondwana, a continent composed of Antarctica, Australia, South America and Africa. The temperate, shallow seas hosted a variety of marine life. The close relatives of Antarctic notothenioids, like Halaphritis, Bovichtus, and Pseudaphritis, inhabited these seas. With the cleavage of Australia, South America and Africa from each other, species of marine life separated. As Antarctica cleaved from South America 122 Ma, the Drake Passage formed, fully isolating Antarctica geographically by establishing the Antarctic Circumpolar Current and the Antarctic Polar Front.

The cooling of Antarctica's seas prompted a mass extinction of most of the organisms off the coasts of Antarctica and in the Southern ocean. The mass extinction created many open niches for Antarctic notothenioids to colonize, triggering adaptive radiation. It was originally thought that AFGPs triggered radiation but further research in the timing of AFGP onset and speciation did not support the theory. AFGPs do not fit with the early burst model because they were developed in Antarctic fish 10 Ma before rapid speciation.
