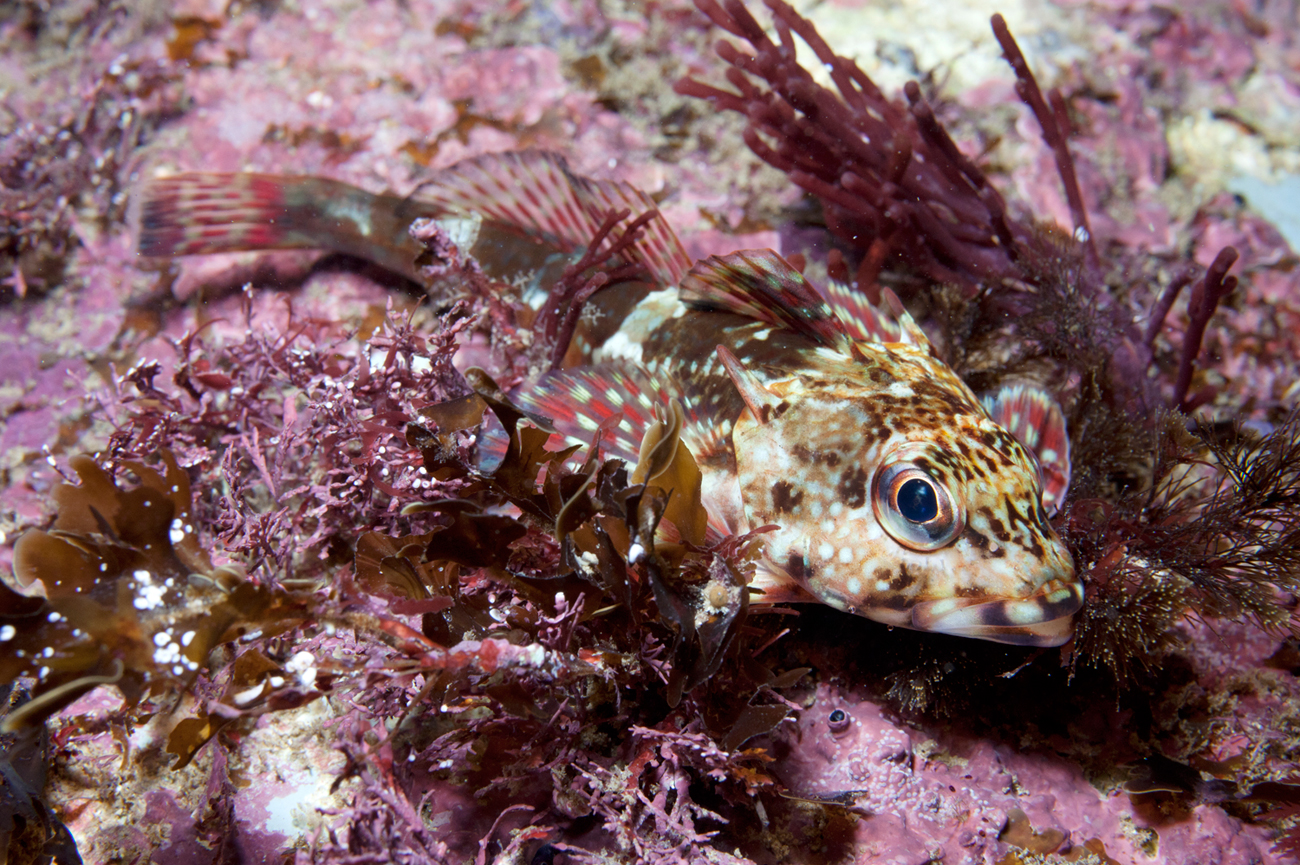
- A Dragonet (Bovichtus angustifrons) in The Arches Marine Sanctuary, Twelve Apostles, Victoria, 2013

Scientific classification
- Kingdom: Animalia
- Phylum: Chordata
- Class: Actinopterygii
- Order: Perciformes
- Family: Bovichtidae
- Genus: Bovichtus
- Species: B. angustifrons

Binomial name
- Bovichtus angustifrons Regan, 1913

= Bovichtus angustifrons =

Species of fish

Bovichtus angustifrons, the dragonet, horny, horny thornfish, marblefish, thornfish or variegated marblefish, is a species of marine ray-finned fish, a temperate icefish or thornfish, belonging to the family Bovichtidae. It is endemic to southeastern Australia and Tasmania on rocky reefs in shallow waters.

== Taxonomy ==
Bovichtus angustifrons was first formally described in 1913 by the British ichthyologist Charles Tate Regan with the type locality given as Tasmania. The specific name angustifrons is a compound of angustus which means narrow and fronsmeaning "front", "face" or "brow", a reference to the narrower space between the eyes in comparison with B. diacanthus and B. variegatus.

== Description ==
Bovichtus angustifrons has a large head and a thick anterior part of the body, the body tapers towards the caudal fin. There is an obvious spine on upper angle on the margin of the operculum and it has large eyes. The pelvic fins are large, originating under and before the pectoral fins. There are no scales. There are 8 spines in the first dorsal fin and 18-19 soft rays in the second dorsal fin while the anal fin has 18 soft rays. This species attains a maximum total length of 28 cm (11 in). It is a camouflaged species which may vary in colour from pale bluish-grey to pale brown with darker mottling, spotting or blotching which is reddish to brown. The juveniles are a drab grey-brown in colour.

== Distribution and habitat ==
Bovichtus angustifrons is endemic southern Australia where it is found from Green Cape in southern New South Wales to about Ceduna in the Great Australian Bight on the coast of South Australia. It is also found around Tasmania. It occurs on shallow rocky reefs and is frequently observed in tidepools and around the pylons of jetties. It lives at depths down to 15 m (49 ft).
