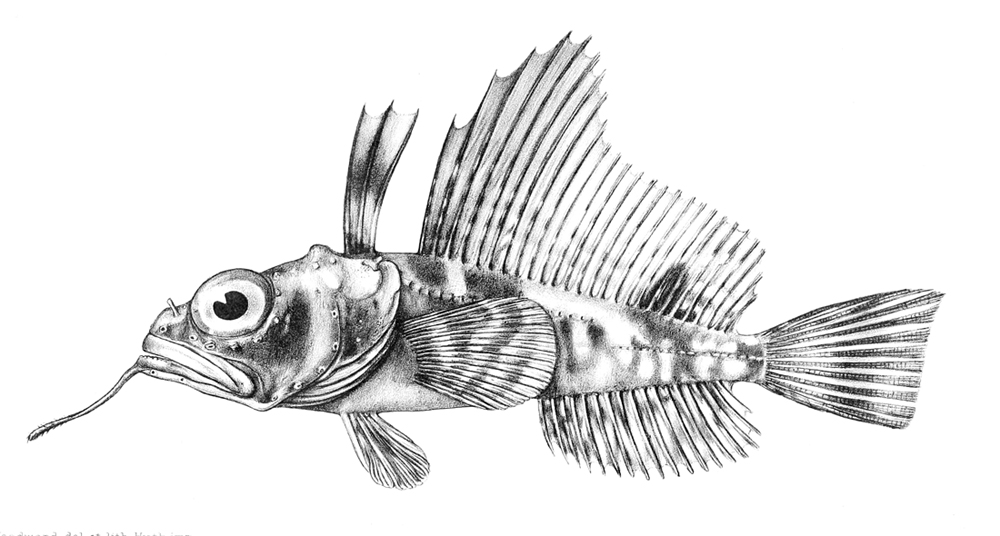

Scientific classification
- Kingdom: Animalia
- Phylum: Chordata
- Class: Actinopterygii
- Order: Perciformes
- Family: Harpagiferidae
- Subfamily: Artedidraconinae
- Genus: Histiodraco; Regan, 1914
- Species: H. velifer

Binomial name
- Histiodraco velifer (Regan, 1914)

Synonyms
- Dolloidraco velifer Regan, 1914

= Histiodraco =

Species of fish

Histiodraco is a monotypic genus of marine ray-finned fish, its only known species being Histiodraco velifer, belonging to the subfamily Artedidraconinae, the barbeled plunderfishes. It is native to the Southern Ocean and the waters around Antarctica.

== Taxonomy ==
The English ichthyologist Charles Tate Regan recognised Histiodraco as a distinct genus for the first time in 1914. In 1914, Regan described a fish collected on the Terra Nova Expedition led by Captain Robert Falcon Scott under the name Dolloidraco velifer, with the type locality given as McMurdo Sound. However, later that year, he described the new genus Histiodraco for D. velifer, this species becoming the type species of that genus by monotypy. The generic name is a compound of histion, which means "sail", and draco, which is likely a reference to the genus Dolloidraco, to which Regan had originally assigned this species and then proposed this genus shortly after describing its sole member. The specific name is also a compound, this time of velum, which again means "sail" and fero, meaning "to bear", both names alluding to the very high soft rayed part of the dorsal fin.

== Description ==
Histiodraco has a first dorsal fin, which contains 2-3 spines and is located over the operculum; the second dorsal fin contains 23-26 soft rays; and the anal fin has 15-18 soft rays. The pectoral fin contains 18-21 fin rays. The head has a width which is roughly the same as its depth, and the post-temporal ridges are well developed. The snout is shorter than the diameter of the eye, and the space between the eyes is narrow. The mental barbel, the barbel on the chin which characterises the barbeled plunderfishes is long and expanded towards its tip, with tapered processes. The upper lateral line has tubed scales at the head end, and towards the caudal fin it normally has disc shaped-scales; the middle lateral line consists of disc-shaped scales with some tubed scales towards the rear. This species attains a maximum total length of 19.1 cm (7.5 in). Histiodraco appears more closely related to Pogonophryne than to Artedidraco but differs on its less depressed head and high second dorsal fin.

== Distribution, habitat and biology ==
Histiodraco is found in the Southern Ocean, where it has been recorded from eastern Antarctica in the Weddell Sea, MacRobertson Land, the Ross Sea, and South Victoria Land. It is a bathydemersal species which is found at depths of 210 to 667 m (689 to 2,188 ft) in the sublittoral and continental shelf. Little is known about this species biology.
