= Harpagifer georgianus =

Scientific classification
- Kingdom: Animalia
- Phylum: Chordata
- Class: Actinopterygii
- Order: Perciformes
- Family: Harpagiferidae
- Genus: Harpagifer
- Species: H. georgianus

Binomial name
- Harpagifer georgianus Nybelin, 1947

Species of fish

Harpagifer georgianus, the South Georgia spiny plunderfish, is a species of ray-finned fish within the family Harpagiferidae, that can grow up to 7 centimeters in length. The species is found in the Southern Ocean off South Georgia and Macquarie Island, at depths up to 90 meters in demersal environments lying motionless. It mainly eats amphipods, but isopods and polychaetes are also consumed.
