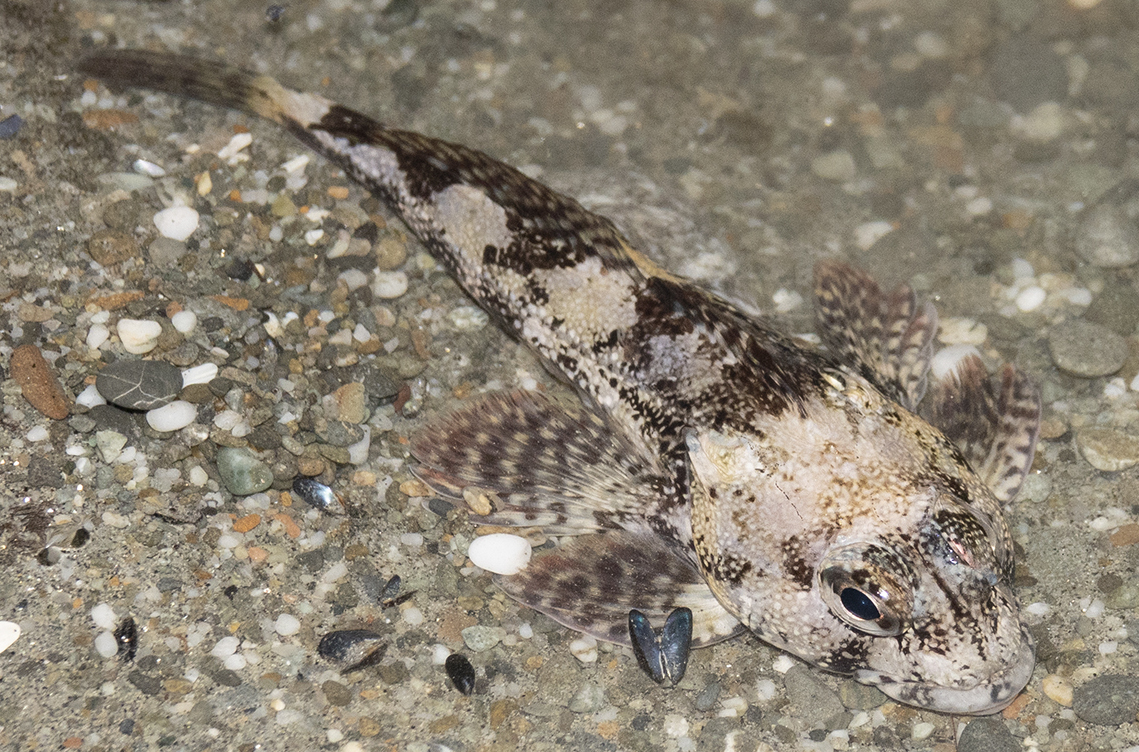

Scientific classification
- Kingdom: Animalia
- Phylum: Chordata
- Class: Actinopterygii
- Order: Perciformes
- Family: Bovichtidae
- Genus: Bovichtus
- Species: B. variegatus

Binomial name
- Bovichtus variegatus J. Richardson, 1846

= Bovichtus variegatus =

Species of fish

Bovichtus variegatus, commonly known as the thornfish, is a species of marine ray-finned fish belonging to the family Bovichtidae, the temperate icefishes or thornfishes. It is endemic to New Zealand.

== Taxonomy ==
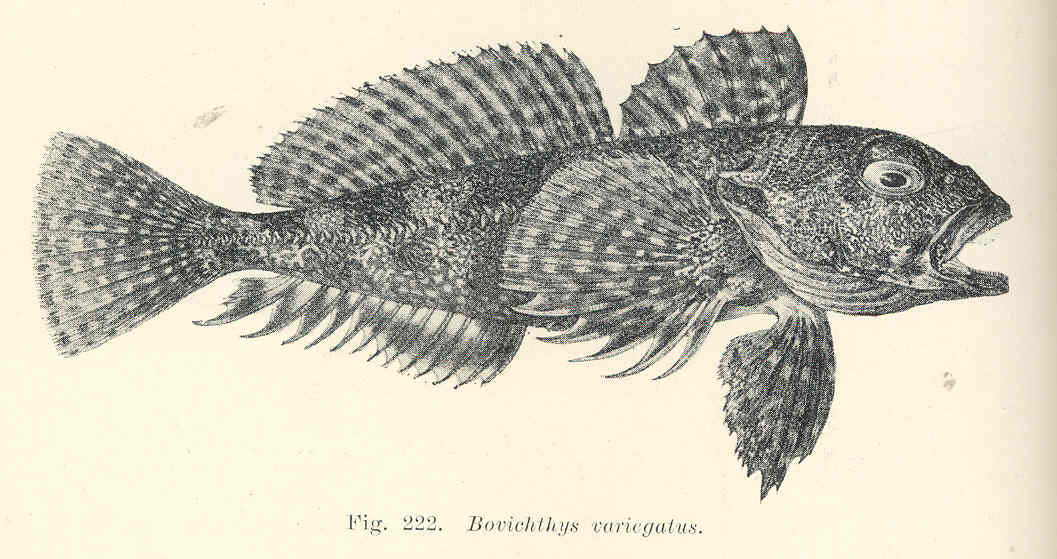
Diagram by Edgar Ravenswood Waite (1921)

Bovichtus variegatus was first formally described in 1846 by the Scottish naval surgeon, naturalist and Arctic explorer Sir John Richardson with the type locality given as Port Jackson in New South Wales, probably erroneously because this species has not been recorded in Australia since. The specific name variegatus means "variable" and was given to emphasise how the markings of this fish differ from those of B. diacanthus.

== Description ==
Bovichtus variegatus has a body which is completely lacking scales with a broad, flattened head. They have large, upward pointing eyes and a broad mouth. They have a robust upward and backwards pointing spine on each gill cover to the rear of the eyes. There is a double dorsal fin, the first one is short and spiny, the number of spines being between 7 and 9, although 8 is most frequent count, while the second dorsal fin contains 18-20 soft rays. The anal fin contains13-15 soft rays. The rays of the pelvic, pectoral and anal fins are robust and the fishes use them as props when resting on a substrate. The colour of the fins and the body is variable and they may be mottled with red, green, orange, pink and white patches on a background colour which varies from olive brown to silvery red. This species grows to 15 to 25 cm (5.9 to 9.8 in) in length.

== Distribution and habitat ==
Bovichtus variegatus is endemic to New Zealand where it is found from the southern coasts of the North Island with its northern limits at New Plymouth on the west coast and Tokomaru Bay on the east coast south to the Auckland Islands. Thornfishes are common in tidal pools and on rocky reefs in shallow waters, particularly in the more southerly parts of its range. It has been recorded no deeper than 9 m (30 ft).

== Biology ==
Bovichtus variegatus is a predatory species, preying on crustaceans and worms. Its mottled colour pattern appears to be a very effective camouflage in its tidal pool habitat.
