= H. velifer =

H. velifer may refer to:

- Haplochromis velifer, a fish species
- Histiodraco velifer, a fish species
