= Harpagifer nybelini =

Scientific classification
- Kingdom: Animalia
- Phylum: Chordata
- Class: Actinopterygii
- Order: Perciformes
- Family: Harpagiferidae
- Genus: Harpagifer
- Species: H. nybelini

Binomial name
- Harpagifer nybelini Prirodina, 2002

Species of fish

Harpagifer nybelini is a species of ray-finned fish within the family Harpagiferidae. The species is found around Kerguelen Islands at depths up to 64 meters.
