= C22orf31 =

Protein-coding gene in the species Homo sapiens

Identifiers
- Aliases: C22orf31, HS747E2A, bK747E2.1, chromosome 22 open reading frame 31
- External IDs: HomoloGene: 81840; GeneCards: C22orf31; OMA:C22orf31 - orthologs

Gene location (Human)
| Chr. | Chromosome 22 (human) |
| Band | 22q12.1 | Start | 29,058,672 bp |
| Band | 22q12.1 | End | 29,061,831 bp |
RNA expression pattern
| Bgee | Human / Mouse (ortholog); Top expressed in: testicle; pancreatic ductal cell; sperm; right testis; left testis; buccal mucosa cell; putamen; external globus pallidus; caudate nucleus; nucleus accumbens / n/a; More reference expression data |
| BioGPS | n/a |
Orthologs
| Species | Human | Mouse |
| Entrez | 25770 | n/a |
| Ensembl | ENSG00000100249 | n/a |
| UniProt | O95567 | n/a |
| RefSeq (mRNA) | NM_015370; NM_001386866 | n/a |
| RefSeq (protein) | NP_056185 | n/a |
| Location (UCSC) | Chr 22: 29.06 – 29.06 Mb | n/a |
| PubMed search | | n/a |
- Wikidata
| View/Edit Human |

C22orf31 (chromosome 22, open reading frame 31) is a protein which in humans is encoded by the C22orf31 gene. The C22orf31 mRNA transcript has an upstream in-frame stop codon, while the protein has a domain of unknown function (DUF4662) spanning the majority of the protein-coding region. The protein has orthologs with high percent similarity in mammals. The most distant orthologs are found in species of bony fish, but C22orf31 is not found in any species of birds or amphibians.

Similar to many proteins, C22orf31 is found to be highly expressed in the testes. Analysis of in vivo mature oocytes has revealed increased levels of C22orf31 while promoter analysis has identified transcription factors for C22orf31 that are active during myeloid cell differentiation.

== Gene ==
C22orf31 is located on the minus strand of chromosome 22 at 20q12.1. The gene is 3,172 base pairs long and spans from chr22: 29,058,672 to 29,061,844. C22orf31 contains 3 exons and is also known by the aliases BK747E2.1 and HS747E2A.

== Transcript ==
There is one transcript of C22orf31. The mRNA sequence is 1,070 base pairs long and contains an upstream in-frame stop codon from nucleotide 122–124.

== Protein ==
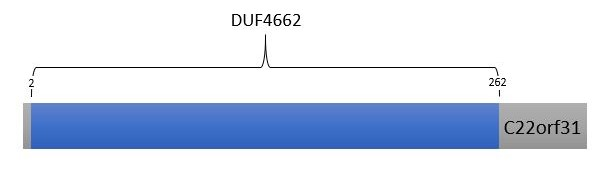
Domain of unknown function (DUF4662) in Human C22orf31 protein.

=== General properties ===
The protein encoded by C22orf31 is 290 amino acids in length with a predicted molecular mass of 33kDa. The isoelectric point of the protein is 10, indicating that the pH of the protein is basic. The C22orf31 protein contains a domain of unknown function (DUF4662) from amino acid 2 – 263. The secondary and tertiary structure of this protein is not well known.

=== Isoforms ===
C22orf31 has two protein isoforms. A comparison of these isoforms is shown in the table below.

C22orf31 Isoforms
| Protein | Accession # | Size (AA) | Features |
|---|---|---|---|
| C22orf31 [Homo sapiens] | NP_056185 | 290 | DUF4662 (AA 2-263) |
| Uncharacterized protein C22orf31 isoform X1 [Homo sapiens] | XP_016884230 | 249 | DUF4662 (AA 1-221) |
| Uncharacterized protein C22orf31 isoform X2 [Homo sapiens] | XP_005261548 | 186 | DUF4662 (AA 40-158) |

=== Composition ===
The protein derived from C22orf31 is considered somewhat rich in lysine and somewhat poor in phenylalanine compared to the composition of the average human protein. There are no positive, negative, mixed, or uncharged segments in C22orf31. There are also no transmembrane components or signal peptides in the protein.

== Regulation ==
=== Gene level regulation ===
==== Transcription factor binding sites ====
The C22orf31 promoter has many transcription factor binding sites. C22orf31's transcription factors are commonly found in immortalized liver cancer cell lines (HepG2) and immortalized myelogenous leukemia cell lines (K562). The presence of C/EBP epsilon suggests a role for C22orf31 in myeloid cell differentiation. The presence of ARNT, which is typically associated with hypoxia-inducible factor 1 alpha, suggests a role for C22orf31 in the formation of acute myeloblastic leukemia.

==== Expression ====
C22orf31 has been found to have moderate expression in the testes and low amounts of expression in the brain and ovaries. The protein is also expressed in fetal tissue as well as adult tissues. C22orf31 has been seen to have increased conditional expression in vivo matured oocytes in comparison to metaphase II oocytes.

=== Transcript level regulation ===
There are no microRNA binding sites found in C22orf31. Three functionally important stem loops are predicted in both the 3' UTR and 5' UTR of C22orf31.

=== Protein Level Regulation ===
Conceptual translation of C22orf31 including post-translational modifications, domains, and other features.

C22orf31 is predicted to undergo several types of post-translational modifications. With a high degree of certainty, it is predicted that C22orf31 undergoes O-glycosylation, glycation, phosphorylation, and O-GlcNAcylation. Only two phosphorylation sites are located in highly conserved regions of the protein. These modifications can be seen in the conceptual translation on the right.

== Homology/evolution ==
=== Paralogs ===
No human paralogs for C22orf31 have been identified.

=== Orthologs ===
Orthologs of the C22orf31 protein exist predominantly in mammals. However, the most distant orthologs are found in bony fish, with no orthologs being identified in amphibians or birds. Some of the major taxon groups that C22orf31 orthologs belong to include: bovidae, eulipotyphyla, cetacea, diprotodontia, vertebrata, and rodentia.

A list of 20 C22orf31 orthologs can be seen below, organized first by ascending date of divergence and second by descending percent identity with human C22orf31.

C22orf31 Orthologs
| Genus species | Common Name | Taxon | Date of Divergence (MYA) | Accession # | Length (AA) | % identity w/ human | % similarity w/ human |
| Homo sapiens | Human | Homonidae | 0 | NP_056185.1 | 290 | 100 | 100 |
| Miniopterus natalensis | Natal Long-fingered Bat | Chiroptera | 94 | XP_016054130.1 | 301 | 78.45 | 82.1 |
| Physeter catodon | Sperm whale | Cetacea | 94 | XP_023976708.1 | 307 | 75.68 | 78.8 |
| Bison bison bison | Bison | Bovidae | 94 | XP_010827019.1 | 292 | 75 | 79.5 |
| Mustela putorius furo | Domestic ferret | Mustelidae | 94 | XP_012918895.1 | 395 | 73.31 | 60.4 |
| Ovis aries | Sheep | Bovidae | 94 | XP_027836065.1 | 315 | 73.2 | 72.7 |
| Suricata suricatta | Meerkat | Carnivora | 94 | XP_029777390.1 | 296 | 72.39 | 81.1 |
| Manis javanica | Malayan pangolin | Manidae | 94 | XP_017520770.1 | 302 | 72.3 | 78.2 |
| Lagenorhynchus obliquidens | Pacific white-sided dolphin | Cetacea | 94 | XP_026981083.1 | 307 | 71.14 | 76 |
| Orcinus orca | Killer whale | Cetacea | 94 | XP_004283847.1 | 271 | 68.62 | 72.6 |
| Globicephala melas | Long-finned pilot whale | Cetacea | 94 | XP_030715704.1 | 287 | 68.28 | 74.1 |
| Neophocaena asiaeorientalis | Yangtze finless porpoise | Cetacea | 94 | XP_024623713.1 | 324 | 66.04 | 70.2 |
| Sorex araneus | European shrew | Eulipotyphla | 94 | XP_004615674.1 | 325 | 64.11 | 63.1 |
| Condylura cristata | Star-nosed mole | Rodentia | 94 | XP_004690724.1 | 347 | 62.54 | 59.2 |
| Loxodonta africana | African bush elephant | Paenungulates | 102 | XP_023415096.1 | 536 | 78.52 | 46.6 |
| Chrysochloris asiatica | Cape golden mole | Rodentia | 102 | XP_006869362.1 | 460 | 77.7 | 53.9 |
| Dasypus novemcinctus | Nine-banded armadillo | Xenarthrans | 102 | XP_023445504.1 | 305 | 75.44 | 79 |
| Echinops telfairi | Small Madagascar hedgehog | Eulipotyphla | 102 | XP_012863338.2 | 300 | 68.01 | 73.4 |
| Phascolarctos cinereus | Koala | Diprotodontia | 160 | XP_020852397.1 | 302 | 49.19 | 60.8 |
| Vombatus ursinus | Common wombat | Diprotodontia | 160 | XP_027718888.1 | 378 | 48.87 | 48.8 |
| Myripristis murdjan | Pinecone soldierfish | Vertebrata | 433 | XP_029922652.1 | 184 | 48.98 | 27 |
| Cottoperca gobio | Cottoperca | Vertebrata | 433 | XP_029301846.1 | 171 | 34.04 | 22.4 |
| Astyanax mexicanus | Mexican tetra | Vertebrata | 433 | XP_022533372.1 | 208 | 26.36 | 26.3 |

=== Divergence ===
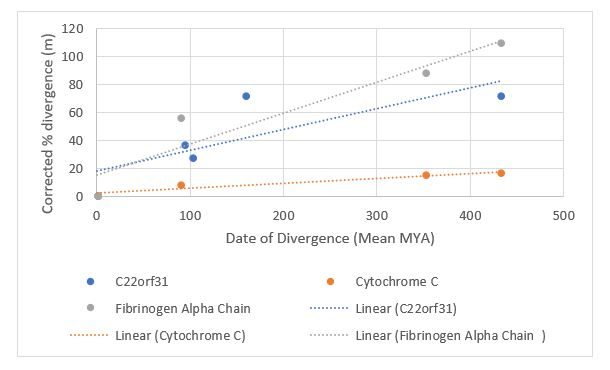
Corrected percent divergence of protein orthologs from C22orf31, cytochrome c, and fibrinogen alpha chain over time.

When compared to other proteins, namely fibrinogen alpha chain and cytochrome c, C22orf31 is a moderately evolving protein. This was determined by calculating the corrected percent divergence, using molecular clock equations, of different orthologs for each protein in comparison to their date of divergence. A physical representation of this information can be seen in the divergence graph on the right.

== Interacting Proteins ==
C22orf31 interacts physically with 3 different proteins, according to the BioGRID, Mentha, and IntAct protein interaction browsers. In particular, C22orf31 interacts with two histone deacetylases (HDAC1 and HDAC2) and the protein Lacritin (LACRT). These interactions were determined using high-throughput affinity-purification mass spectrometry A biochemical association has also been determined through protein microarray between C22orf31 and F-box protein 7 (FBOX7). All of these proteins, with additional information, are shown in the table below.

C22orf31 Interacting Proteins
| Protein Name | Abbreviation | Interaction Type | Score | Interaction Detection Method |
| Histone deacetylase 1 | HDAC1 | Physical association | 0.9017 | Affinity chromatography |
| Histone deacetylase 2 | HDAC2 | Physical association | 0.9213 | Affinity chromatography |
| Lacritin | LACRT | Physical association | 0.9886 | Affinity chromatography |
| F-box protein 7 | FBOX7 | Biochemical association | - | Protein microarray |

The score for each protein in the table refers to the level of confidence of the prediction protein interaction with C22orf31 on a scale from 0–1, 1 being more confident.

== Clinical significance ==
=== Pathology ===
Increased in vivo expression of C22orf31 in mature oocytes suggests that the gene plays a role in oocyte development.

=== Disease ===
The predicted transcription factor binding sites of C22orf31 could possibly suggest a role for the gene in myeloid cell differentiation and the formation of acute myeloblastic leukemia.
