= Victoria Metcalf =

New Zealand Antarctic researcher

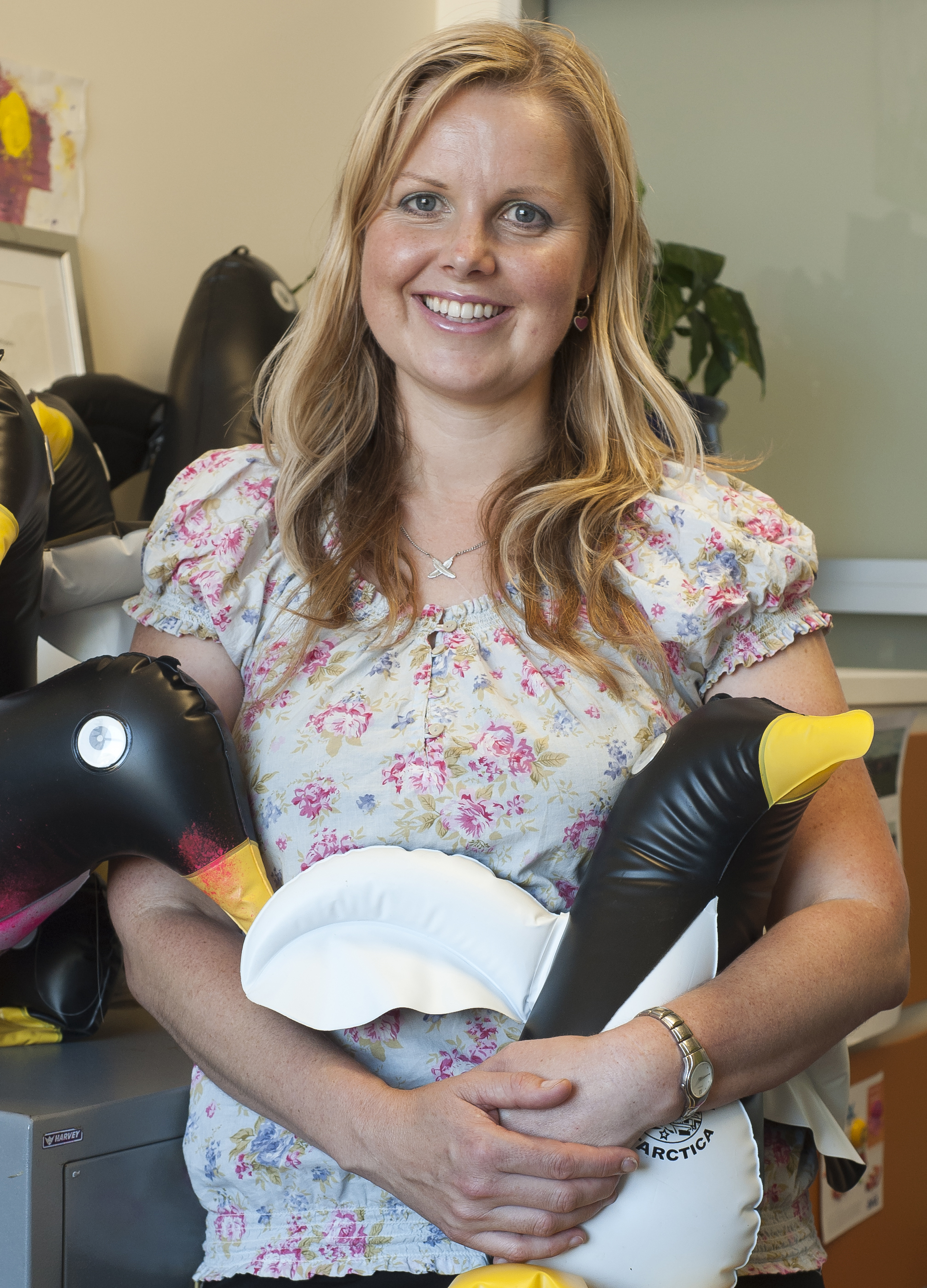
- Education: University of Otago
- Scientific career
- Fields: Polar biology
- Workplaces: Lincoln University

Victoria Metcalf is an Antarctic researcher based in New Zealand, best known for her work on Antarctic fishes and invertebrates. She was awarded the 2006 Zonta Science Award.

She is also a science communicator, with experience in public and citizen science, and an advocate for equity, diversity and inclusion in STEM.

Metcalf is currently a Strategic Advisor on External Engagement to the New Zealand Royal Society Te Apārangi.

== Early life and education ==
Metcalf was born in Christchurch, New Zealand, and moved to Invercargill when she was 4. She graduated in 1996 with a BSc(Hons) First Class in Biochemistry, University of Otago. In 2002 she completed her PhD in Biochemistry at Christchurch School of Medicine, University of Otago.

== Career and impact ==
Metcalf is a marine biologist and geneticist. Metcalf’s research focused on fish and shellfish, mainly Antarctic marine life although this extends in some cases to New Zealand marine species.

She has made seven trips to the Antarctic and has been researching Antarctic fish and invertebrates since 1998. she also has interest in New Zealand aquaculture species, and is researching how key species have adapted to their environment and the potential impacts of warming temperatures, ocean acidification and pollution.

From 2008 to 2014, she was a lecturer at Lincoln University in New Zealand.

This was followed by a five-year appointment (2015-2020) as the National Coordinator of the Participatory Science Platform, Office of the Prime Minister's Chief Science Advisor. The flagship Participatory Science Platform. seeks to engage communities and scientists in working together on locally meaningful projects, including those involving Citizen Science.

== Awards and honours ==
- 2006 Zonta Prize for Women in Science.
