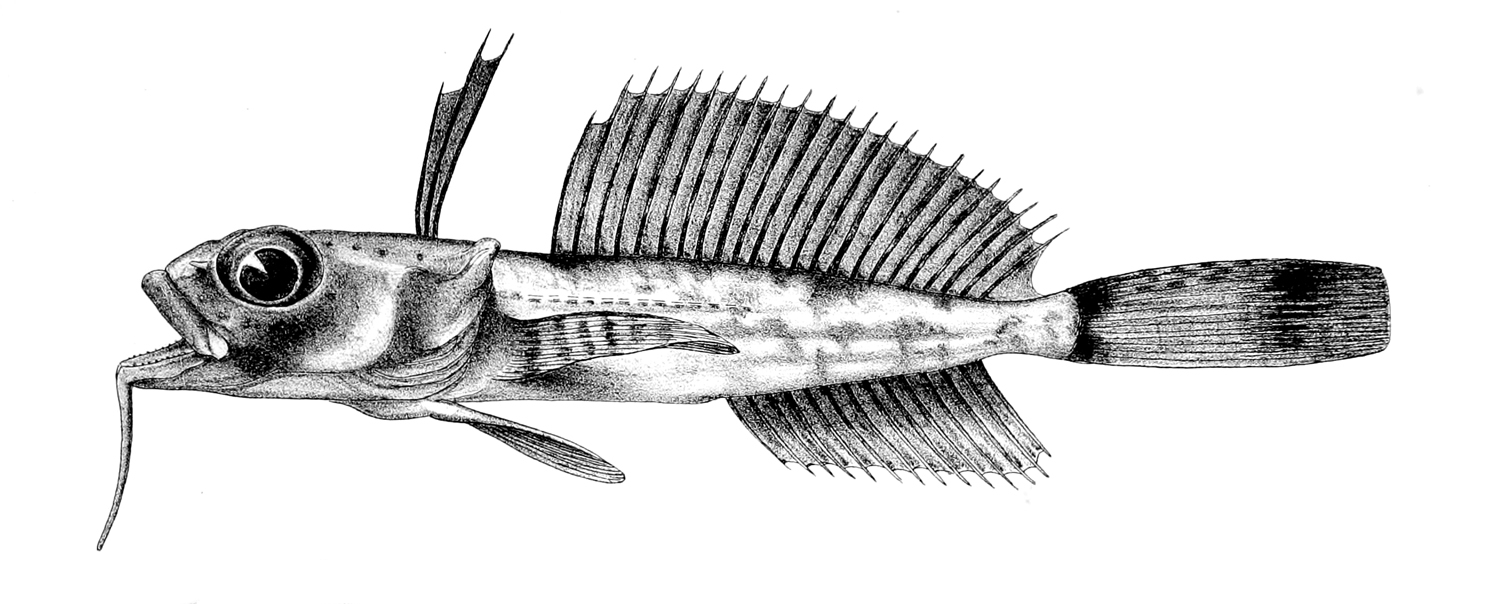
- Lateral view
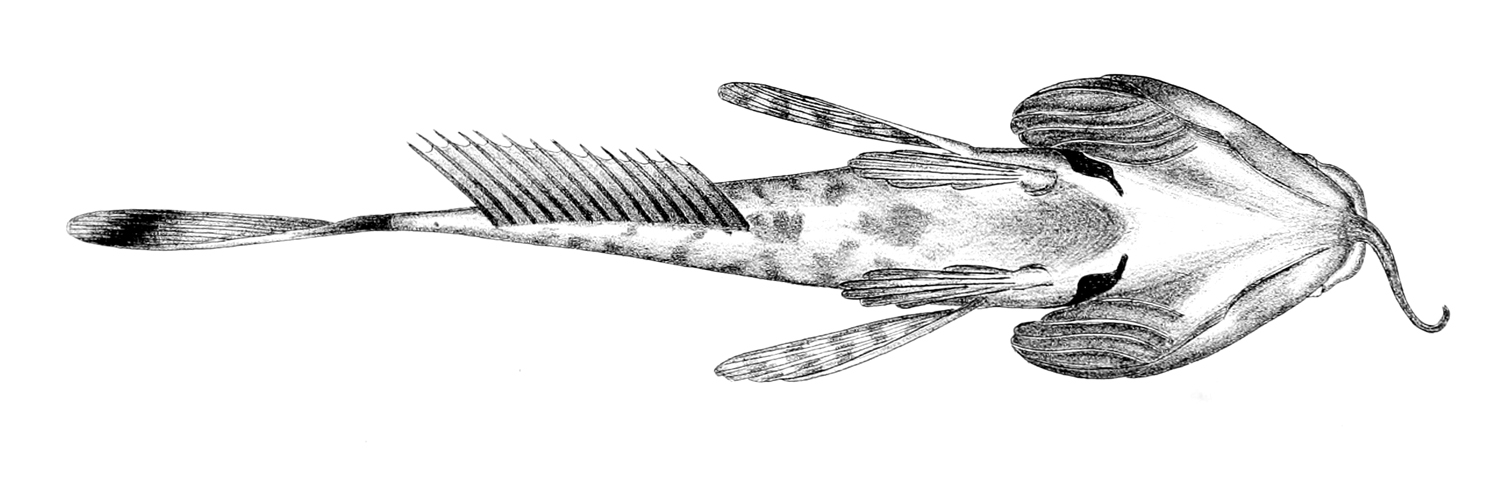
- Ventral view

Scientific classification
- Kingdom: Animalia
- Phylum: Chordata
- Class: Actinopterygii
- Order: Perciformes
- Family: Harpagiferidae
- Subfamily: Artedidraconinae
- Genus: Dolloidraco; Roule, 1913
- Species: D. longedorsalis

Binomial name
- Dolloidraco longedorsalis Roule, 1913

= Dolloidraco =

Species of fish

Dolloidraco is a monotypic genus of marine ray-finned fish, its only known species being Dolloidraco longedorsalis, belonging to the subfamily Artedidraconinae, the barbeled plunderfishes. It is native to the Southern Ocean in the waters around Antarctica.

== Taxonomy ==
Dolloidraco was first formally described as a genus in 1913 by the French zoologist Louis Roule in his description of D. longedorsalis which had been collected on the French Antarctic Expedition led by Jean-Baptiste Charcot from 1904-1907. The type locality was given as Marguerite Bay and Jenny Island on the Antarctic Peninsula. The generic name compounds Dollo, honouring the Belgian paleontologist Louis Dollo who published on Antarctic fishes, with draco, a reference to the related genus Artedidraco. The specific name is a compound of longi which means "long" and dorsalis meaning "dorsal". Roule did not explain this but it may be a reference to this taxon's taller, but not longer, dorsal fin in comparison with Artedidraco.

== Description ==
Dolloidraco has a first dorsal fin which contains 3-4 spines and is located over the operculum, the second dorsal fin contains 22-25 soft rays while the anal fin has 14-16 soft rays. The caudal fin has 8-10 branched rays and the pectoral fin contains 16-18 fin rays. The head has a width which is roughly the same as their depth and the post temporal ridges are weakly developed. The snout is shorter than the diameter of the eye and the space between the eyes is narrow. The mental barbel, the barbel on the chin which characterises the barbeled plunderfishes, is tapered or expanded towards its tip. The upper lateral line has tubed scales at the head end and towards the caudal fin it normally has disc shaped scales, the middle lateral line consist of disc-shaped scales. This species attains a maximum total length of 13.7 cm (5.4 in).

== Distribution, habitat and biology ==
Dolloidraco is found in the Southern Ocean where it has been recorded from the Weddell Sea, Graham Land, Queen Mary Land and south Victoria Land. It is a bathydemersal species which is found at depths of 203 to 1,145 m (666 to 3,757 ft) in the sublittoral and continental shelf. Their diet is dominated by errant polychaetes with gammaridean amphipods, isopods, sedentary polychaetes, and unidentified polychaetes eaten as secondary items. Calanoid copepods, unidentified crustaceans, cumaceans, hydroids, and mysids are consumed but are not important parts of the diet.
