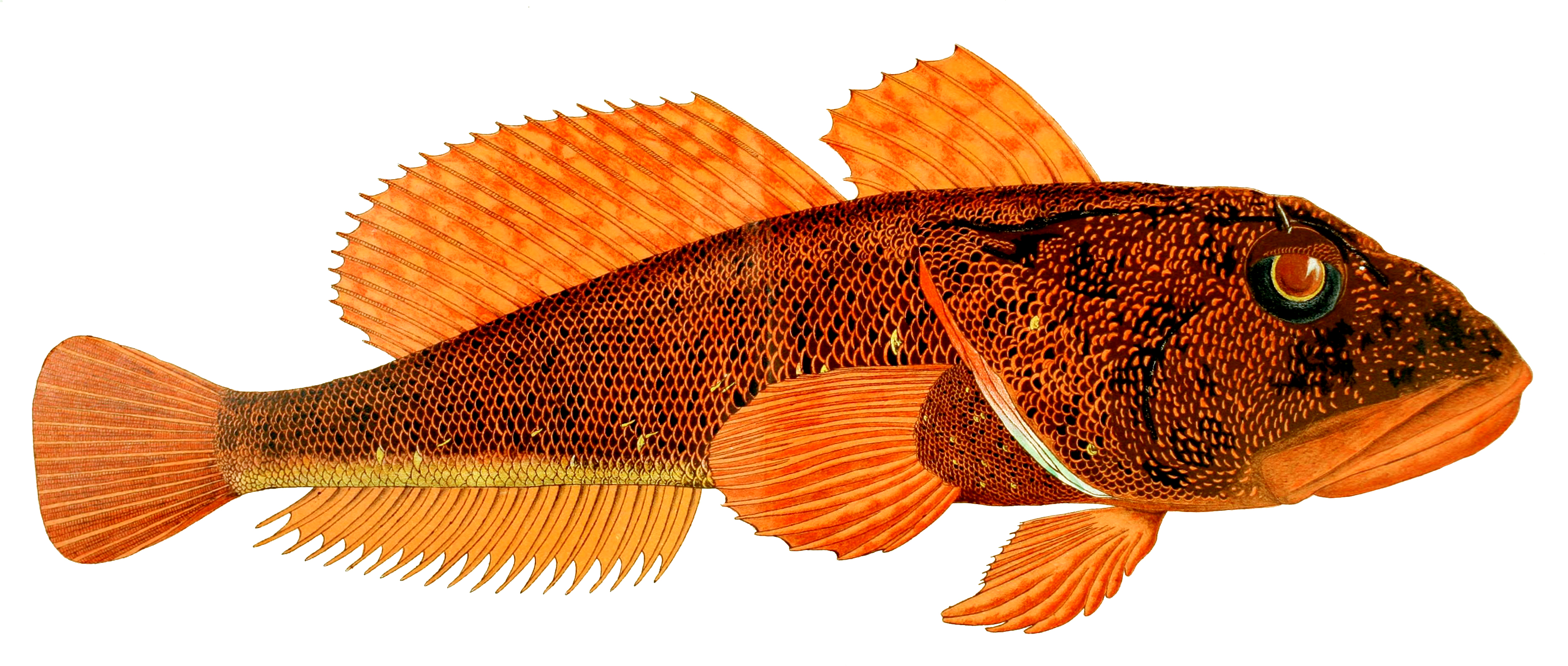
- Channel Bull Blenny (C. gobio)

Scientific classification
- Kingdom: Animalia
- Phylum: Chordata
- Class: Actinopterygii
- Order: Perciformes
- Family: Bovichtidae
- Genus: Cottoperca; Steindachner, 1875

Type species
- Cottoperca rosenbergii Steindachner, 1875

= Cottoperca =

Genus of fishes

Cottoperca is a genus of marine ray-finned fishes belonging to the family Bovichtidae, the temperate icefishes or thornfishes. They are found in the southeastern Pacific, southwestern Atlantic and northern Southern Oceans off southern South America.

== Taxonomy ==
Cottoperca was first formally described as a genus in 1875 by the Austrian ichthyologist Franz Steindachner with Cottoperca rosenbergii which Steindachner described as its only species. C. rosenbergii was later found to be a synonym of Batrachus trigloides which had been described by the German naturalist Johann Reinhold Forster in 1801. Some taxonomic authorities consider that Cottoperca is monotypic and that the only valid species is C. gobio, while others state the only valid species is C. trigloides, although this is not the position taken by the 5th edition of Fishes of the World, World Register of Marine Species, FishBase or the Catalog of Fishes, which all give the genus 2 species. The genus name is made up from cottus, meaning "sculpin" and perca which means "perch", an allusion Steindachner did not explain but which is probably a reference to the sculpin like shape of C. rosenbergii.

== Species ==
There are currently two recognized species in this genus:

- Cottoperca gobio (Günther, 1861) (Channel bull blenny)
- Cottoperca trigloides (J. R. Forster, 1801) (Frogmouth)

== Characteristics ==
Cottoperca species are larger than the related Bovichtus species, with a maximum total length of 80 cm (31 in), and unlike them they are clothed in scales. The large head is bony with only weak spines on the operculum. There is a small fleshy tentacle above each eye. Like Bovichtus they have robust lower fin rays on the pelvic fin as an adaptation for gripping onto the substrate.

== Distribution and habitat ==
Cottoperca fishes are found in the waters off the southern cone of South America in the southwestern Atlantic around Cape Horn and Tierra de Fuego into the southeastern Pacific Ocean. Their range extends as far north as 41°S and south to 54°S. They can be found in shallow waters as well as in water that is hundreds of metres deep, although they are typically found at depths of 100 to 150 m (330 to 490 ft).

== Biology ==
Cottoperca fishes are benthic ambush predators, feeding mostly on fish, small crustaceans and some algae. They have a high reproductive capacity and rates of growth which have enabled them to live on a large area of the Patagonian Shelf Studies performed in the Beagle Channel indicated that C. trigloides lives around the holdfasts in kelp forests dominated by Macrocystis pyrifera. Although most of the prey of these fishes is benthic they are known to eat large amounts of the nectonic herring Sprattus fuegensis. They lay egg masses which stick to the substrated. They are known to live for at least 8 years.

== Fisheries and conservation ==
Cottoperca are not utilized, but they commonly discarded as bycatch in hake and shrimp fisheries. This bycatch is not thought to threaten the population of C. trigloides which is classed as Least Concern by the IUCN.
