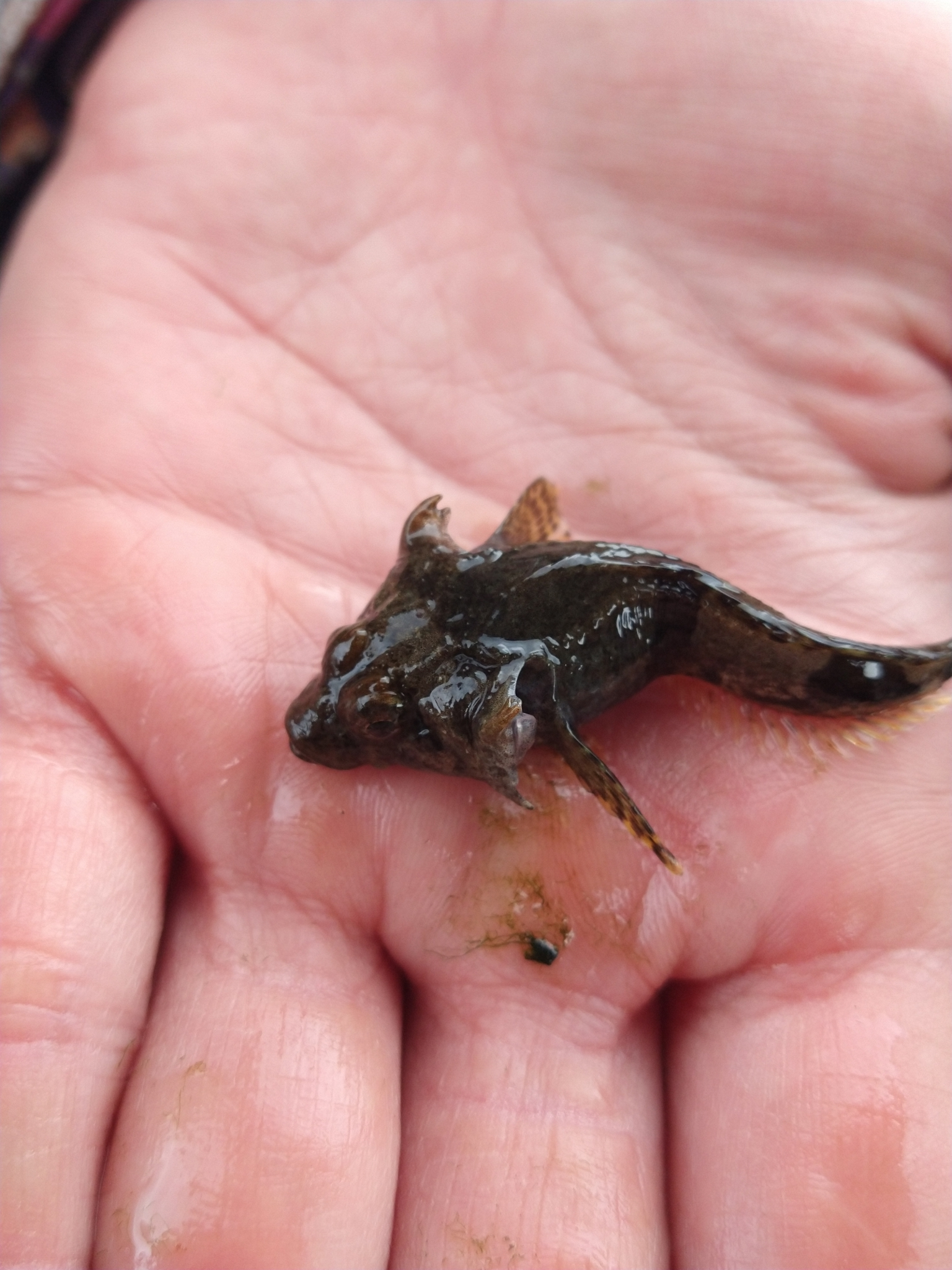

Conservation status
- Least Concern (IUCN 3.1)

Scientific classification
- Kingdom: Animalia
- Phylum: Chordata
- Class: Actinopterygii
- Division: Teleostei
- Order: Perciformes
- Family: Harpagiferidae
- Genus: Harpagifer
- Species: H. bispinis

Binomial name
- Harpagifer bispinis (Forster, 1801)

Synonyms
- Batrachus bispinis Forster, 1801

= Harpagifer bispinis =

Species of ray-finned fish

Harpagifer bispinis, the Magellan plunderfish, is a species of ray-finned fish within the family Harpagiferidae. The species is found in the south Pacific and south Atlantic around the Straits of Megellan, south of Chile and Argentina. Other areas it is found near around this range include Patagonia, the Falkland Islands, Isla de los Estas, and some subantarctic islands.

== Biology & ecology ==
Harpagifer bispinis is a demersal fish, mainly inhabiting shallow inshore waters up to 50 metres (160 ft) below sea level, often occurring in tide pools, under rocks, and among kelp feeding on small crustaceans. The species has been recorded to reach a maximum length of 10 centimetres (3.9 in), however most individuals are found less than 7 centimetres (2.8 in) in length. Females guard eggs that are deposited in a nest constructed for a 4 month incubation period. It is an important ecological prey item for animals such as sea birds and penguins.

== Conservation ==
Harpagifer bispinis has been classified as a 'Least concern' species by the IUCN Red List as despite its small range, it is common and abundant with no known major threats. It may be consumed by the Chinook salmon which is invasive within its range, however this is not thought to be a major threat to the species population. No species-specific conservation measures have been made towards the fish.
