= Flathead congoli =

Scientific classification
- Kingdom: Animalia
- Phylum: Chordata
- Class: Actinopterygii
- Division: Teleostei
- Order: Perciformes
- Family: Bovichtidae
- Genus: Halaphritis; Last, Balushkin & Hutchins, 2002
- Species: H. platycephala

Binomial name
- Halaphritis platycephala Last, Balushkin & Hutchins, 2002

Species of fish

The flathead congoli (Halaphritis platcephala) is a species of marine ray-finned fish, belonging to the family Bovichtidae, the thornfishes or temperate icefishes. It is native to the seas off southeastern Australia. This species is the only known member of its genus.

== Taxonomy ==
The flathead congoli was first formally described in 2002 by Peter R. Last, Arkadii Vladimirovich Balushkin and J. Barry Hutchins with the type locality given as Port Davey, Tasmania. It is the only species in the monotypic genus Halaphritis. The name of the genus Halaphritis is a compound of halos meaning "sea" and aphritis which is a name which dates back to Aristotle, who used it for a type of anchovy or whitebait, but the authors used as an allusion to Pseudaphritis, emphasising this species marine habitat compared to the superficially similar congoli (Pseudaphritis urvillii), a predominantly fresh and brackish water species. The specific name platycephala means "flat head" alluding to the flattened head of this species.

== Description ==
The flathead congoli has a flattened, elongate and shallow body, its depth being around 15% of its standard length. The head is quite large having its length being around 31% of the standard length and is highly flattened and has a wide rounded snout. The large eyes are close to each other and are on the back of the head. The mouth is large and terminal and there are small bristle-like teeth arranged in bands in each jaw. There is a small, weak, flattened spine on the operculum near the upper edge. The head and body, as well as the caudal and pectoral fins are covered in small ctenoid scales. The lateral line is straight and clearly visible. The first dorsal fin has 9 spines is small with a short base with its origin just in front of the origin of the pectoral fins and the second dorsal fin has a base which is around three times the length of first. The anal fin contains 23 soft rays, has a long base and is similar in shape and sits opposite the second dorsal fin, although it is positioned slightly to its rear, The caudal fin is slightly rounded. The pectoral fins are large and rounded. The pelvic fins ait at the jugular and are approximately arrow-shaped with the central fin rays being the longest. The maximum recorded total length was 16.8 cm (6.6 in). The overall colour is dusky shading to paler ventrally with around five wide vague darkish bands along the back and flanks while the fins have pale margins.

== Distribution and habitat ==
The flathead congoli is endemic to southeastern Australia where it is found around Tasmania and off Wilsons Promontory in Victoria. It is found on shallow, semi-exposed reefs where it sheltersbelow ledges and deep within caves during the day.

== Biology ==
The flathead congoli appears to be adapted for crawling around the substrate in confined spaces. Captive specimens have been observed to crawl over the substrate in preference to swimming. They have been fed on shrimps and other small crustaceans in captivity.
