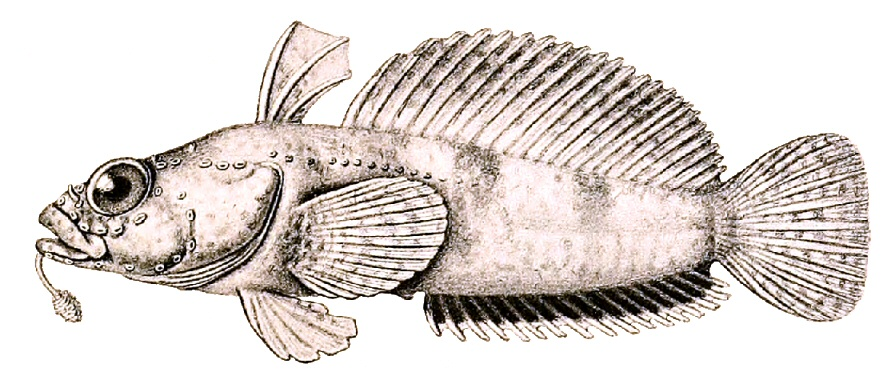
- Artedidraco mirus

Scientific classification
- Kingdom: Animalia
- Phylum: Chordata
- Class: Actinopterygii
- Order: Perciformes
- Family: Harpagiferidae
- Subfamily: Artedidraconinae; Eakin, 1988

Genera
- see text

= Artedidraconinae =

Family of fishes

The Artedidraconinae, barbeled plunderfishes, are a subfamily of marine ray-finned fishes, notothenioids belonging to the Perciform suborder Notothenioidei and the family Harpagiferidae. The family comprises four genera. These fishes are endemic to deep waters off Antarctica.

== Taxonomy ==
Artedidraconidae was first described as a family in 1988 by the American ichthyologist Richard Eakin with Artedidraco as its type genus, the type species of Artedidraco is A. mirus which was described in 1905 by the Swedish zoologist Einar Lönnberg. The genera in the family were previously classified as part of the Harpagiferidae before being placed in their own family. However, they are now again placed as a subfamily of the Harpagiferidae. The family is classified within the suborder Notothenioidei of the order Perciformes. The name of the family is a compound of Artedi, honouring the Swedish naturalist Peter Artedi who was known as the "father of ichthyology", and who was born 200 years before Lönnberg described A. mirus with draco, from dracœna meaning "dragon" an ancient Greek name for the weeverfish genus Trachinus , although this may be a reference to the relationship Lönnberg mentioned to Draconetta which was thought to be a member of the Nototheniidae at that time.

=== Genera ===
The following four genera are classified within the subfamily Artedidraconinae:

- Artedidraco Lönnberg, 1905
- Dolloidraco Roule, 1913
- Histiodraco Regan, 1914
- Pogonophryne Regan, 1914

Artedidraconinae taxa are said to have undergone sympatric speciation.

== Characteristics ==
Artedidraconinae fishes are characterised by having a body tapering from their large heads to their caudal fins. They have 2 dorsal fins, the first contains 2-7 spines and the second has 22-30 segmented soft rays while the anal fin has 14-21 soft rays. They have large pectoral fins containing 14-21 fin rays while the pelvic fins are positioned at the jugular and contain a single long, sharp spine and 5 soft rays. There are 8-11 branched rays in the caudal fin. They have a large and protractile mouth with small conical teeth on the jaws but none elsewhere. The snout has a single nostril on each side. There is a flattened and hooked spine on the operculum. There are no scales on the head and body. There are two lateral lines, upper and middle. A mental barbel, i.e. on the chin, is a characteristic of this family; the morphology of this barbel is variable with the species. They have structures called convexitas superaxillaris, which are large spherical protrusions with an elastic feel on the body, situated just under the base of the pectoral fin; they may have a role in the system of cold resistance, secreting anti-freeze proteins and possibly a social function, expressing dominance. The smallest species is Pogonophryne albipinna which has a maximum standard length of 3.8 cm (1.5 in) while the largest species in the family is Pogonophryne neyelovi which has a maximum total length of 35.5 cm (14.0 in).

== Distribution, habitat and biology ==
Artedidraconinae is found in the Southern Ocean where they occur in deeper waters around the continent of Antarctica and some sub Antarctic islands. That are found at depths between 5 and 2,500 m (16 and 8,202 ft). These fishes are sluggish and sedentary and typically stay motionless on the substrate for long periods waiting for prey to come to them, normally peracarid crustaceans and polychaete worms.
