= Selection methods in plant breeding based on mode of reproduction =

Plant breeders use different methods depending on the mode of reproduction of crops, which include:

- Self-fertilization, where pollen from a plant will fertilise reproductive cells or ovules of the same plant
- Cross-pollination, where pollen from one plant can only fertilize a different plant
- Asexual propagation (e.g. runners from strawberry plants) where the new plant is genetically identical to its parent
- Apomixis (self-cloning), where seeds are produced asexually and the new plant is genetically identical to its parent

The mode of reproduction of a crop determines its genetic composition, which, in turn, is the deciding factor to develop suitable breeding and selection methods. Knowledge of mode of reproduction is also essential for its artificial manipulation to breed improved types. Only those breeding and selection methods are suitable for a crop which does not interfere with its natural state or ensure the maintenance of such a state. It is due to such reasons that imposition of self-fertilization on cross-pollinating crops leads to drastic reduction in their performance.

For teaching purpose, plant breeding is presented as four categories: Line breeding (autogamous crops), population breeding (allogamous crops), hybrid breeding (mostly allogamous crops, some autogamous crops), clone breeding (vegetatively propagated crops).

== Self fertilizing crops (autogamous crops) ==
Certain restrictions caused the mechanisms for self-fertilization (partial and full self-fertilization) to develop in a number of plant species. Some of the reasons why a self-fertilizing method of reproduction is so effective are the efficacy of reproduction, as well as decreasing genetic variation and thus the fixation of highly adapted genotypes. Almost no inbreeding depression occurs in self-fertilizing plants because the mode of reproduction allows natural selection to take place in wild populations of such plants.

Critical steps in the improvement of self-fertilizing crops are the choice of parents and the identification of the best plants in segregating generations. The breeder should also have definite goals with the choice of parents. Self-fertilizing are easier to maintain, but this could lead to misuse of seed.

Some of the agronomy important, self-fertilizing crops include wheat, rice, barley, dry beans, soy beans, peanuts, tomatoes, etc.

== Mass selection ==
This method of selection depends mainly on the selection of plants according to their phenotype and performance. The seed from selected plants is bulked for the next generation. This method is used to improve the overall population by positive or negative mass selection. Mass selection is only applied to a limited degree in self-fertilizing plants and is an effective method for the improvement of landraces. This method of selection will only be effective for highly heritable traits. One shortage of mass selection is the large influence that the environment has on the development, phenotype, and performance of single plants. This can also be an advantage in that varieties can be selected for local performance.

== Selection of cross-pollinated crops ==
Plant species where normal mode of seed set is through a high degree of cross-pollination have characteristic reproductive features and population structure. Existence of self-sterility, self-incompatibility, imperfect flowers, and mechanical obstructions make the plant dependent upon foreign pollen for normal seed set. Each plant receives a blend of pollen from a large number of individuals each having different genotypes. Such populations are characterized by a high degree of heterozygosity with tremendous free and potential genetic variation, which is maintained in a steady state by free gene flow among individuals within the populations.

In the development of hybrid varieties, the aim is to identify the most productive heterozygote from the population, which then is produced with the exclusion of other members of the population.

=== Mass selection ===
It is the simplest, easiest and oldest method of selection where individual plants are selected based on their phenotypic performance, and bulk seed selection proved to be quite effective in maize improvement at the initial stages but its efficacy especially for improvement of yield, soon came under severe criticism that culminated in the refinement of the method of mass selection. The selection after pollination does not provide any control over the pollen parent as result of which effective selection is limited only to female parents. The heritability estimates are reduced by half, since only parents are used to harvest seed whereas the pollen source is not known after the cross pollination has taken place.

=== Recurrent selection ===
This type of selection is a refined version of the mass selection procedure and differs as follows:

- Visually selected individuals out of the base population undergo progeny testing
- Individuals selected on basis of the progeny test data are crossed with each other in every possible way to produce seed to form the new base population.

=== Half-sib selection with progeny testing ===
Selections are made based on progeny test performance instead of phenotypic appearance of the parental plants. Seed from selected half-sibs, which have been pollinated by random pollen from the population (meaning that only the female parent is known and selected, hence the term "half-sib") is grown in unreplicated progeny rows for the purpose of selection. A part of the seed is planted to determine the yielding ability, or breeding value, for any character of each plant. The seed from the most productive rows or remnant seed from the outstanding half-sibs is bulked to complete one cycle of selection.

=== Full-sib selection with progeny testing ===
A number of full-sib families, each produced by making crosses between the two plants from the base population are evaluated in replicated trials. A part of each full-sib family is saved for recombination. Based on evaluation the remnant seed of selected full-sib families is used to recombine the best families.

== Breeding of asexually propagated crops ==
Asexual reproduction covers all those modes of multiplication of plants where normal gamete formation and fertilization does not take place making these distinctly different from normal seed production crops. In the absence of sexual reproduction, the genetic composition of plant material being multiplied remains essentially the same as its source plant.

Clones of mother plants can be made with the exact genetic composition of the mother plant. Superior plants are selected and propagated vegetatively; the vegetative propagated offspring are used to develop stable varieties without any deterioration due to segregation of gene combinations. This unique characteristic of asexual reproduction helped to develop a number of cultivars of fruits and vegetables including grapes, apples, pears and peaches.

=== Improving asexual plant material through selection ===
The selection in these crops is restricted to the material introduced from other sources, such as field plantations. The improvement of asexually propagated plants through induced mutations has distinct advantages and limitations. Any vegetative propagule can be treated with mutagens and even a single desirable mutant or a part of a mutated propagule (chimera) can be multiplied as an improved type of the original variety.

=== Selection of asexual plants ===
Selection, in the case of asexual plants, can be defined as the selection of the best performing plant and the vegetative propagation thereof. Because plants are not totally genetically stable, it can be expected that deviations would occur through the years. Selection is thus an ongoing process where deviants are selected or removed from the selection program. The main purpose of selection is to better the quality and yield of forthcoming plantations. Different approaches can be followed in the selection process of asexual plants, such as mass selection and clone selection from clone blocks.

In mass selection there are some factors that must be considered when selecting plants in a mother block, e.g. vineyard. Time of selection is a big factor, because you have to select when most of the characteristics of the plant are clearly showing. With asexual perennials the best time is just before harvest. For the best results the selected plant must be evaluated during the next season, when growth-abnormalities, leave disfigurations and virus symptoms are best visualized. Mass selection is done annually on the same plant for a minimum of three years. A plant that does not conform to the requirements in any given year of the selection cycle is discarded from the program.

== New clone development ==
The development and registration of new clones take place by means of local clone selection in old plantations, as well as the importation of high quality clones from abroad, for local evaluation.

A clone is the vegetative offspring of one specific mother plant; it does not show any genetic, morphologic or physiologic deviations from the mother plant. Evaluation takes place with the different selected clones after selection.

== See also ==
- Genomics of domestication
