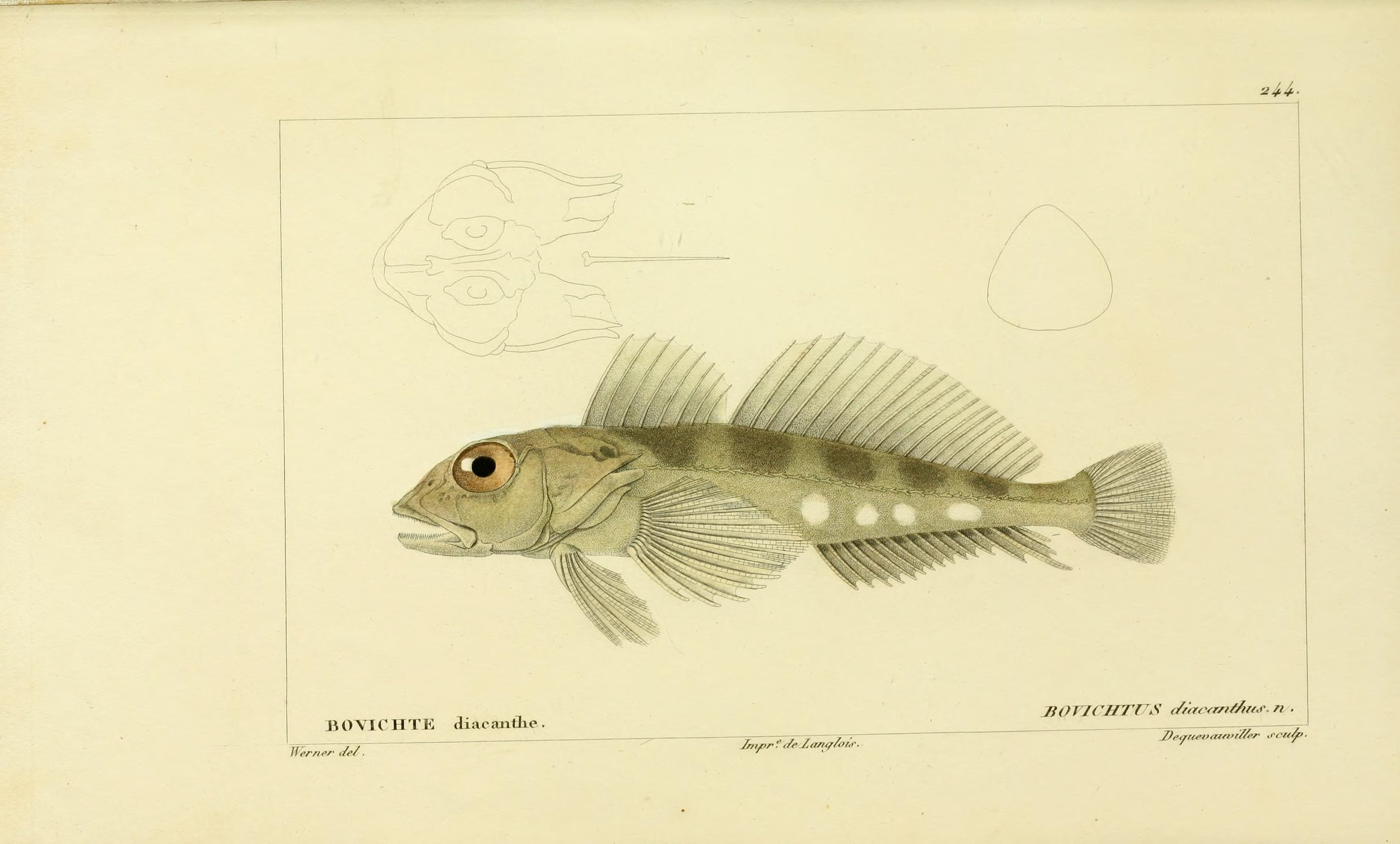

Scientific classification
- Kingdom: Animalia
- Phylum: Chordata
- Class: Actinopterygii
- Order: Perciformes
- Family: Bovichtidae
- Genus: Bovichtus
- Species: B. diacanthus

Binomial name
- Bovichtus diacanthus (Carmichael, 1819)

Synonyms
- Callionymus diacanthus Carmichael, 1819

= Bovichtus diacanthus =

Species of fish

Bovictus diacanthus, the Tristan klipfish, is a species of marine ray-finned fish, a temperate icefish or thornfish, belonging to the family Bovichtidae. It is endemic to two isolated, small island groups in the South Atlantic.

== Taxonomy ==
Bovichtus diacanthus was first formally described in 1819 as Callionymus diacanthusby the Scottish botanist and officer in the British Army Dugald Carmichael with the type locality given as Tristan da Cunha in the South Atlantic, When Achille Valenciennes described the genus Bovichtus in 1832 the only species he classified within the new genus was Carmichael's C. diacanthus which is therefore the type species of Bovichtus. The specific name diacanthus means "two spines", a reference to the two robust, needle-shaped and sharp spines on the operculum which are erected when the gill membrane is expanded.

== Description ==
Bovichtus diacanthus is species in the genus Bovichtus and these fishes are characterised by having a terminal, protractile mouth with teeth on the palatine. There are two robust backwards pointing spines on the operculum. They have a single lateral line and the anterior dorsal fin is spiny and starts above the operculum. The soft rays in the posterior dorsal fin and the anal fin are simple, the rear most anal fin rays are thickened and longer than the front rays. They are normally mottled in colour and their gill membranes direct the exiting water upwards, an adaptation for a sedentary benthic lifestyle. In the pectoral fins the lowest rays are unbranched with a thick cuticle, extend a little beyond the membrane and have upturned tips, the rearmost anal fin rays are also structured like this. This species attains a maximum total length of 25 cm (9.8 in).

== Distribution and habitat ==
Bovichtus diacanthus is restricted to the waters around Tristan da Cunha and Gough Island in the South Atlantic Ocean. It is found in rockpools which vary in depth from 10 to 200 cm (3.9 to 78.7 in) and in coastal waters down to depths of 20 m (66 ft).

== Biology ==
Bovichtus diacanthus has a pelagic stage of larvae which gather in large shoals. Once they have attain a total length of 5 to 6 cm (2.0 to 2.4 in) these settle and adopt a benthic lifestyle. The diet of Bovichtus: thornfishes is made up of invertebrates, mainly crustaceans and worms. This species is a batch spawner, the spawning season running from July and August. Females reach sexual maturity no later than 5 years old while for males the maximum age of sexual maturity is four years.
