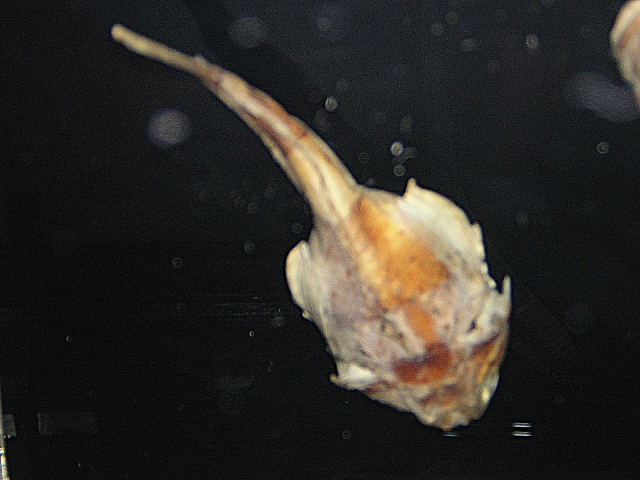
- Harpagifer antarcticus

Scientific classification
- Kingdom: Animalia
- Phylum: Chordata
- Class: Actinopterygii
- Order: Perciformes
- Suborder: Notothenioidei
- Family: Harpagiferidae
- Subfamily: Harpagiferinae; Gill, 1861
- Genus: Harpagifer; J. Richardson, 1844

Type species
- Batrachus bispinis J. R. Forster, 1801

Synonyms
- Family: Harpagiferoidae Gill, 1861

= Harpagifer =

Spiny plunderfishes

Genus of fishes

Harpagifer, the spiny plunderfishes is a genus of marine ray-finned fishes, belonging to the subfamily Harpagiferinae, it is the only genus in this monotypic subfamily. They are found in the Southern Ocean.

== Taxonomy ==
The genus Harpagifer was described in 1844 by the Scottish naval surgeon, naturalist and Arctic explorer John Richardson, with Batrachus bispinis, a species which had been described in 1801 by Johann Reinhold Forster, as its type species by monotypy. In 1961 the American ichthyologist Theodore Nicholas Gill realised that these fishes were different enough from other Notothenioid fishes that they should be placed in their own family which called Harpagiferoidae, although this is now spelled Harpagiferidae. The name of the genus Harpagifer compounds harpagos which means "hook" and fero meaning "to bear", a reference to the spine on the operculum of H. bispinis.

== Species ==
There are currently 12 recognized species in this genus:

- Harpagifer andriashevi Prirodina, 2000
- Harpagifer antarcticus Orvar Nybelin, 1947 (Antarctic spiny plunderfish)
- Harpagifer bispinis (J. R. Forster, 1801) (Magellan plunderfish)
- Harpagifer crozetensis Prirodina, 2004 (Littoral Crozet spiny plunderfish)
- Harpagifer georgianus Nybelin, 1947 (South Georgia spiny plunderfish)
- Harpagifer kerguelensis Nybelin, 1947 (Kerguelen spiny plunderfish)
- Harpagifer macquariensis Prirodina, 2000
- Harpagifer marionensis Nybelin, 1947
- Harpagifer nybelini Prirodina, 2000
- Harpagifer palliolatus J. Richardson, 1845 (Crested spiny plunderfish)
- Harpagifer permitini Neyelov & Prirodina, 2006 (Permitin spiny plunderfish)
- Harpagifer spinosus Hureau, Louis, Tomo & Ozouf-Costaz, 1980 (Deep-water spiny plunderfish)

== Characteristics ==
Harpagifer spiny plunderfishes have a relatively short and compressed body, lacking scales and with a large broad head. They typically have a first and second dorsal fin, the first dorsal fin is situated over the base of the pectoral fin and has between two and five flexible spines. The second dorsal fin is long based and contains 18-26 soft rays, the 2 dorsal fins are sometimes fused or separated by an incision. The anal fin has 16-19 soft rays. The large pectoral fins have a fan lkike shape and contain 15-18 fin rays while the well developed pelvic fins are on the throat and have a short, blunt spine and 5 branched rays. The rounded caudal fin has 9-14 branched rays. The jaws are equal in length with the upper jaw being protractible and both jaws have bands of small conical teeth with no clearly canine-like teeth and no teeth away from the jaws. There is a single nostril on each side of snout and no barbels on the chin. The opercle and subopercle have strong spines. The only scales on the naked body are on the two lateral lines. These are relatively small fishes which have standard lengths between 7 and 9.5 cm (2.8 and 3.7 in).

== Distribution, habitat and biology ==
Harpagifer spiny plunderfishes are largely restricted to Subantarctic islands, although there is one species which occurs along the coasts of the Antarctic Peninsula and another which is found around the southern tip of South America. They are small, benthic fishes which prey on small crustaceans. Most species are littoral but they can be found as deep as 180 m (590 ft). They are slow growing fish, reaching sexual maturity between the ages of 3 and 5 years old and around a total length of 7.5 cm (3.0 in) and they have been observed building nests and guarding their broods. The females may have 70-100 eggs per gramme of their total weight. They are important to the ecology of the areas where they are found as they are common prey for larger fishes and sea birds.

== See also ==
- List of fish families
