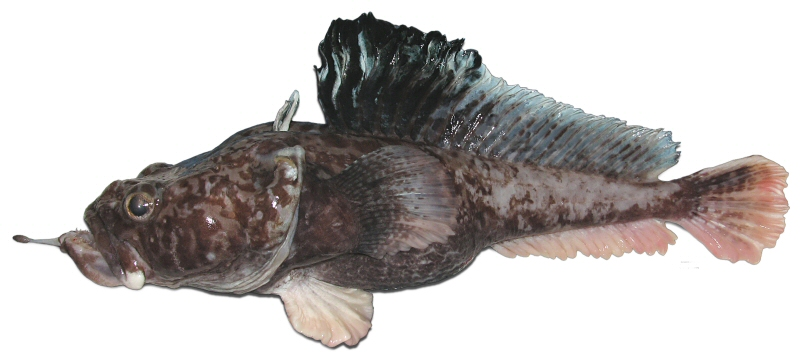
- Pogonophryne neyelovi

Scientific classification
- Kingdom: Animalia
- Phylum: Chordata
- Class: Actinopterygii
- Division: Teleostei
- Order: Perciformes
- Family: Harpagiferidae
- Subfamily: Artedidraconinae
- Genus: Pogonophryne; Regan, 1914

Type species
- Pogonophryne scotti Regan, 1914

= Pogonophryne =

Genus of fishes

Pogonophryne is a genus of marine ray-finned fishes belonging to the subfamily Artedidraconinae, the barbeled plunderfishes. They are native to the Southern Ocean.

== Taxonomy ==
Pogonophryne was first described as a genus in 1914 by the English ichthyologist Charles Tate Regan when he described a new species of fish, Pogonophryne scotti, which had been collected on the Terra Nova Expedition in the Ross Sea. P. scotti is, therefore, the type species of Pogonophryne by monotypy. The genus name is a compound of pogonos meaning "beard", a reference to the barbel on the chin of P. scotti, and "phryne" which means "toad", possibly an allusion to the bumps and knobs on the head, like the skin of a toad.

== Species ==
There are currently 28 recognized species in this genus:

- Pogonophryne albipinna Eakin, 1981 (White-fin plunderfish)
- Pogonophryne barsukovi Andriashev, 1967 (Stub-beard plunderfish)
- Pogonophryne bellingshausenensis Eakin, Eastman & Matallanas, 2008 (Spot-less nape plunderfish)
- Pogonophryne brevibarbata Balushkin, Petrov & Prut'ko, 2011 (Short-beard plunderfish)
- Pogonophryne cerebropogon Eakin & Eastman, 1998 (Brain-beard plunderfish)
- Pogonophryne dewitti Eakin, 1988 (Dewitt's plunderfish)
- Pogonophryne eakini Balushkin, 1999 (Eakin's plunderfish)
- Pogonophryne favosa Balushkin & Korolkova, 2013
- Pogonophryne fusca Balushkin & Eakin, 1998 (Dusky plunderfish)
- Pogonophryne immaculata Eakin, 1981 (Spot-less plunderfish)
- Pogonophryne lanceobarbata Eakin, 1987 (Lance-beard plunderfish)
- Pogonophryne macropogon Eakin, 1981 (Great-beard plunderfish)
- Pogonophryne maculiventrata Spodareva & Balushkin, 2014 (Spot-belly plunderfish)
- Pogonophryne marmorata Norman, 1938 (Marbled plunderfish)
- Pogonophryne mentella Andriashev, 1967 (Long-beard plunderfish)
- Pogonophryne neyelovi Shandikov & Eakin, 2013 (Hop-beard plunderfish)
- Pogonophryne orangiensis Eakin & Balushkin, 1998 (Orange-beard plunderfish)
- Pogonophryne pallida Balushkin & Spodareva, 2015 (Pale plunderfish)
- Pogonophryne pavlovi Balushkin, 2013 (Pavlov's plunderfish)
- Pogonophryne permitini Andriashev, 1967 (Fine-spotted plunderfish)
- Pogonophryne platypogon Eakin, 1988 (Flat-beard plunderfish)
- Pogonophryne sarmentifera Balushkin & Spodareva, 2013
- Pogonophryne scotti Regan, 1914 (Saddle-back plunderfish)
- Pogonophryne skorai Balushkin & Spodareva, 2013
- Pogonophryne squamibarbata Eakin & Balushkin, 2000 (Scale-beard plunderfish)
- Pogonophryne stewarti Eakin, Eastman & Near, 2009 (Stewart's plunderfish)
- Pogonophryne tronio Shandikov, Eakin & Usachev, 2013 (Turquoise plunderfish)
- Pogonophryne ventrimaculata Eakin, 1987 (Spot-belly plunderfish)

== Characteristics ==
Pogonophryne plunderfishes have a broad head which is flattened with post-temporal ridges which vary from weakly to well developed. They have a snout which is longer than the diameter of the eye and a broad space between the eyes. The mental barbel, the barbel on the chin which characterises the barbeled plunderfishes, is tapered to a point or expanded at its tip to a varying extent and frequently has branched or simple processes. The upper lateral line has tubular scales at the front and disc-shaped scales towards the back. The middle lateral line normally has disc-shaped scales to the front and tubular scales to the rear, frequently these are interspersed with disc-shaped scales. The maximum length of these fishes varies from a standard length of 3.8 cm (1.5 in) in P. albipinna to a total length of 35.5 cm (14.0 in) in P. neyelovi.

== Distribution, habitat and biology ==
Pogonophryne plunderfishes are found in the Southern Ocean around Antarctica reaching as far north as the South Shetland Islands. They are bathydemersal or bathypelagic in deeper water typically at depths greater than 100 m (330 ft). Their biology is little known but they are known to feed on polychaetes and crustaceans such as mysids, isopods and copepods.

== Reproduction and Spawning ==
Pogonophryne plunderfishes have reproductive traits like notothenioid fishes. This means that they have late sexual maturity, take a long time to develop their reproductive cells, and their eggs mature in groups at the same time. They are also oviparous, meaning they produce eggs that are outside of the mother’s body to develop and hatch. Some species, like Pogonophryne scotti shown in Figure 1, guard their eggs once they are laid along the seafloor, showing some species have parental instincts. There are thousands of eggs per female and as female body size increases, so does the number of eggs she carries.

Figure 1: https://figures.semanticscholar.org/e9bbe5bc681920ff53644a577bf3242f3541d476/4-Figure2-1.png

In this genus, there is variability among different species when it comes to sexual development and spawning. For instance, Pogonophryne barsukovi females have their eggs develop in two different groups, with each group at different stages of development. This species also has females that produce over 1,000 eggs in a single spawn. Meanwhile, in a studied sample of Pogonophryne immaculata, each fish was a developing male, hinting that this species may all start life as males before changing to female as they get older or as needed. There is also variation in seasonal spawning, with the species, with Pogonophryne barsukovi and Pogonophryne immaculata spawning in the Autumn and Pogonophryne scotti spawning in late Spring to early Summer. Overall, the genus Pogonophryne has key reproductive similarities across its species, while also having variability when it comes to things like spawning season and stages of development.
