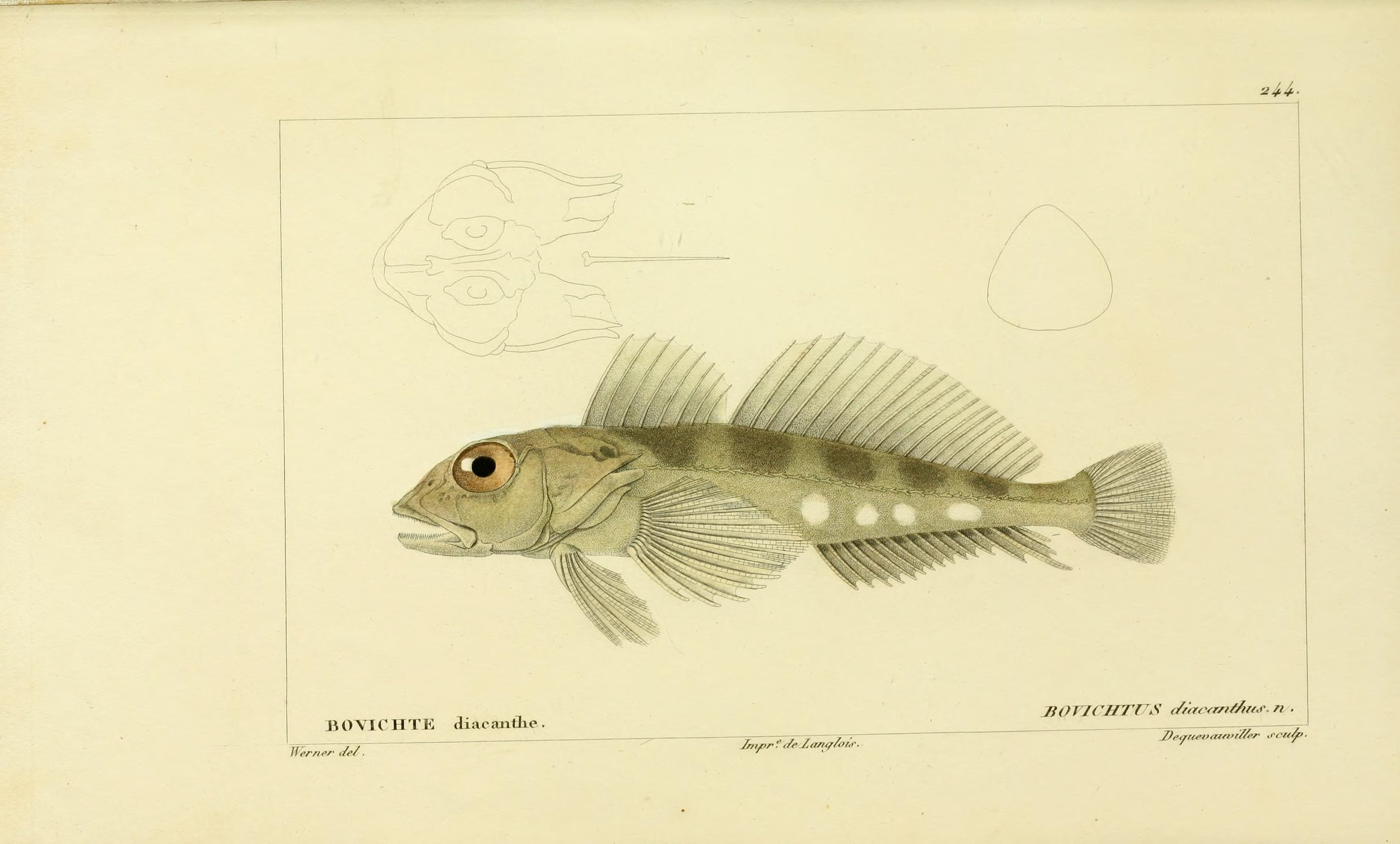
- illustration of Callionymus diacanthus
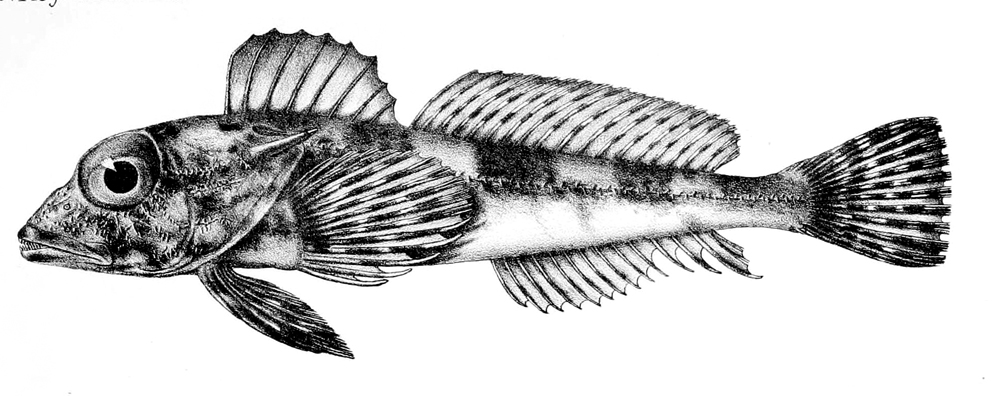
- Bovichtus angustifrons

Scientific classification
- Kingdom: Animalia
- Phylum: Chordata
- Class: Actinopterygii
- Order: Perciformes
- Family: Bovichtidae
- Genus: Bovichtus; Valenciennes, 1832

Type species
- Callionymus diacanthus Carmichael, 1819

Synonyms
- Aurion Waite, 1916

= Bovichtus =

Genus of fishes

Bovichtus is a genus of fish in the family Bovichtidae found in the Atlantic, Indian and Pacific Ocean.

== Taxonomy ==
Bovichtus was formally described as a genus in 1832 by the French zoologist Achille Valenciennes with Callionymus diacanthus, which had been described by the Scottish botanist and officer in the British Army Dugald Carmichael in 1819 with the type locality given as Tristan da Cunha in the South Atlantic, as the type species. The name of the genus, Bovichtus, is derived from bovus meaning "bull" and ichthys which means fish, based on the local name for Bovichtus species in Valparaíso, Chile, torito, meaning "little bull".

=== Species ===
There are currently 8 recognized species in this genus:

- Bovichtus angustifrons Regan, 1913
- Bovichtus argentinus MacDonagh, 1931
- Bovichtus chilensis Regan, 1913
- Bovichtus diacanthus (Carmichael, 1819)
- Bovichtus oculus Hardy, 1989
- Bovichtus psychrolutes Günther, 1860 (Scaled thornfish)
- Bovichtus variegatus (J. Richardson, 1846) (Thornfish)
- Bovichtus veneris Sauvage, 1879

A genetic review of the South American species found that B. argentinus and the specimens claimed to be of "B. diacanthus" collected off South America were all the same species, the oldest name for which would be B. chilensis, this includes B. elongatus of the Antarctic as a synonym of B. chilensis. This does not appear to have been widely accepted.

== Characteristics ==
Bovichtus fishes have a terminal, protractile mouth with teeth on the palatine. There is a robust backwards pointing spine on the operculum. They have a single lateral line and the anterior dorsal fin is spiny and starts above the operculum. The soft rays in the posterior dorsal fin and the anal fin are simple, the rear most anal fin rays are thickened and longer than the front rays. If they have any scales, they are restricted to an isolated patch to the rear of the base of the pectoral fins. They are normally mottled in colour and their gill membranes direct the exiting water upwards, an adaptation for a sedentary benthic lifestyle. In the pectoral fins the lowest rays are unbranched with a thick cuticle, extend a little beyond the membrane and have upturned tips, the rearmost anal fin rays are also structured like this. This is apparently convergent with the unrelated blennies of the subfamily Blenniinae and may be an adaptation for clinging on to surfaces. Any scales present ate cteniod.

== Distribution and habitat ==
Bovichtus fishes are found in the temperate and Antarctic waters of the Southern Hemisphere. They occur along both the Pacific and Atlantic coasts of southern South American, off the Antarctic Peninsula, Tristan da Cunha in the South Atlantic Ile St Paul in the southern Indian Ocean, southern Australia, Tasmania, New Zealand, the Campbell Plateau and on seamounts to the east of New Zealand in the southern Pacific. One species, B. oculus is found in deep waters on the Campbell Plateau while all of the remaining species have their adult form as benthic dwellers on rocky reefs in shallow waters or in tidal or inter-tidal pools.

== Biology ==
Bovichtus are mainly benthic species, waiting on the substrate to ambush prey and have been seen perched underneath or upside down on surfaces, presumably using their adapted pectoral and anal fins to grip with. Their diet is made up of invertebrates, mainly crustaceans and worms. At least one species has a pelagic larval phase which allows for dispersal and may account for the relatively wide distribution of the genus compared to the other two genera in the family Bovichtidae.
