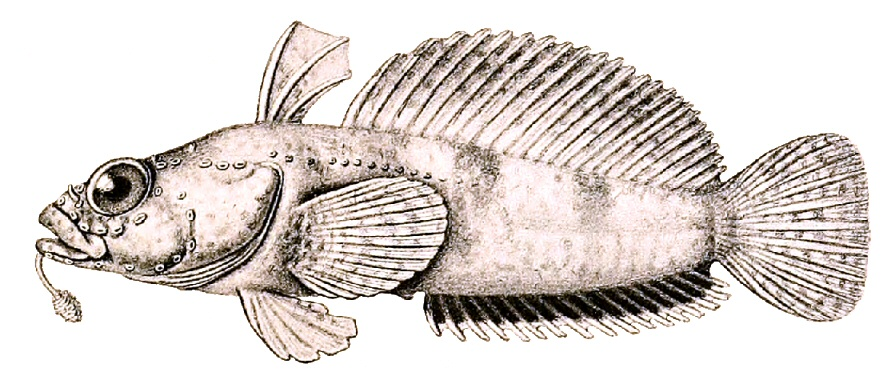
- Artedidraco mirus

Scientific classification
- Kingdom: Animalia
- Phylum: Chordata
- Class: Actinopterygii
- Order: Perciformes
- Family: Harpagiferidae
- Subfamily: Artedidraconinae
- Genus: Artedidraco; Lönnberg, 1905

Type species
- Artedidraco mirus Lönnberg, 1905

= Artedidraco =

Genus of fishes

Artedidraco is a genus of marine ray-finned fishes belonging to the subfamily Artedidraconinae, the barbeled plunderfishes. They are native to the Southern Ocean.

== Taxonomy ==
Artedidraco was first described as a genus in 1905 by the Swedish zoologist Einar Lönnberg when he created the genus for Artedidraco mirus, a new species of fish from South Georgia he was describing following the collection of its types by the Swedish Antarctic Expedition. As it was the only species in the new genus it was the type species by monotypy. The generic name is a compound of Artedi, honouring the Swedish naturalist Peter Artedi who was known as the "father of ichthyology", and who was born 200 years before Lönnberg described A. mirus with draco, from dracœna meaning "dragon" an ancient Greek name for the weeverfish genus Trachinus, although this may be a reference to the relationship Lönnberg mentioned to Draconetta which was thought to be a member of the Nototheniidae at that time.

== Species ==
There are currently 7 recognized species in this genus:

- Artedidraco glareobarbatus Eastman & Eakin, 1999
- Artedidraco longibarbatus Eakin, Riginella & La Mesa, 2015 (Long-beard plunderfish)
- Artedidraco lonnbergi Roule, 1913
- Artedidraco mirus Lönnberg, 1905
- Artedidraco orianae Regan, 1914
- Artedidraco shackletoni Waite, 1911
- Artedidraco skottsbergi Lönnberg, 1905

== Characteristics ==
Artedidraco is the type genus of the family Artedidraconidae and so has many of the features characteristic of that family. Within the Atredidraconidae this genus is separated from the others by the first dorsal fin being located above the pectoral fin base. Their heads have a width which is roughly the same as their depth and the post temporal ridges are weakly developed. The snout is shorter than the diameter of the eye and the space between the eyes is narrow. The mental barbel, the barbel on the chin which characterises the barbeled plunderfishes, is tapered or expanded towards its tip. They have small jaws which are equipped with small conical teeth arranged in a band of many series of teeth. The upper lateral line has tubed scales at the head end and towards the caudal fin it normally has disc shaped scales, the middle lateral line consist of disc-shaped scales. The maximum total length of these fishes varies from 11 cm (4.3 in) in A. lonnbergi to 15.1 cm (5.9 in) in A. orianae.

== Distribution, habitat and biology ==
Artedidraco is found in the coastal waters of the Antarctic continent with one species, A. mirus occurring as far north as South Georgia. They are found in the nearshore sublittoral zone and on the continental shelf and have been recorded as deep as 800 m (2,600 ft). Their biology is little known but the species in this genus feed largely on polychaetes and small crustaceans.
