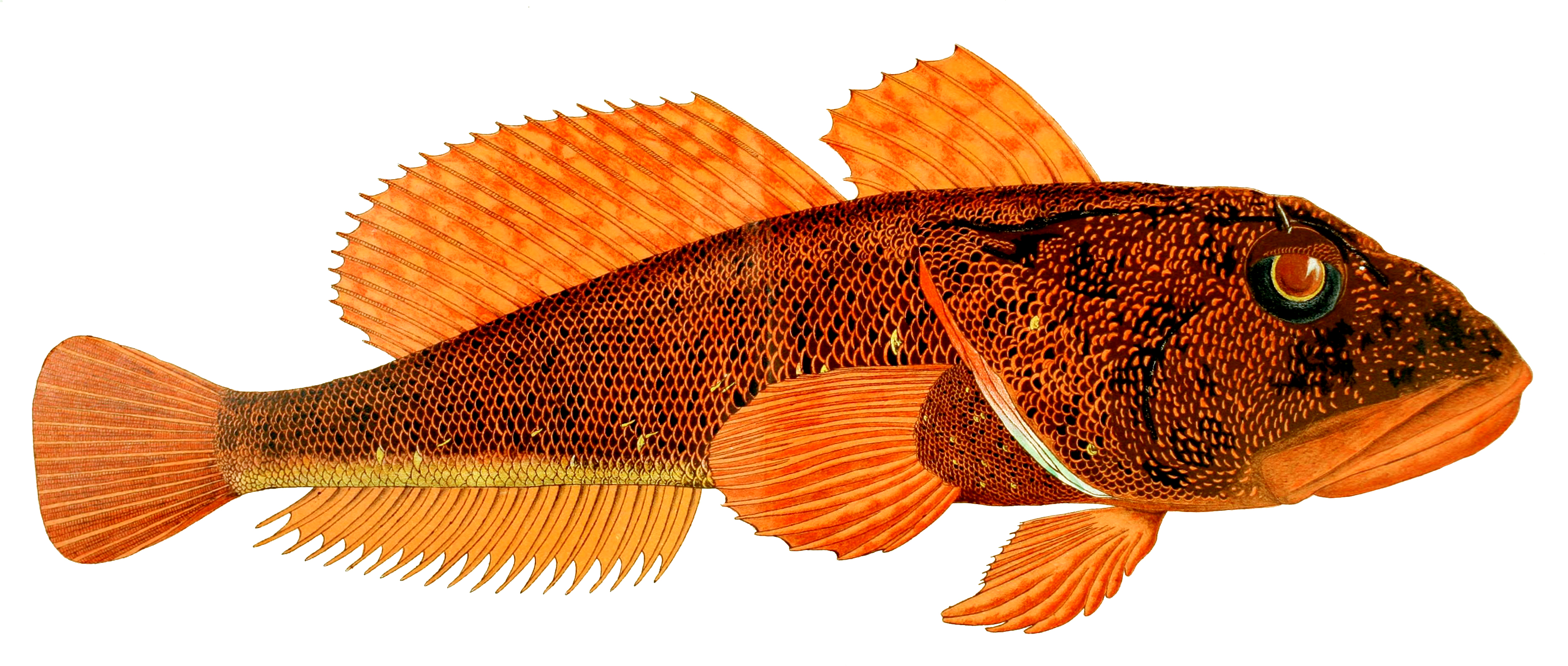
- Cottoperca gobio Drawing by Angel

Scientific classification
- Kingdom: Animalia
- Phylum: Chordata
- Class: Actinopterygii
- Division: Teleostei
- Order: Perciformes
- Suborder: Notothenioidei
- Family: Bovichtidae; T. N. Gill, 1861

Genera
- see text

= Bovichtidae =

Family of fishes

Bovichtidae, the temperate icefishes or thornfishes, is a family of marine ray-finned fishes, classified in the suborder Notothenioidei of the order Perciformes. They are native to coastal waters off Australia, New Zealand, and South America.

== Systematics ==
Bovichtidae was first formally described as a family in 1861 by the American ichthyologist Theodore Nicholas Gill. The family name was spelled Bovichthyidae in the 4th edition of J. S. Nelson's Fishes of the World but has been reverted to Bovichtidae in the 5th edition. Phylogenetic analysis of morphological characters has revealed that the family Bovichtidae may not be a monophyletic group. Bovichtidae is one of two families of the suborder Notothenioidei with a primarily non-Antarctic distribution, the other being Pseudaphritidae. The name of the family is taken from its type genus, Bovichtus which is derived from bovus meaning "bull" and ichthys which means fish, based on the local name for Bovichtus species in Valparaíso, Chile, torrito, the "little bull".

The Bovichtidae is the sister family to the Pseudaphritidae which in turn is sister to the Eleginopidae and these are all sister to the rest of the families in the Notothenoidei which have been placed in the suggested superfamily Cryonotothenioidea. The Bovichtidae are regarded as the most basal family in the suborder.

=== Genera ===
Currently, three genera are included in this family, with the catadromous genus Pseudaphritis (Castelnau, 1872) now being placed in its own family, Pseudaphritidae.

- Bovichtus Valenciennes, 1832
- Cottoperca Steindachner, 1875
- Halaphritis Last, Balushkin & Hutchins, 2002

== Characteristics ==
Bovichtidae icefishes are characterised by a protrusible a not very elongated or pronounced snout. The gill membranes not connected to the isthmus and they project quite far forward. There is a single lateral line. They have a long, compressed body with two dorsal fins, the front dorsal fin being spiny. There are no spines in the anal fin. There is a spine on the operculum which may be weak and flattened or robust, long and pointed. There is a single nostril on the snout. There are small conical teeth on the jaws, vomer and palatine. There is no swim bladder.

== Distribution and habitat ==
Bovichtidae species are found in the southern hemisphere where they occur in marine waters off southern South America, southern Australia and New Zealand.
