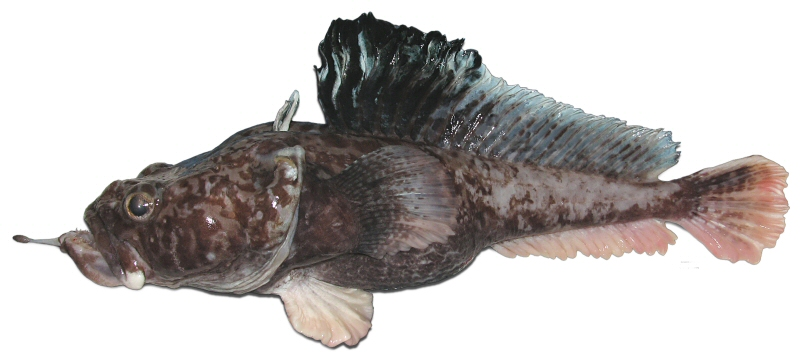
- Pogophryne neyelovi

Scientific classification
- Kingdom: Animalia
- Phylum: Chordata
- Class: Actinopterygii
- Order: Perciformes
- Suborder: Notothenioidei
- Family: Harpagiferidae; Gill, 1861

Genera
- Artedidraco; Harpagifer; Dolloidraco; Histiodraco; Pogonophryne

= Harpagiferidae =

Family of fishes

Harpagiferidae, the plunderfishes, are a family of marine perciform fishes native to the Southern Ocean.

== Taxonomy ==
The following subfamilies and genera are classified within it:

- Family Harpagiferidae Gill, 1861
  - Subfamily Harpagiferinae Gill, 1861 (spiny plunderfishes)
    - Genus Harpagifer Richardson, 1844
  - Subfamily Artedidraconinae Andriashev, 1967 (barbeled plunderfishes)
    - Genus Artedidraco Lönnberg, 1905
    - Genus Dolloidraco Roule, 1913
    - Genus Histiodraco Regan, 1914
    - Genus Pogonophryne Regan, 1914

In the past, Artedidraconinae was instead classified as its own family. However, Eschmeyer's Catalog of Fishes presently considers it a subfamily of Harpagiferidae.
