= Chuyu =

Chuyu or Chu Yu may refer to:

- Chuyu (楚語), section of the ancient classics Guoyu
- Chu Yu (楚妤), character in Chinese television series General and I
- Chūyū Seirogan (忠勇征露丸), Japanese medicine merchant Saichi Nakajima (中島佐一) developed
- James Soong (宋楚瑜; Song Chu-yu; born 1942), Taiwanese politician
- Liu Chuyu (劉楚玉) (died 466), princess of the Chinese Liu Song dynasty
- Mao Chu Yu (毛楚玉), winner of the competition in Chinese television show China's Next Top Model (season 3)
- Xue Chuyu (薛楚玉), general of the Chinese rebel state Yan Xue Song's father

== See also ==
- Zhu Yu (disambiguation), also spelled Chu Yu in the Wade–Giles
