= Keller's reagent (organic) =

Chemical reagent for testing alkaloids and cardiac glycosides

In organic chemistry, Keller's reagent is a mixture of anhydrous (glacial) acetic acid, concentrated sulfuric acid, and small amounts of ferric chloride, used to detect alkaloids. Keller's reagent can also be used to detect other kinds of alkaloids via reactions in which it produces products with a wide range of colors. Cohn describes its use to detect the principal components of digitalis (note that they may not be alkaloids). The reaction with this reagent is also known as the Keller–Kiliani reaction, after C. C. Keller and H. Kiliani, who both used it to study digitalis in the late 19th century. It can be used for digitoxin's quantitative analysis.Another method of visualizing the Keller-Kiliani reaction is to treat the test solution with ferric chloride-containing glacial acetic acid, followed by the addition of concentrated sulfuric acid, which sinks to the bottom (like in the brown ring test for nitrates). A brown ring in the interface indicates the presence of cardenolides.

== List of color changes with various compounds ==
- Digoxin: olive-brown without red traces
- Digitoxin: green, then blue
- Digoxigenin: greenish-yellow
- Vindolicine: bright blue
- Uleine: yellow-brown
- Hunteria eburnea alkaloid J (C_{39}H_{46}N_{4}O_{2}): pale red, later blue violet

== See also ==
- Dische test
- Baljet reaction
