= Seiro =

Seiro may refer to:

- Seirō, Niigata, a town in Niigata prefecture, Japan
- Seiro (steamer), a steaming basket used in Japanese cuisine
- Seirogan, a traditional Japanese medicine
- Seirō Takeshi (born 1988), sumo wrestler
