= Tar =

Dark viscous organic liquid

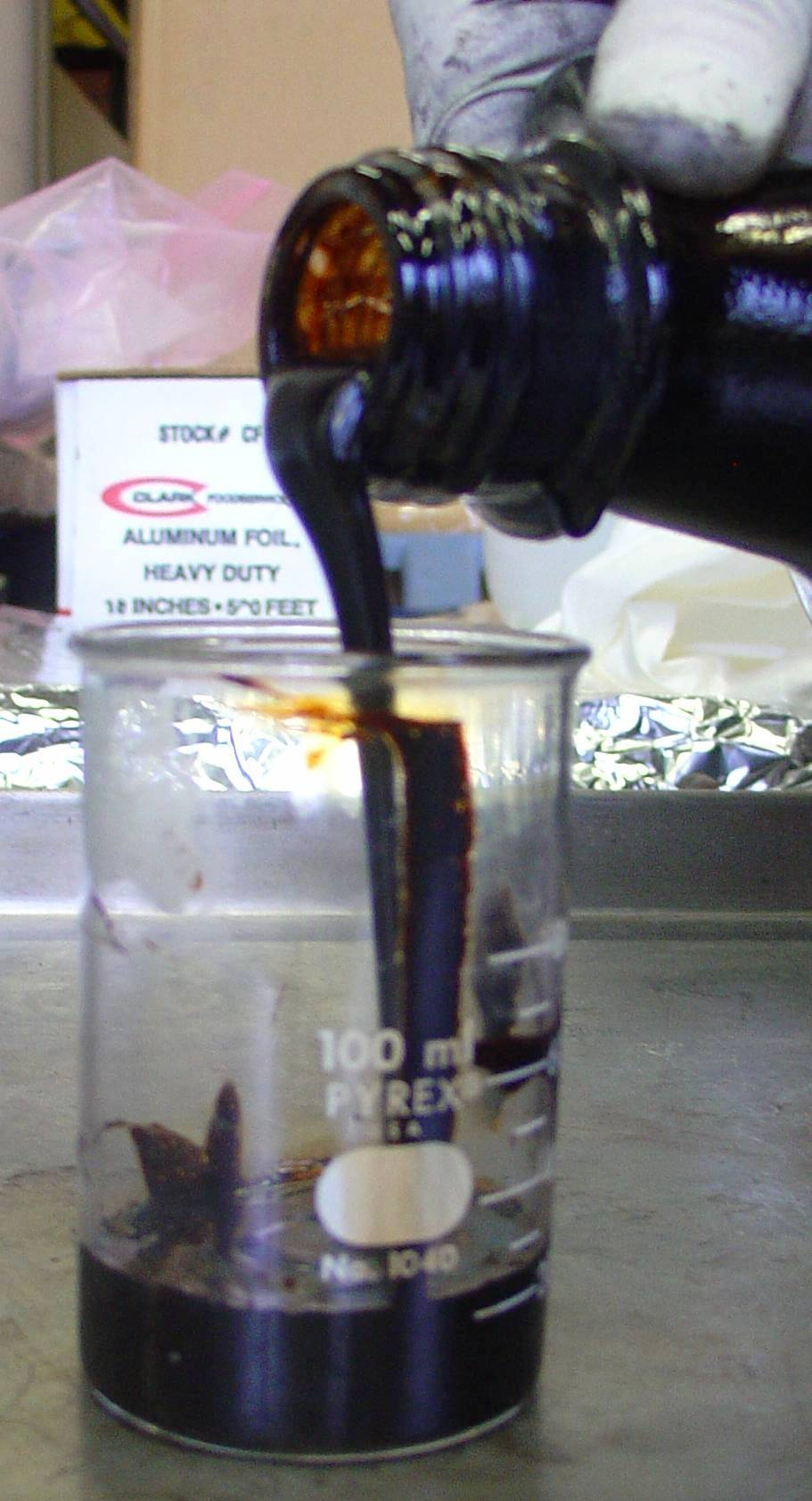
One can produce a tar-like substance from corn stalks by heating them in a microwave oven. This process is known as pyrolysis.

Tar is a dark brown or black viscous liquid of hydrocarbons and free carbon, obtained from a wide variety of organic materials through destructive distillation. Tar can be produced from carbon-rich materials such as coal, wood, petroleum, peat, and other organic matter.

Mineral products resembling tar can be produced from fossil hydrocarbons, such as petroleum. Coal tar is produced from coal as a byproduct of coke production.

== Terminology ==
"Tar" and "pitch" can be used interchangeably. Asphalt (naturally occurring pitch) may also be called either "mineral tar" or "mineral pitch". There is a tendency to use "tar" for more liquid substances and "pitch" for more solid (viscoelastic) substances. Both "tar" and "pitch" are applied to viscous forms of asphalt, such as the asphalt found in naturally occurring tar pits (e.g., the La Brea Tar Pits in Los Angeles). "Rangoon tar", also known as "Burmese oil" or "Burmese naphtha", is also a form of petroleum. Oil sands, found extensively in Alberta, Canada, and composed of asphalt, are colloquially referred to as "tar sands".

== Wood tar ==
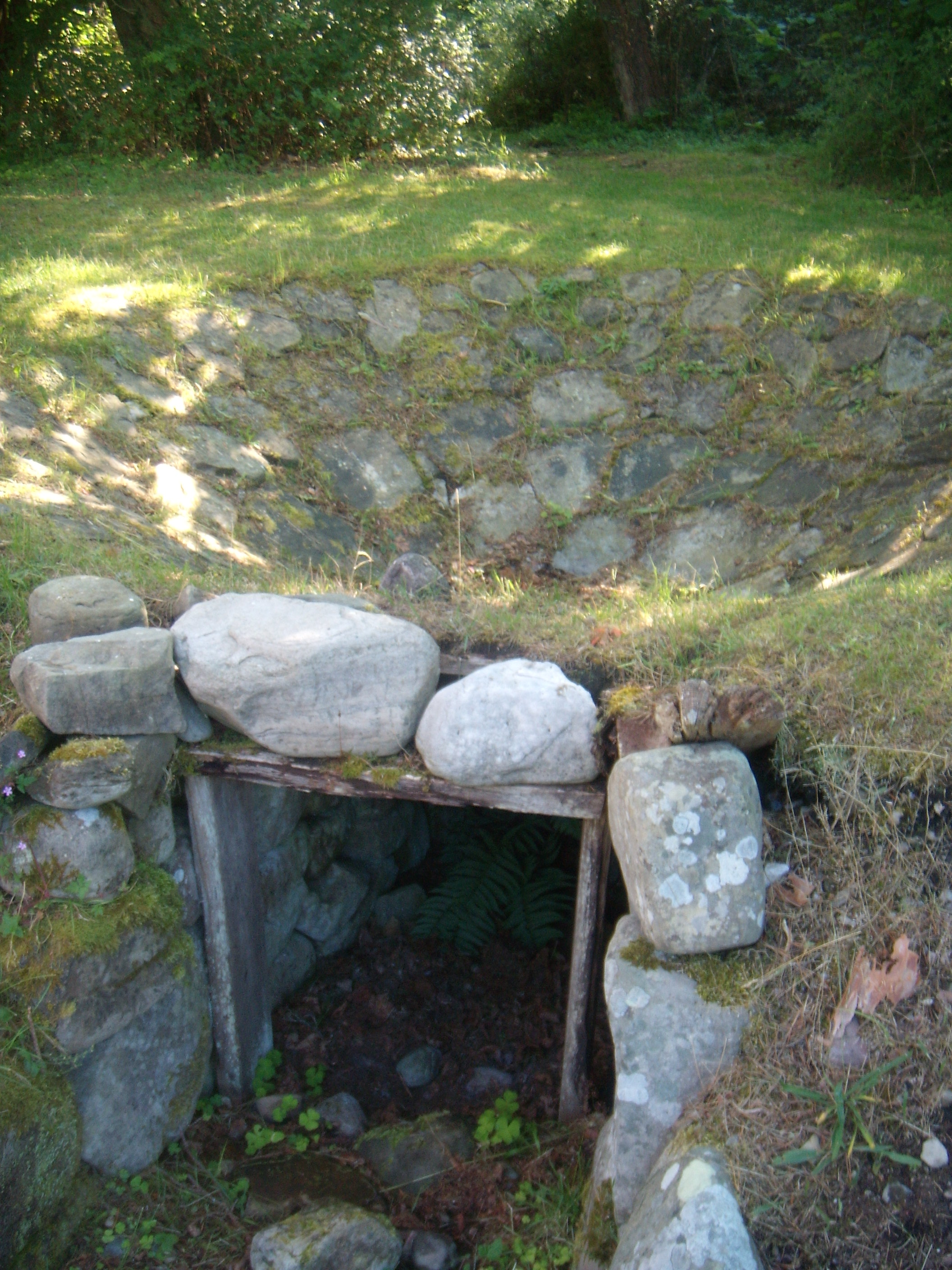
Tar kiln at Trollskogen in Öland, Sweden

Since prehistoric times, wood tar has been used as a water-repellent coating for boats, ships, sails, and roofs. In Scandinavia, it was produced as a cash crop. "Peasant Tar" might be named after the district where it is produced.

Wood tar is still used as an additive in the flavoring of candy, alcohol, and other foods. Wood tar is microbicidal. Techniques for producing tar from wood were known in ancient Greece and have probably been used in Scandinavia since the Iron Age. Production and trade in pine-derived tar was a major contributor in the economies of Northern Europe and Colonial America. Its main use was in preserving wooden sailing vessels against rot. For centuries, dating back at least to the 14th century, tar was among Sweden's most important exports. Sweden exported 13,000 barrels of tar in 1615 and 227,000 barrels in the peak year of 1863. The largest user was the Royal Navy of the United Kingdom. Demand for tar declined with the advent of iron and steel ships. Production nearly stopped in the early 20th century. Traditional wooden boats are still sometimes tarred.

The heating (dry distilling) of pine wood causes tar and pitch to drip away from the wood and leave behind charcoal. Birch bark is used to make particularly fine tar, known as "Russian oil", used in Russian leather protection. The by-products of wood tar are turpentine and charcoal. When deciduous tree woods are subjected to destructive distillation, the products are methanol (wood alcohol) and charcoal.

Tar kilns (Swedish: tjärmila, Danish: tjæremile, Norwegian: tjæremile, Finnish: tervahauta, Estonian: tõrvaahi) are dry distillation ovens, historically used in Scandinavia for producing tar from wood. They were built close to the forest, from limestone or from more primitive holes in the ground. The bottom is sloped into an outlet hole to allow the tar to pour out. The wood is split into finger-sized pieces, stacked densely, and finally covered tightly with earth and moss. If oxygen can enter, the wood might catch fire, and the production would be ruined. On top of this, a fire is stacked and lit. After a few hours, the tar starts to pour out and continues to do so for a few days.

=== Uses ===
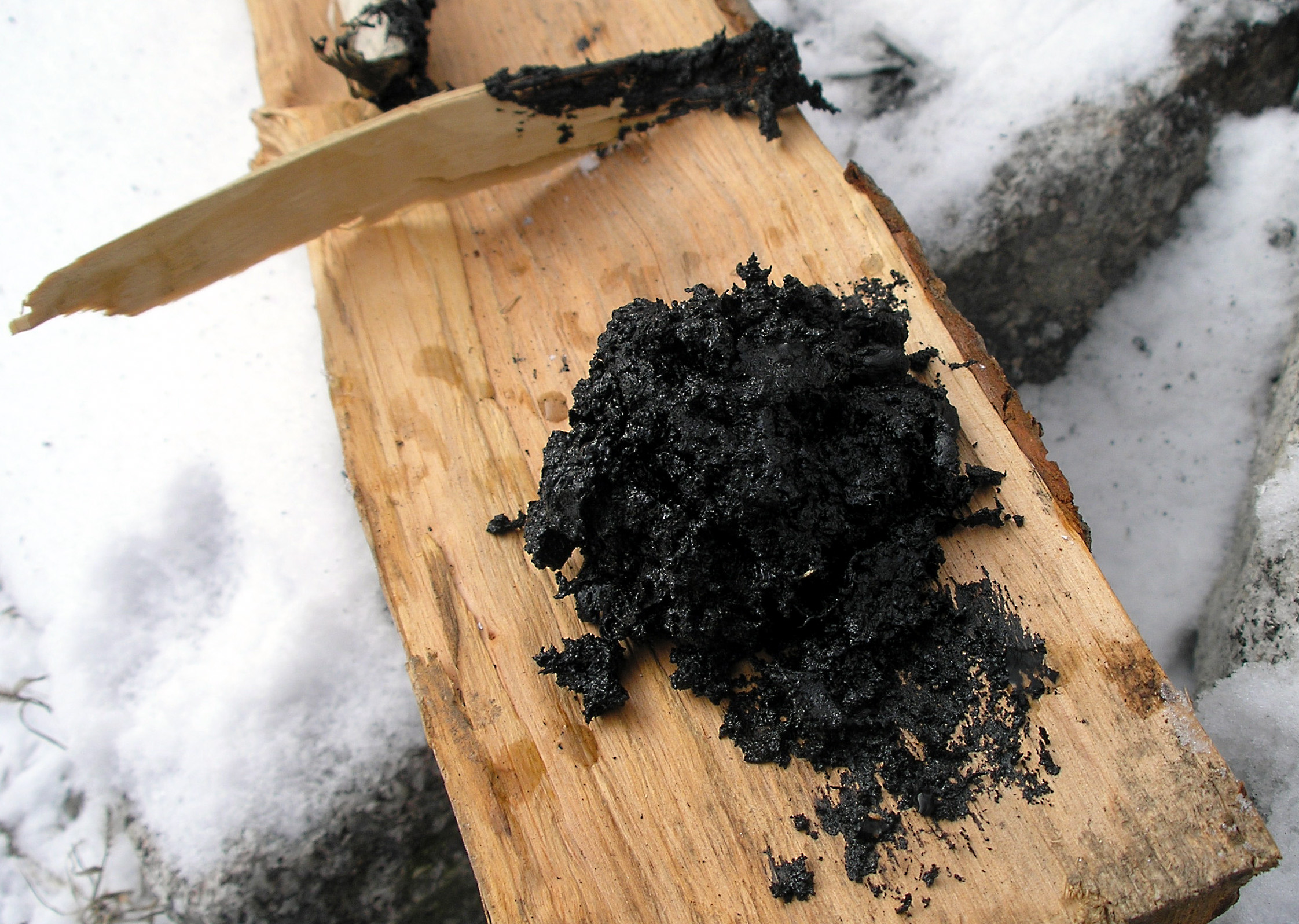
Birch tar

Tar was used as a sealant for roofing shingles and tar paper and to seal the hulls of ships and boats. For millennia, wood tar was used to waterproof sails and boats, but today, sails made from inherently waterproof synthetic substances have reduced the demand for tar. Wood tar is still used to seal traditional wooden boats and the roofs of historic, shingle-roofed churches, as well as to paint the exterior walls of log buildings. Tar is also a general disinfectant. Pine tar oil, or wood tar oil, is used for the surface treatment of wooden shingle roofs, boats, buckets, and tubs, and in the medicine, soap, and rubber industries. Pine tar penetrates well into rough wood. An old wood tar oil recipe for the treatment of wood is one-third each genuine wood tar, balsam turpentine, and boiled or raw linseed oil or Chinese tung oil.

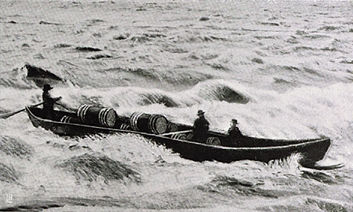
A boat transporting pine tar barrels on Oulu River in 1910

In Finland, wood tar was once considered a panacea reputed to heal "even those cut in twain through their midriff". A Finnish proverb states that "if sauna, vodka and tar won't help, the disease is fatal." Wood tar is used in traditional Finnish medicine because of its microbicidal properties.

Wood tar is also available diluted as tar water, which has numerous uses:

- As a flavoring for candies (e.g., Terva Leijona) and alcohol (Terva Viina).
- As a spice for food, like meat.
- As a scent for saunas. Tar water is mixed into water, which is turned into steam in the sauna.
- As an anti-dandruff agent in shampoo.
- As a component of cosmetics.

Mixing tar with linseed oil varnish produces tar paint. Tar paint has a translucent brownish hue and can be used to saturate and tone wood, protecting it from the weather. Tar paint can also be toned with various pigments, producing translucent colors and preserving the wood texture.

Tar was once used for public humiliation, known as tarring and feathering. By pouring hot wood tar onto somebody's bare skin and waiting for it to cool, they would remain stuck in one position. From there, people would attach feathers to the tar, which would remain stuck on the tarred person for the duration of the punishment. That person would then become a public example for the rest of the day.

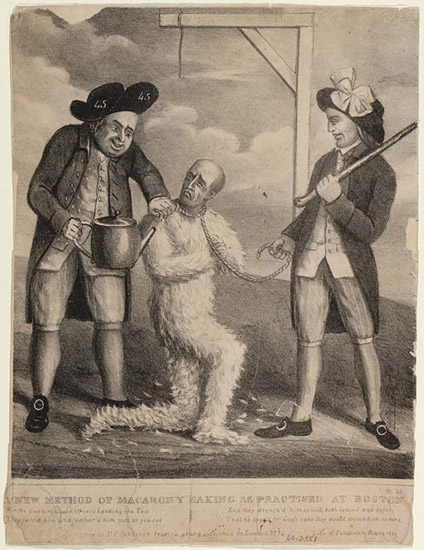
A New Method of Macarony Making As Practiced at Boston (1830). An outdoor scene of three men standing in front of a gallows with a broken rope hanging from the gallows. One man is tarred and feathered from the neck down and has the other half of the broken rope around his neck.

Pitch was familiar in 9th-century Iraq, derived from petroleum that became accessible from natural fields in the region. It was sometimes used in the construction of baths or in shipbuilding.

== Coal tar ==
Coal tar was formerly one of the products of gasworks. Tar made from coal or petroleum is considered toxic and carcinogenic because of its high benzene content, though coal tar in low concentrations is used as a topical medicine for conditions such as psoriasis. Coal and petroleum tar has a pungent odor.

Coal tar is listed at number 1999 in the United Nations list of dangerous goods.

== See also ==
- Bitumen
- Creosote
- Pitch (resin)
- Rollins Tars
- Tar Heels
- Tar pit
- Tarmac
- Tar (tobacco residue)
