= Harold Edwin Umbarger =

American bacteriologist and biochemist

Harold Edwin Umbarger (17 July 1921, Shelby, Ohio – 15 November 1999, Carmel, Indiana) was an American bacteriologist and biochemist.

== Biography ==
Umbarger grew up in Mansfield, Ohio and graduated from Mansfield Senior High School in 1939. At Ohio University he graduated with a bachelor's degree in chemistry in 1943 and a master's degree in zoology in 1944. For two years from 1944 to 1946 he served in the U.S. Navy as a hospital corpsman. In 1945 he served aboard the USS Rescue. In 1950 he received a Ph.D. in bacteriology from Harvard University. His doctoral thesis, supervised by J. Howard Mueller, is entitled Studies on the Interactions Involved in the Biosynthetic Mechanisms of Isoleucine and Valine in Escherichia Coli. From 1950 to 1959 Umbarger did research at Harvard. From 1957 to 1960 he was an assistant professor of bacteriology and Immunology at Harvard Medical School, but he was untenured. For the academic year 1959–1960, on leave of absence from Harvard, he worked at several laboratories in England. From 1960 to 1964 he held the appointment of Staff Investigator at the Cold Spring Harbor Laboratory. At Purdue University he was appointed in 1964 a full professor and in 1970 Wright Distinguished Professor of Biological Sciences. He held that professorship until his retirement.

Umbarger was a leading expert on biosynthesis of amino acids in bacteria. He is perhaps best known as the co-discoverer, with Edward A. Adelberg in 1953, of feedback inhibition in the metabolism of valine and isoleucine. Feedback inhibition in biochemistry had been reported in an almost unknown paper a decade earlier by Zacharias Dische.

H(arold) Edwin Umbarger had a major role in defining the pathways that living organisms employ to produce branched-chain amino acids (L-leucine, L-isoleucine, and L-valine), which are required in all proteins. He also played a pivotal role in identifying the biochemical mechanisms that bacterial and yeast cells use to modulate the synthesis of these amino acids in order to match their utilization in protein synthesis.

While he was still a student, Umbarger married Merle Gladys Abele (1922–1993). They had three daughters. In 1995 he married his second wife.

== Awards and honors ==
- 1963 — Guggenheim Fellowship.
- 1971 — Elected a Member of the American Academy of Arts and Sciences.
- 1975 — Rosenstiel Award, jointly with Arthur B. Pardee (for independent research).
- 1976 — Elected a Member of the National Academy of Sciences.
- 1999 — Establishment of H. Edwin Umbarger Distinguished Professorship of Genetics at Purdue University. The first holder of the professorship was Jeffrey Bennetzen, succeeded (in 2012) by Stanton B. Galvin.

== Selected publications ==
- Umbarger, H. E. (1956). "Evidence for a Negative-Feedback Mechanism in the Biosynthesis of Isoleucine". Science. 123 (3202): 848. Bibcode:1956Sci...123..848U. doi:10.1126/science.123.3202.848. PMID 13324101.
- Umbarger, H. E.; Brown, B. (1957). "Threonine deamination in Escherichia coli II. Evidence for two L-threonine deaminases". Journal of Bacteriology. 73 (1): 105–112. doi:10.1128/JB.73.1.105-112.1957. PMC 289754. PMID 13405870.
- Umbarger, H. E. (1961). "Feedback Control by Endproduct Inhibition". Cold Spring Harbor Symposia on Quantitative Biology. 26: 301–312. doi:10.1101/SQB.1961.026.01.036. PMID 13923752.
- Freundlich, M.; Burns, R. O.; Umbarger, H. E. (1962). "Control of Isoleucine, Valine, and Leucine Biosynthesis, I. Multi-Valent Repression". Proceedings of the National Academy of Sciences. 48 (10): 1804–1808. Bibcode:1962PNAS...48.1804F. doi:10.1073/pnas.48.10.1804. PMC 221043. PMID 13959618.
- Umbarger, H. E. (1964). "Intracellular Regulatory Mechanisms: Regulation in multicellular forms may be an elaboration upon the pattern evolved in microorganisms". Science. 145 (3633): 674–679. doi:10.1126/science.145.3633.674. ISSN 0036-8075. PMID 17754663. S2CID 22768508.
- Cortese, R.; Landsberg, R.; Vonder Haar, R. A.; Umbarger, H. E.; Ames, B. N. (1974). "Pleiotropy of hisT Mutants Blocked in Pseudouridine Synthesis in tRNA: Leucine and Isoleucine-Valine Operons". Proceedings of the National Academy of Sciences. 71 (5): 1857–1861. Bibcode:1974PNAS...71.1857C. doi:10.1073/pnas.71.5.1857. PMC 388341. PMID 4151955.
- McCorkle, G. M.; Leathers, T. D.; Umbarger, H. E. (1978). "Physical organization of the ilvEDAC genes of Escherichia coli strain K-12". Proceedings of the National Academy of Sciences. 75 (1): 89–93. Bibcode:1978PNAS...75...89M. doi:10.1073/pnas.75.1.89. PMC 411189. PMID 343113.
- Umbarger, H. E. (1978). "Amino Acid Biosynthesis and its Regulation". Annual Review of Biochemistry. 47: 533–606. doi:10.1146/annurev.bi.47.070178.002533. PMID 354503.
- Nargang, F. E.; Subrahmanyam, C. S.; Umbarger, H. E. (1980). "Nucleotide sequence of ilvGEDA operon attenuator region of Escherichia coli". Proceedings of the National Academy of Sciences. 77 (4): 1823–1827. Bibcode:1980PNAS...77.1823N. doi:10.1073/pnas.77.4.1823. PMC 348600. PMID 6990415.
