= Bial (disambiguation) =

Bial is a pharmaceutical company based in Portugal.

Bial or BIAL may also refer to:

== People with the surname ==
- Deborah Bial (born 1965), American educationist, founded the Posse Foundation
- Manfred Bial (1870–1908), German physician
- Pedro Bial (born 1958), Brazilian journalist, TV producer and presenter (hosts Brazil's Big Brother)
- Rudolf Bial, (1834–1881), German-American violinist, composer, impresario

== Other uses ==
- BIAL, Bengaluru International Airport in Bangalore, India
- BIAL IT Investment Region in Bangalore, India
- Piz Bial, a mountain in Switzerland
