= Baljet reaction =

Chemical reagent for testing cardenolides

The Baljet reaction is a qualitative and quantitative method of analysis published by Henri Baljet in 1918. This chemical reaction is used for the detection and colorimetric determination of cardenolides. To the sample, an aqueous hydroxide solution and an ethanolic picric acid solution are combined and added, with a positive test turning orange or red. The mechanism involves cardenolides 1 reacting in alkaline solution with picric acid 2 to form stabilized Meisenheimer complexes, as shown with the resonance form 3a to 3c:

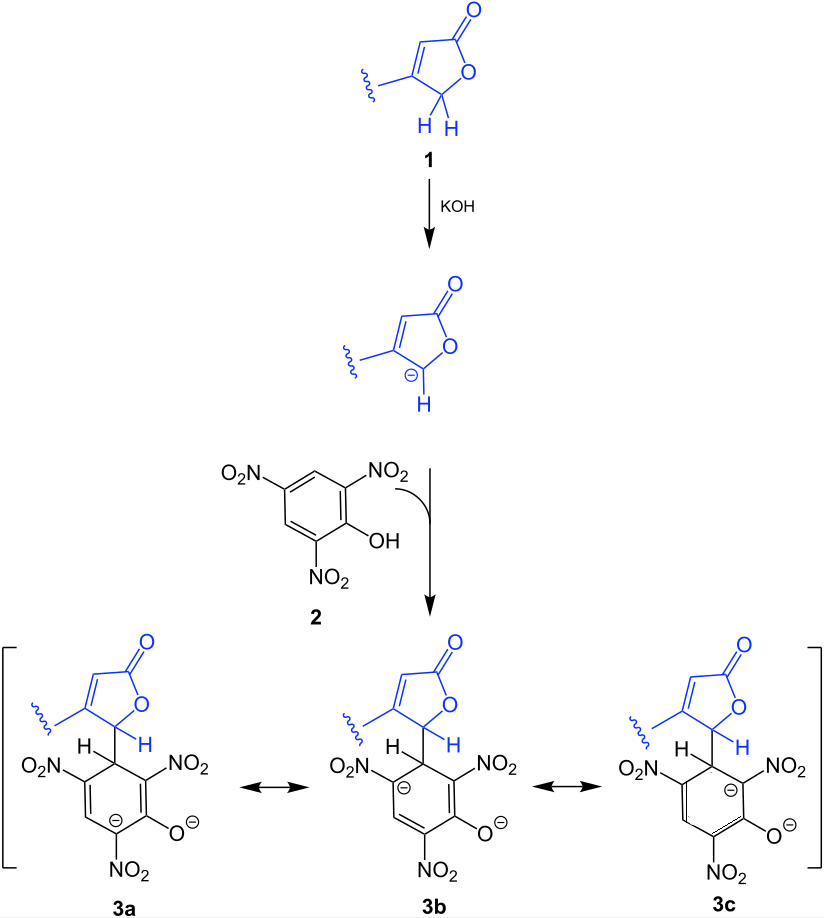
Baljet reaction

== See also ==
- Keller's reagent (organic)
- Dische test
