= Zacharias Dische =

American biochemist (1895–1988)

- Born: Zacharias Dische; 18 February 1895; Sambor, Galicia and Lodomeria, Austria-Hungary
- Died: 23 January 1988 (aged 92); Englewood, New Jersey, U.S.
- Education: University of Lemberg (Lviv)
- Known for: Regulation of glycolysis, feedback inhibition
- Children: Irene Dische, novelist
- Awards: Proctor Medal of the Association for Research in Ophthalmology (1965)
- Scientific career
- Fields: Biochemistry, ophthalmology
- Workplaces: Austro-Hungarian Army, University of Vienna, Aix-Marseille University, Columbia University

Zacharias Dische (18 February 1895 – 17 January 1988) was an American biochemist. He worked as a biochemical researcher in Vienna before being forced by the Anschluss to become a refugee, first in France and then in the US, where he joined the faculty of Columbia University in 1943. During his time in Marseille he made a major discovery that is little known and usually attributed to others.

== Life ==
Dische was born in Sambor, Kingdom of Galicia and Lodomeria, Austria-Hungary (present-day Ukraine) in a Jewish family.

This account of Dische's life before he moved to the United States is based on the Memorial Book for the Victims of National Socialism at the University of Vienna in 1938.

He enrolled at the Medical School of the University of Lemberg (Lviv) in 1913 and graduated in 1921, after service in the Austro-Hungarian Army, at the Medical School at the University of Vienna as Doctor of Medicine.

From 1924 he researched on intermediary metabolism of blood cells at the University of Vienna, and developed simple methods for determining the amount of sugars present in tissues, such as his diphenylamine assay, the Dische test, which is used to distinguish DNA from RNA. In 1931 he became assistant professor at the physiological department at the Philosophical School of the University of Vienna and head of the chemical laboratory.

He was persecuted by the Nazi government as a Jew: he lost his position and was expelled from the university in 1938. His mother, his sister and his grandmother died in concentration camps.

He was able to emigrate to France and worked temporarily in Paris, and after 1940 at the Department of Medical Chemistry at Aix-Marseille University. There he discovered feedback inhibition in metabolism, discussed in detail below.

In 1941 he moved to the US and worked as a research fellow at the Biochemistry Department the Columbia University College of Physicians and Surgeons. He was appointed assistant professor in 1948, associated professor in 1952, full professor in 1957 and emeritus professor and lecturer in 1963. From 1948 on he also was head of the chemical research department at the institute of ophthalmology.

In The Empress of Weehawken Dische's daughter, the novelist Irene Dische, has given a somewhat fictionalized account of his life in New Jersey. The film Zacharias (1986) that she directed is based on her father and refers to his situation in his old age.

Dische died on 17 January 1988 in Englewood, New Jersey.

== Feedback inhibition of glycolysis in liver cells ==
While working in Marseille, Dische discovered that glucose phosphorylation in human blood cells is inhibited by phosphoglycerates, a very surprising result as these are not the initial products of the hexokinase reaction, which catalyses the phosphorylation of glucose by ATP. This was the first report of feedback inhibition of a metabolic pathway, now recognized as a major mechanism of metabolic regulation. Moreover, Dische realized from the outset that this was more than just a curious observation, but one with implications for metabolic regulation, as now universally understood. Unfortunately, however, he was working in very difficult conditions as a Jewish refugee during wartime. Not only that, he published his results in French in a journal that was very little read and has now disappeared. As a consequence his paper passed almost unnoticed, though it was discussed favourably by Earl Stadtman, one of the most prominent biochemists of the US in the post-war years:

Dische was ahead of his time in pointing out that the phosphorylation of glucose is the first step in the biosynthesis of phosphoglycerate and that its inhibition by phosphoglycerate might constitute an important regulatory process in phosphoglycerate formation. This little known report appears to contain the first description of a recognized feedback control system.

Others, including Georges Cohen and Jacques Monod and colleagues, made similar assessments of Dische's contribution.

Nonetheless, despite these positive assessments by leading biochemists of the time, the discovery of feedback regulation is almost always attributed to two much more recent reports. Much later Edwin Umbarger, the author of one of these papers, wrote in a retrospective article that none of the people working on metabolic regulation in bacteria had been aware of Dische's work:

I do not think any of us working with bacterial systems were aware of the experiments of Zacharias Dische, who, during the time of the occupation of France, had shown a control of glucose phosphorylation in red cell lysates by the phosphoglycerates. Had his paper describing those experiments been more widely known, his experiments would certainly have had a seminal effect on the field.

Dische himself had earlier published a retrospective article about his discovery.

== Research on ophthalmology ==
Dische devoted most of the latter part of his career to work in ophthalmology, investigating, for example, the effects of light on transparent eye tissues.

== Medal ==
Dische was awarded the Proctor Medal of the Association for Research in Ophthalmology in 1965.
