= Manfred Bial =

German physician

Manfred Bial (10 December 1869 – 26 May 1908) was a German physician who invented a test for pentoses using orcinol, now known as Bial's test.

Bial was born on 10 December 1869 in Breslau, the son of Max Bial. He was an assistant at the Kaiserin-Augusta-Hospital in Berlin. Bial died on 26 May 1908 in Monaco.
