= Bial's test =

Chemical test

- Classification: Colorimetric method
- Analytes: Pentoses

Bial's test is a chemical test for the presence of pentoses originally developed for the diagnosis of pentosuria. It is named after Manfred Bial, a German physician. The components include orcinol, hydrochloric acid, and ferric chloride. A pentose, if present, will be dehydrated to form furfural which then reacts with orcinol to generate a colored substance. The solution will turn bluish and a precipitate may form. The solution shows two absorption bands, one in the red between Fraunhofer lines B and C and the other near the D line. An estimate of the relevant wavelengths can be made by referring to the Fraunhofer lines article.

== Composition ==

Bial's reagent consists of 0.4 g orcinol, 200 ml of concentrated hydrochloric acid and 0.5 ml of a 10% solution of ferric chloride. Bial's test is used to distinguish pentoses from hexoses; this distinction is based on the color that develops in the presence of orcinol and iron (III) chloride. Furfural from pentoses gives a blue or green color. The related hydroxymethylfurfural from hexoses may give a muddy-brown, yellow or gray solution, but this is easily distinguishable from the green color of pentoses.

== Quantitative version ==
The test may be performed as a quantitative colorimetric test using a spectrophotometer. Fernell and King published a procedure for simultaneous determination of pentoses and hexoses from measurements at two wavelengths. Various versions of this test are widely used for a quick chemical determination of RNA; in this context it is usually called the orcinol test.

== See also ==
- Dische test
