= Orcinol =

Names
- Preferred IUPAC name 5-Methylbenzene-1,3-diol
- Other names: 5-Methylresorcinol; 3,5-Toluenediol; Orcin; 5-Methyl-1,3-benzenediol; 3,5-Dihydroxytoluene

Identifiers
CAS Number	504-15-4
3D model (JSmol)	Interactive image
ChemSpider	13839080
ECHA InfoCard	100.007.259
PubChem CID	10436
UNII	534PMB3438
CompTox Dashboard (EPA)	DTXSID2060123
- InChI: InChI=1S/C7H8O2/c1-5-2-6(8)4-7(9)3-5/h2-4,8-9H,1H3 Key: OIPPWFOQEKKFEE-UHFFFAOYSA-N
- SMILES: CC1=CC(=CC(=C1)O)O

Properties
Chemical formula	C_{7}H_{8}O_{2}
Molar mass	124.139 g·mol^{−1}
Appearance	Crystalline solid
Melting point	109.0 °C (228.2 °F; 382.1 K)
Boiling point	291 °C (556 °F; 564 K)
Solubility in water	Miscible
- Except where otherwise noted, data are given for materials in their standard state (at 25 °C [77 °F], 100 kPa). verify (what is ?) Infobox references

Orcinol is an organic compound with the formula CH_{3}C_{6}H_{3}(OH)_{2}. It occurs in many species of lichens including Roccella tinctoria and Lecanora. Orcinol has been detected in the "toxic glue" of the ant species Camponotus saundersi. It is a colorless solid. It is related to resorcinol, 1,3-C_{6}H_{4}(OH)_{2}.

== Synthesis and reactions ==
Orcinol was first prepared by dehydroacetic acid, a conversion that involved ring-opening of the pyrone to a triketone. This early experiment helped establish the rich condensation chemistry of polyketides. It can be obtained by fusing extract of aloes with potash, followed by acidification.

It undergoes O-methylation with dimethylsulfate.

It is used in the production of the dye orcein and as a reagent in some chemical tests for pentoses, such as Bial's Test. It may be synthesized from toluene; more interesting is its production when acetone dicarboxylic ester is condensed with the aid of sodium. It crystallizes in colorless prisms with one molecule of water, which redden on exposure to air. Ferric chloride gives a bluish-violet coloration with the aqueous solution. Unlike resorcinol it does not give a fluorescein with phthalic anhydride. Oxidation of the ammoniacal solution gives orcein, C_{28}H_{24}N_{2}O_{7}, the chief constituent of the natural dye archil. 4-Methylcatechol is an isomer, found as its methyl ether (creosol) in beech-wood tar.

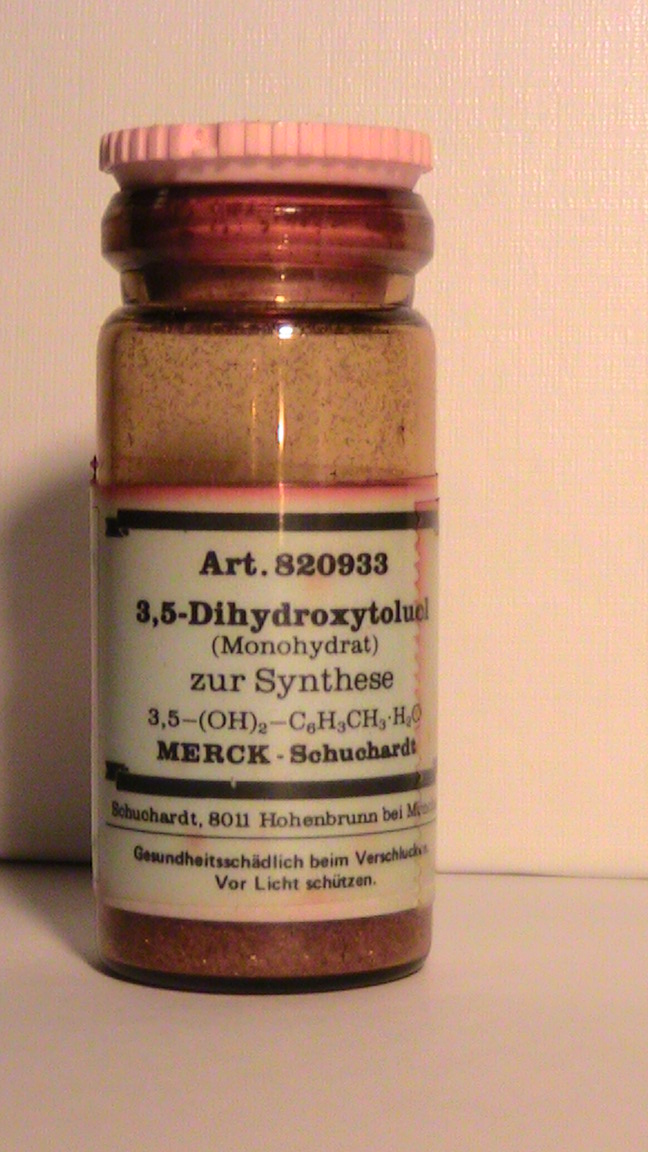
Orcinol

== Production from shale oil ==
Orcinol is also found in shale oil produced from Kukersite oil shale. It is the main water-soluble phenol in the oil, and has been extracted and refined industrially by Viru Keemia Grupp.

== See also ==
- Orcinol 2-monooxygenase
- Orsellinate decarboxylase
