= Diphenylamine (data page) =

Chemical data page

This page provides supplementary chemical data on diphenylamine.

== Physical data ==
- Vapour density: 5.82 (air = 1)
- Specific gravity: 1.16
