= Orsellinate decarboxylase =

Class of enzymes

Identifiers
- EC no.: 4.1.1.58
- CAS no.: 9076-58-8

Databases
- BRENDA: enzyme data
- ExPASy: NiceZyme view
- KEGG: enzyme entry
- MetaCyc: metabolic pathway
- Rhea: reactions
- PDB structures: RCSB PDB PDBe PDBsum
- Gene Ontology: AmiGO / QuickGO
Search
- PMC: articles
- PubMed: articles
- NCBI: proteins

Orsellinate decarboxylase (EC 4.1.1.58) is an enzyme characterised from Gliocladium roseum that catalyzes the decarboxylation of orsellinic acid to orcinol and carbon dioxide:

orsellinic acid
CO_{2}
orcinol

The enzyme is present in lichens, and has been studied for the reaction in the reverse direction, as a means of incorporating carbon dioxide, as bicarbonate, into resorcinol derivatives.

This enzyme is a lyase, specifically a carboxy-lyase, which cleave carbon-carbon bonds. The systematic name of this enzyme class is 2,4-dihydroxy-6-methylbenzoate carboxy-lyase (orcinol-forming). This enzyme is also called orsellinate carboxy-lyase.
