= Zhu Yu =

Zhu Yu may refer to:

- Zhu Yu (artist) (born 1970), controversial modern Chinese artist
- Zhu Yu (author), Chinese author of the medieval Song Dynasty
- Zhu Yu (footballer) (born 1997), Chinese footballer
