= Entozoa =

Historical taxon

Entozoa is an obsolete taxonomic term that historically referred to a group of parasitic animals that live inside the bodies of other organisms. It was originally used in older classifications to describe various internal parasites, including parasitic worms (like tapeworms and roundworms) and some protozoans. The term was coined by Swedish-German naturalist Karl Rudolfi in 1808 and is considered obsolete and no longer used in modern taxonomy.
