= Creosol =

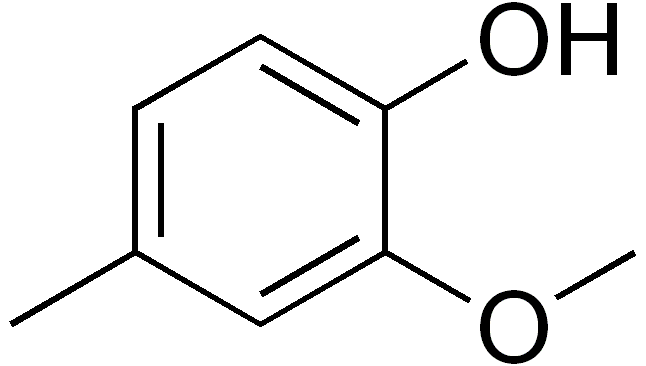

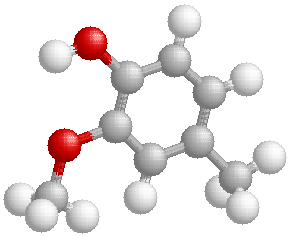

Names
- Preferred IUPAC name 2-Methoxy-4-methylphenol
- Other names 4-Methylguaiacol; Valspice

Identifiers
CAS Number	93-51-6
3D model (JSmol)	Interactive image
ChemSpider	21105936
ECHA InfoCard	100.002.049
PubChem CID	7144
UNII	W9GW1KZG6N
CompTox Dashboard (EPA)	DTXSID6047105
- InChI: InChI=1S/C8H10O2/c1-6-3-4-7(9)8(5-6)10-2/h3-5,9H,1-2H3 Key: PETRWTHZSKVLRE-UHFFFAOYSA-N; InChI=1/C8H10O2/c1-6-3-4-7(9)8(5-6)10-2/h3-5,9H,1-2H3 Key: PETRWTHZSKVLRE-UHFFFAOYAK
- SMILES: Oc1ccc(C)cc1OC

Properties
Chemical formula	C_{8}H_{10}O_{2}
Molar mass	138.16 g/mol
Appearance	Colorless to yellowish aromatic liquid
Density	1.0966 g/cm^{3} (20 °C)
Melting point	5.5 °C (41.9 °F; 278.6 K)
Boiling point	221 °C (430 °F; 494 K)
Solubility in water	Slightly soluble
Solubility in ethanol, ether, benzene	Miscible
Refractive index (n_{D})	1.5373 (20 °C)
- Except where otherwise noted, data are given for materials in their standard state (at 25 °C [77 °F], 100 kPa). verify (what is ?) Infobox references

Creosol is a chemical compound with the molecular formula C_{8}H_{10}O_{2}. It is one of the components of creosote. Compared with phenol, creosol is a less toxic disinfectant.

== Sources ==
Sources of creosol include:

- Coal tar creosote
- Wood creosote
- Reduction product of vanillin using zinc powder in strong hydrochloric acid (Clemmensen reduction)
- Found as glycosides in green vanilla beans
- It is also found in tequila.

== Reactions ==
Creosol reacts with hydrogen halides to give a catechol.

== See also ==
- Vanillin, a related phenol
