= Diphenylamine =

- Skeletal formula

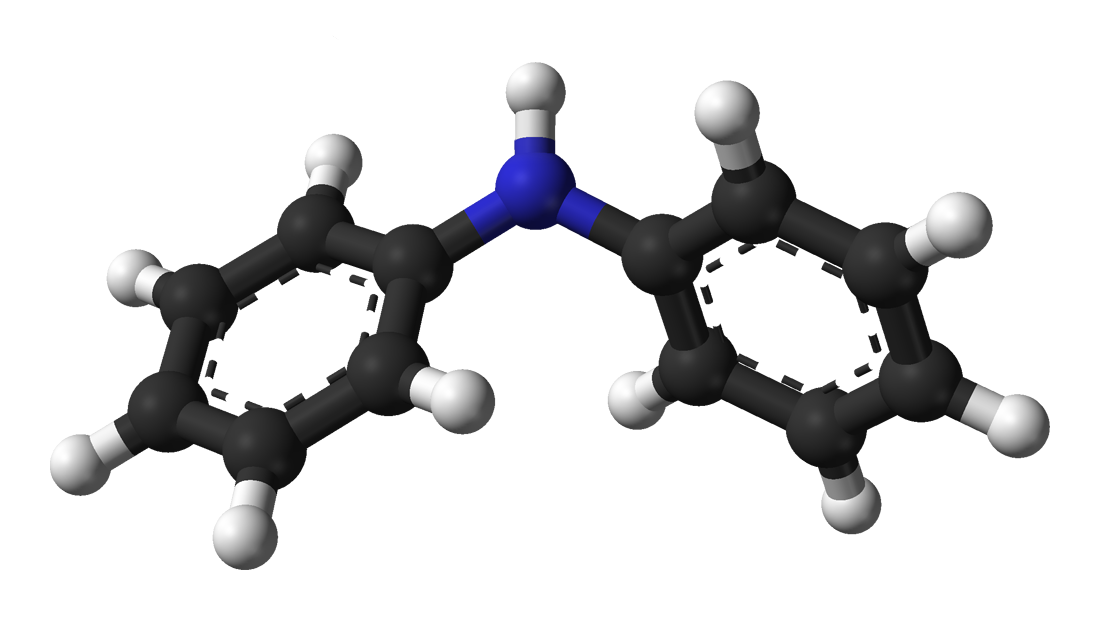
- Ball-and-stick model

Names
- Preferred IUPAC name N-Phenylaniline
- Other names (Diphenyl)amine; Diphenylamine (deprecated); Diphenylazane; N-Phenylbenzenamine; Anilinobenzene (Phenylamino)benzene; N,N-Diphenylamine; C.I. 10355; Phenylbenzenamine

Identifiers
CAS Number	122-39-4
3D model (JSmol)	Interactive image
Abbreviations	DPA; Ph_{2}NH
Beilstein Reference	508755
ChEBI	CHEBI:4640
ChEMBL	ChEMBL38688
ChemSpider	11003
ECHA InfoCard	100.004.128
EC Number	204-539-4
Gmelin Reference	67833
KEGG	C11016
PubChem CID	11487
RTECS number	JJ7800000
UNII	9N3CBB0BIQ
UN number	2811 3077
CompTox Dashboard (EPA)	DTXSID4021975
- InChI: InChI=1S/C12H11N/c1-3-7-11(8-4-1)13-12-9-5-2-6-10-12/h1-10,13H Key: DMBHHRLKUKUOEG-UHFFFAOYSA-N; InChI=1/C12H11N/c1-3-7-11(8-4-1)13-12-9-5-2-6-10-12/h1-10,13H Key: DMBHHRLKUKUOEG-UHFFFAOYAJ
- SMILES: c1ccc(cc1)Nc2ccccc2

Properties
Chemical formula	C_{12}H_{11}N
Molar mass	169.227 g·mol^{−1}
Appearance	White, off-white
Odor	Floral
Density	1.2 g/cm^{3}
Melting point	53 °C (127 °F; 326 K)
Boiling point	302 °C (576 °F; 575 K)
Solubility in water	0.03%
Vapor pressure	1 mmHg (108 °C)
Acidity (pK_{a})	0.79 of conjugate acid (Ph_{2}NH_{2}^{+})
Magnetic susceptibility (χ)	−109.7·10^{−6} cm^{3}/mol

Hazards
- Occupational safety and health (OHS/OSH)
Main hazards	Toxic. Possible mutagen. Possible teratogen. Harmful in contact with skin, and if swallowed or inhaled. Irritant.
- GHS labelling
Pictograms	(GHS06: Toxic) (GHS07: Exclamation mark) (GHS08: Health hazard) (GHS09: Environmental hazard)
Signal word	Danger
Hazard statements	H301, H311, H319, H331, H373, H410
Precautionary statements	P260, P264, P270, P271, P273, P280, P301+P310, P302+P352, P304+P340, P305+P351+P338, P311, P312, P314, P321, P322, P330, P337+P313, P361, P363, P391, P403+P233, P405, P501
NFPA 704 (fire diamond)	3 1 0
Flash point	153 °C 152 °C (306 °F; 425 K)
Autoignition temperature	634 °C
- NIOSH (US health exposure limits)
PEL (Permissible)	none
REL (Recommended)	TWA 10 mg/m^{3}
IDLH (Immediate danger)	N.D.

Related compounds
Related Amine	Aniline

Supplementary data page
- Diphenylamine (data page)
- Except where otherwise noted, data are given for materials in their standard state (at 25 °C [77 °F], 100 kPa). verify (what is ?) Infobox references

Diphenylamine is an organic compound with the formula (C_{6}H_{5})_{2}NH. The compound is a derivative of aniline, consisting of an amine bound to two phenyl groups. The compound is a colorless solid, but commercial samples are often yellow due to oxidized impurities. Diphenylamine dissolves well in many common organic solvents, and is moderately soluble in water. It is used mainly for its antioxidant properties. Diphenylamine is widely used as an industrial antioxidant, dye mordant and reagent and is also employed in agriculture as a fungicide and antihelmintic.

== Preparation and reactivity ==
Diphenylamine is produced by heating a mixture of aniline and anilinium chloride:

C_{6}H_{5}NH_{2} + C_{6}H_{5}NH_{3}Cl → (C_{6}H_{5})_{2}NH + NH_{4}Cl

It is a weak base, with a K_{b} of 10^{−14}. With strong acids, it forms salts. For example, treatment with sulfuric acid gives the bisulfate [(C_{6}H_{5})_{2}NH_{2}]^{+}[HSO_{4}]^{−} as a white or yellowish powder with m.p. 123–125 °C (253–257 °F).

Diphenylamine undergoes various cyclisation reactions. With sulfur, it gives phenothiazine, a precursor to pharmaceuticals.

(C_{6}H_{5})_{2}NH + 2 S → S(C_{6}H_{4})_{2}NH + H_{2}S

Oxidative dehydrogenation give carbazole:

(C_{6}H_{5})_{2}NH + 0.5 O_{2} → (C_{6}H_{4})_{2}NH + H_{2}O

Arylation with iodobenzene gives triphenylamine.

== Applications ==
=== Testing for DNA ===
The Dische test uses diphenylamine to test for DNA, and can be used to distinguish DNA from RNA.

=== Apple scald inhibitor ===
Diphenylamine is used as a pre- or postharvest scald inhibitor for apples applied as an indoor drench treatment. Apple scald is physical injury that manifests in brown spots after fruit is removed from cold storage. Diphenylamine's anti-scald activity is the result of its antioxidant properties, which protect the apple skin from the oxidation products of α-farnesene during storage.

=== Stabilizer for smokeless powder ===
In the manufacture of smokeless powder, diphenylamine is commonly used as a stabilizer, such that the gunshot residue analysis seeks to quantify traces of diphenylamine. Diphenylamine functions by binding nitrogen oxide degradation products, forming compounds like nitrodiphenylamine. In this way, DPA prevents these degradation products from accelerating further degradation.

=== Antioxidant ===
Alkylated diphenylamines function as antioxidants in lubricants, approved for use in machines, in which contact with food is not ruled out. Alkylated diphenylamines and other derivatives are used as antiozonants in the manufacture of rubber products, reflecting the antioxidant nature of aniline derivatives.

=== Redox indicator ===
Many diphenylamine derivatives are used as redox indicators that are particularly useful in alkaline redox titrations. The diphenylaminesulfonic acid is a simple prototype redox indicator, owing to its improved aqueous solubility compared with diphenylamine. Attempts have been made to explain the color changes associated with the oxidation of diphenylamine.

In a related application, diphenylamine is oxidized by nitrate to give a similar blue coloration in the diphenylamine test for nitrates.

=== Thin-layer chromatography reagent ===
Can be used as staining reagent in thin-layer chromatography for vizualisation of carbohydrates, glycolipids, nitrosamines, and pesticides, for the detection of certain peroxides, particularly explosives.

=== Dyes ===
Several azo dyes like Metanil Yellow, Disperse Orange 1, and Acid orange 5 are derivatives of diphenylamine. It is also used as a dye mordant. A dye mordant is any substance that helps dyes to adhere to fabrics.

== History ==
Diphenylamine was discovered by A. W. Hofmann in 1864 amongst the products of dry distillation of aniline dyes; it was first purposefully synthesized through deamination of a mix of aniline and its salts by a group of French chemists two years later.

In 1872, diphenylamine was suggested as a means to detect nitrous acid in sulfuric acid due to its blue coloration in the presence of oxidizing agents. By 1875, it was also being used to detect nitrites and nitrates in drinking water.

In 1924, diphenylamine is discovered to be useful in detecting DNA via the Dische test by Zacharias Dische. In 1947, diphenylamine was registered in the US as a pesticide.

== Toxicity ==
In animal experiments diphenylamine was rapidly and completely absorbed after ingestion by mouth. It underwent metabolism to sulfonyl and glucuronyl conjugates and was rapidly excreted mainly via urine. Acute oral and dermal toxicity were low. Diphenylamine can cause severe irritation to the eyes. It was not a skin irritant, and it has not been technically feasible to test acute toxicity study by inhalation. Diphenylamine targets the red blood cell system and can cause abnormal erythropoiesis in the spleen, and thus congestion of the spleen, and haemosiderosis. Changes in liver and kidneys were found upon longer exposure. At clear toxic doses of parent animals reproductive effects were limited to reduced implantation sites in F1 females associated with reduced rat litter size, implicating a possible mutagenic or teratogenic effect. No effect on development could be attributed. The U.S. CDC's NIOSH lists the following symptoms of poisoning: irritation eyes, skin, mucous membrane; eczema; tachycardia, hypertension; cough, sneezing; methemoglobinemia; increased blood pressure and heart rate; proteinuria, hematuria (blood in the urine), bladder injury; in animals: teratogenic effects.

The short-term NOAEL of 9.6 – 10 mg/kg bw/day was derived from 90-day rat, 90-day dog and 1-year dog studies and the long-term NOAEL was 7.5 mg/kg bw/day. The Acceptable Daily Intake of diphenylamine was 0.075 mg/kg bw/day based on the 2-year rat study, applying a safety factor of 100; the Acceptable Operator Exposure Level was 0.1 mg/kg bw/day.

In a study of diphenylamine metabolism in harvested and dipped apples at different time intervals it was observed that radiolabelled residues of diphenylamine penetrate from the surface into the pulp, which after 40 weeks contained 32% of the residue. Diphenylamine was always the major residue, but 3 metabolites were found in good amounts in the apple samples, whose identification experts considered insufficient.(Kim-Kang, H. 1993. Metabolism of 14C-diphenylamine in stored apples—nature of the residue in plants. Report RPT00124. Study XBL 91071. XenoBiotic Laboratories, Inc., USA, unpublished) cited in There is a data gap on presence or formation of nitrosamines in apple metabolism or during processing. The carcinogen 4-Aminobiphenyl can accompany diphenylamine as an impurity.

Diphenylamine has low acute and short-term toxicity to birds, but is very toxic to aquatic organisms. Risk to biological methods of sewage treatment was assessed as low.

The impurity in commercial diphenylamine which induces polycystic kidney disease in rats was identified in 1981. Laboratory studies with highly purified diphenylamine indicated that the impurity can be formed by heating diphenylamine.

== Environmental fate ==
Diphenylamine is considered practically insoluble according to the 2014 MSDS. It exhibits very low persistence in direct water photolysis experiments in the laboratory and is moderately volatile. Indirect photooxidation in the atmosphere through reaction with hydroxyl radicals was estimated. Despite limited data, the information was sufficient for the EC to characterize the environmental risk as negligible, because the intended use of diphenylamine was indoors.

=== Residues in fruit and alternatives ===
Of 744 apples tested USDA found 82.7% of them to have diphenylamine residue between 0.005 - 4.3 ppm, below the U.S. EPA's tolerance level of 10ppm. A number of alternatives to the use of diphenylamine exist for the control of scald of apples.

== Regulation ==
=== Europe ===
The EC set maximum residue levels for diphenylamine in 2005. (Annex II and Part B of Annex III to Regulation (EC) No 396/2005). Diphenylamine was one of 84 substances of a European Commission (EC) review program covered by a regulation from 2002 requiring the European Food Safety Authority (EFSA) upon EC request to organize a peer review of the initial evaluation, i.e. a draft risk assessment, and to provide the EC within 6 months with a conclusion. The assessment, received by the EFSA in 2007 started the peer review in October 2007 by dispatching it for consultation of the EC member states and the applicants, the two manufacturers, Cerexagri s.a., Italian subsidiary of United Phosphorus Ltd (UPL), and Pace International LLC. As a result of the peer review, mostly lacking data about risk to consumers, and particularly the levels and toxicity of unidentified metabolites of the substance, the possible formation of nitrosamines during storage of the active substance and during processing of treated apples, and the lack of data on the potential breakdown product of diphenylamine residues in processed commodities, the EC decided on 30 November 2009 to withdraw authorizations for plant protection products containing diphenylamine.(2009/859/EC)

The 'European Diphenylamine Task Force' resubmitted an application to the EC with more data, and an additional report was received by the EFSA on 3 December 2010. EFSA concluded the risk assessment did not eliminate the concerns on 5 December 2011, published this opinion in 2012 and it became law in 2013.

=== WHO/FAO joint committee ===
The committee established an acceptable daily intake of 0.02 mg/kg/day in a meeting on pesticide residues.

=== US EPA ===
After passage of the Food Quality Protection Act (FQPA) of 1996, the U.S. EPA had established a tolerance level for apples at 10 ppm, and for meat and milk at 0 ppm. The tentative LOAEL was 10 mg/kg/day In 1997 EPA approved the reregistration of diphenylamine, and determined that recommended tolerances met the safety standards under FQPA and that "adequate data indicate that tolerances for residues in milk and meat could be increased from 0.0 ppm and established as separate tolerances set at 0.01 ppm". EPA has not reviewed diphenylamine since then.
