= Edward A. Adelberg =

American geneticist (1920–2009)

Edward Allen Adelberg (1920–2009) was a founder of microbial genetics and biochemist who spent much of his career at Yale University. He was a member of the National Academy of Sciences and co-author of influential textbooks.

== Early life and education ==
Adelberg was born on December 6, 1920, in Cedarhurst, New York. He was the son of Max and Janet (Ehrlich) Adelberg, and the grandson of Abraham Adelberg, a Russian immigrant who was a founder and early mayor of Cedarhurst. His maternal grandfather, David Ehrlich, was a first cousin to Paul Ehrlich, inventor of immunology and recipient of the 1908 Nobel Prize in Medicine.

Adelberg attended Woodmere Academy before entering Yale University as an undergraduate in 1938. He received a BS in plant science from Yale in 1942.

He served as a meteorology officer in the US Army Air Force from 1942 to 1946, stationed in the western Pacific. By war’s end, he held the rank of major in command of a weather squadron of 400 men.

In 1946, he returned to Yale as a graduate student in the newly formed Microbiology Department. He studied under Edward Tatum, who discovered the “one gene-one enzyme” relationship for which he shared a Nobel Prize in 1958. Adelberg followed Tatum to Stanford University in 1948 and completed his Ph.D. there on the biosynthesis of isoleucine in 1949 (the degree was awarded by Yale).

== Academic career ==
Adelberg joined the Department of Bacteriology at the University of California at Berkeley as an Instructor in 1949. He rose to become Chair of the Department in 1957 and Full Professor in 1960.

While at Berkeley, he authored and edited three influential textbooks, Medical Microbiology (with Ernest Jawetz and Joseph Melnick) in 1954; The Microbial World (with Roger Stanier and Michael Douderoff) in 1957; and Papers on Bacterial Genetics in 1960. As of 2022, Medical Microbiology was in its 28th edition and had been translated in several languages. The Microbial World, which was reissued in three subsequent editions, has been described as “the seminal microbiology textbook that shattered the microbiology world”.

In 1961, he returned to Yale University as Professor of Microbiology. He chaired the Microbiology Department from 1961 to 1964 and from 1967 to 1971. He held a dual appointment as Professor of Molecular Biology and Biophysics from 1962 to 1966, and joined the Department of Human Genetics, which he helped organize, in 1972. He was also active in administration at the university level, serving as the university’s director of Biological Sciences from 1964–69, and Deputy Provost for Biomedical Sciences from 1983 to his retirement in 1991. The University brought him out of retirement to serve, first, as acting director of the Office of University Safety, and subsequently as acting director of the Peabody Museum.

Over the course of his 42-year academic career, Adelberg published over 200 papers in five research areas: (1) the biosynthesis of amino acids isoleucine and valine in Neurospora and Escherichia coli; (2) genetic regulation of amino acid biosynthesis in E. coli: (3) mechanisms of mutation in bacteria; (4) the bacterial chromosome, sex factors, and conjugations; and (5) membrane transport in cultured mammalian cells.

Adelberg's early work on pathways for biosynthesis of amino acids led to his 1953 groundbreaking discovery with HE Umbarger (then at Harvard University) that the end-product of a biosynthetic pathway could regulate the rate of its own biosynthesis, a process known as “feedback inhibition”.

Adelberg's early research on bacterial conjugation also helped lay the groundwork for the field of recombinant DNA and genetic engineering. Following a sabbatical working with Francois Jacob at the Pasteur Institute in 1956-57, Adelberg discovered the phenomenon known variously as “F-mediated transduction,” “F-duction,” and sexduction, which consists of the transfer through recombination of chromosomal fragments by the sex factor (F) during bacterial conjugation. Subsequent research led to his establishing that chromosomes in all cells of E. Coli K12 were circular, regardless of type.

Building on this work, Herbert Boyer, a post-doctoral fellow in Adelberg’s laboratory at Yale in 1963-66, conducted research on restriction and modification in bacterial conjugation which led to the founding of the first biotech company, Genentech, and to the Boyer-Cohen method of gene-splicing.

In addition to authoring seminal textbooks, Adelberg helped advance the field of microbial genetics by co-developing the system of nomenclature which has been adopted by all E. coli geneticists,; and by establishing the Escherichia Coli Genetic Stock Center at Yale. The Center maintains a collection of about 28,000 cultures of genetically defined derivatives of E. coli K-12. The cultures are distributed to researchers and educators throughout the US and in over 65 countries worldwide. The Center also provides information about strains, mutations, genes, gene products and genetic maps, in a fully searchable database on the web.

== Honors and recognition ==
- Member, National Academy of Sciences (elected 1971)
- Fellow, American Academy of Arts & Sciences (elected 1964)
- Guggenheim Fellowships (1956–57; 1965–66)
- Chairman, Advisory Board, Rosenstiel Center for Bio-Medical Research, Brandeis University (1971–74)
- Editor, Bacteriological Reviews (1966–69)
- Editor, Journal of Bacteriology (1964)
- Board of Governors, American Society of Microbiology (1969–72)
- Member, National Institutes of Health Recombinant DNA Molecule Program Advisory Committee (1975)
- Trustee, Marine Biology Laboratory, Woods Hole, Mass. (1984–87)
- Edward A. Adelberg Annual Lecture in Genetics at Yale University School of Medicine created in his honor (1991)
- Executive Editor, CASE (Connecticut Academy of Science Engineering) Reports (1991-2001)

== Personal life ==
Adelberg died at 88 on August 7, 2009.
