= Dische test =

Chemical test

The Dische test, or Dische reaction, is used to distinguish DNA from RNA. It was invented by Zacharias Dische.

== Method ==
Dische's diphenylamine reagent consists of diphenylamine, glacial acetic acid, sulfuric acid, and ethanol.

When heated with DNA, it turns blue in the presence of DNA. A more intense blue color indicates a greater concentration of DNA.

== Mechanism ==
The acid converts deoxyribose to a molecule that binds with diphenylamine to form a blue substance. The reagent does not interact with RNA, so can be used to distinguish DNA from RNA.

== See also ==
- Bial's test
