= Seirogan =

Pharmaceutical drug for treating digestive tracts

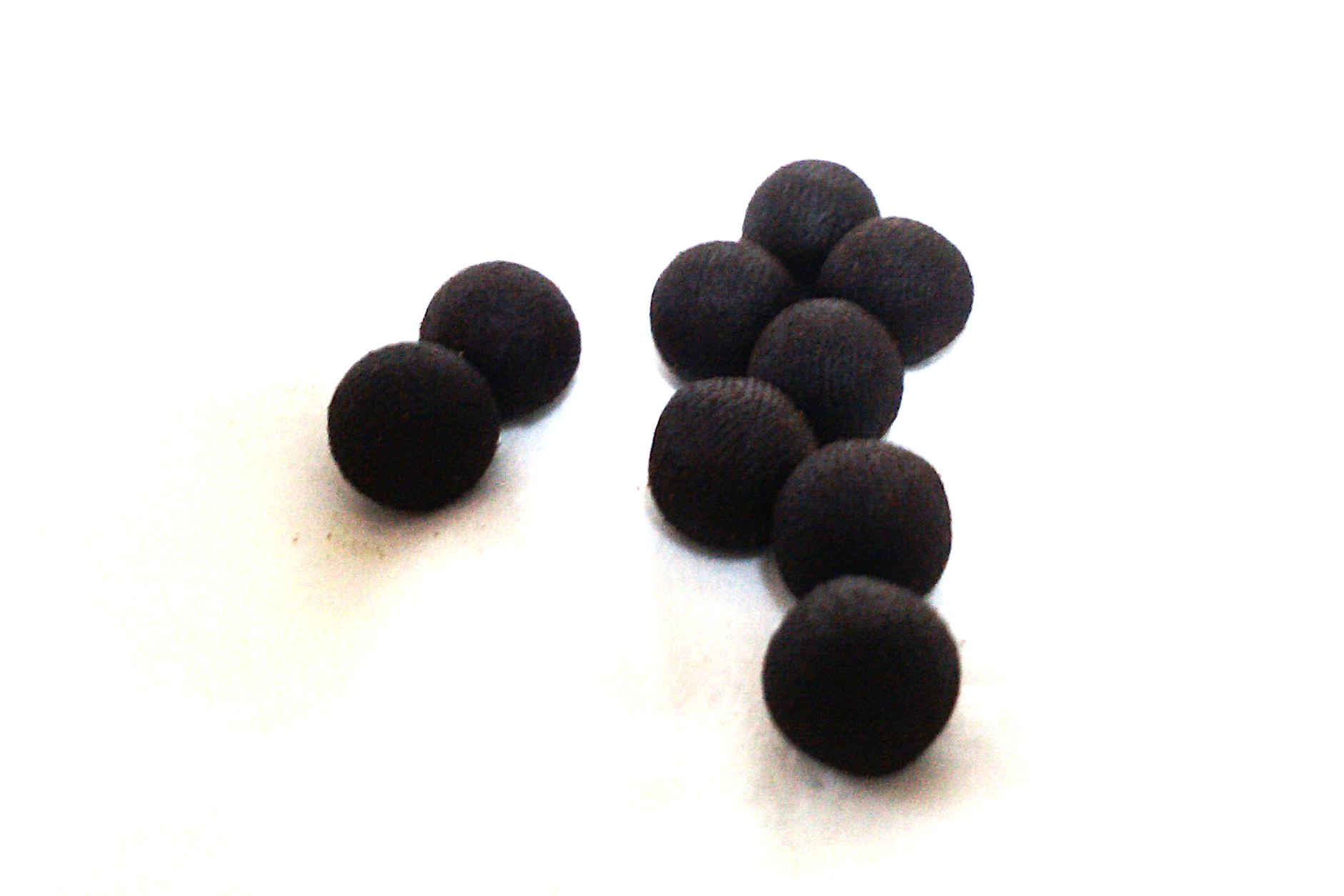
- Seirogan

Combination of
- Wood-tar creosote: Possible antidiarrheal
- Kampo: N/A

Clinical data
- Trade names: Seirogan
- Routes of administration: oral

Identifiers
- CAS Number: 852395-11-0

Seirogan (Japanese: 正露丸, formerly 征露丸) is a pharmaceutical drug marketed in Japan as a treatment for the digestive tract (especially as an antidiarrhoeal), whose main active ingredient is wood-tar creosote.

The name is nominally a registered trademark of Taiko Pharmaceutical (大幸薬品, Taikō Yakuhin) based in Suita, Osaka which is still the major market-share holder, but the enforceability of the tradename has been voided by the Supreme Court of Japan, which ruled seirogan to be a common generic name. The ruling only recognizes proprietary use of the bugle logo by Taiko, but not protection of its characteristic packaging. As a result, dozens of extremely similar packaged drugs are being manufactured and sold in the market.

== Medical uses ==
Seirogan is a general-use medicine, mainly to treat the gastro-intestinal system.

Seirogan has been claimed to be effective in the treatment of the following conditions:

1. Treating and allaying stomach aches, diarrhea, diarrhea due to digestive disorders, food poisoning, vomiting, water contamination (Montezuma's revenge), runny bowels warning of diarrhea, soft stool.
2. Regulating stomach and intestines condition.
3. Pulpitis-caused tooth cavity aches.

In pre-World War II Japan, Seirogan was believed to combat tuberculosis or aid someone with a weak constitution, and employed as a panacea (cure-all) of sorts.

=== Available forms ===
Ingredient list supplied with three Seirogan products
Brand Entry	Taiko	Izumi	Izumi
Wood-tar creosote JP (mg)	400	275	400
Catechu powder JP (mg) (asenyaku (阿仙薬))	200	0	0
Amur corktree bark powder JP (mg) (ōbaku (黄檗))	300	99	150
Chinese liquorice root powder JP (mg) (kanzō (甘草))	150	165	250
chenpi (陳皮, chimpi)) powder (mg)	100	105	100
Japanese belladonna extract JP (mg) (rōto (ロート))	0	19.8	0
Cinnamon powder JP (mg)	(listed as inactive)	49.5	100
gentian root powder JP (mg) (genchiana (ゲンチアナ))	0	0	100
Inactive ingredients	Cinnamon, CMC-Ca, glycerine	baking soda, glycerine, wheat starch	glycerine, rice starch
Manufacturer	Taiko Pharmaceutical	Izumi Yakuhin Kogyou	Matsumoto Pharmaceutical Manufacture Co., Ltd.

== Chemistry ==
Seirogan contains wood-tar creosote (木クレオソート) as its main active ingredient. That ingredient in the West may otherwise go by such names as "wood creosote", "beechwood creosote", or "liquid pitch oil", and should be distinguished from industrial "coal-tar creosote". To emphasize the distinction, wood creosote in Japan is sometimes called by such names as Nikkyokuhō kureosōto (日局方クレオソート; "Japanese Pharmacopoeia creosote") and minor variants thereof. In contemporary European usage, wood-tar creosote has been used for "antiseptic" and "calming" purposes.

A singular randomized controlled trial finds wood creosote about as effective as loperamide in American and Mexican subjects. Compared to loperamide, wood creosote seems to be better at improving cramps but worse at improving diarrhea. Instead its well-known ex vivo antiseptic action, animal studies suggest that wood creosote's antisecretory and antimotility effects play a larger role in its activity against diarrhea.

The wood creosote is blended with two or more crude medicines (生薬, shōyaku) recognized in Kanpō (漢方薬, kanpōyaku) for their supposed antiseptic and other effects, but the additional ingredients used are different among manufacturers (See under § Chemical composition for a sampling of formulas). Kanpō medicine practitioners insist however that "Seirogan is not strictly speaking kanpō medicine", and this point was emphatically printed in a retraction by a certain consumer-watch type book that criticized seirogan but had confused wood creosote with the industrial type (See § Coal tar controversy).

In the classic form, it is a dark brown round pill, but in order to mask its distinctive medicinal odor and bitterness, sugar-coated tablet forms have become available as well.

== History ==
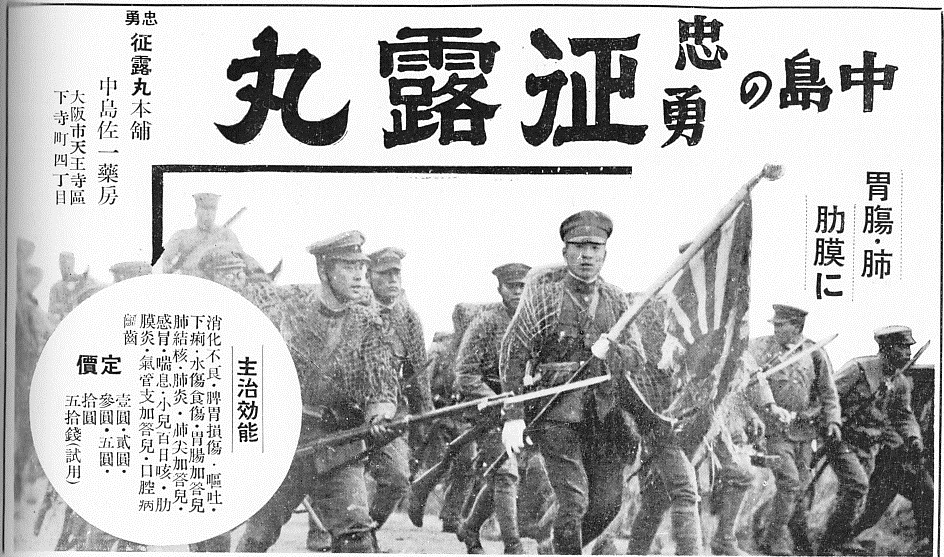
Advertisement for Seirogan, 1930s

There are several contending theories regarding the origins of the drug, and several names crop up as its inventor.

The Japanese Imperial Army, which experienced considerable setbacks due to unclean water sources during the Sino-Japanese War at the end of the 19th century, was working on solutions to combat infectious diseases. Surgeon-major Michitomo Tozuka (戸塚機知), an instructor at the Military Medical College, discovered in 1903 that creosote agent was an effective suppressant for the typhoid fever pathogen. Taiko Pharmaceutical claims the Osaka-based medicine merchant Saichi Nakajima (中島佐一) developed the Chūyū Seirogan (忠勇征露丸) a year earlier in 1902 and initiated sales, which business was eventually handed over to Taiko.

The higher echelons of the Army Medical Corps, including writer Mori Ōgai, favored the German view that beriberi, a disease that caused an even heavier death toll than typhoid, was caused by an undiscovered transmittable pathogen (in contrast, British-trained doctors in the navy correctly saw it as a nutritional disorder). Prompted by their misguided view, the army distributed vast quantities of Seirogan (with their proven antiseptic properties) among the troops to be administered daily throughout the Russo-Japanese War of 1904–05. In an army medical journal of 1901 there is mention of the pill as Kureosōto gan (クレオソート丸), but in the journals of 1904–05 appears the name Seirogan (征露丸; "Conquer Russia pills"). The name Seirogan was widely used as the academic term by army doctors for about a 4-year span.

But this was in the days when drug use as preventive medicine was not a widely embraced concept, and soldiers resisted swallowing this weird-smelling and unfamiliar pill, even when so instructed. The top brass decided to invoke the name of Emperor Meiji, telling the men that taking the pill was "according to the wishes of His Imperial Majesty". This subterfuge reportedly greatly improved the soldiers' compliance towards taking the pill, making them less prone to be forced out of action due to stomach aches or diarrhea. The army doctors were however disappointed to find that the pill did not show any of the desired combative effect towards the (non-existent) beriberi microbe. The army insisted on feeding their men pure white rice to boost morale, but that led to vitamin-deficient diet, so that one in three men serving the Russo-Japanese War were afflicted by beriberi, and 27,800 succumbed to it. Meanwhile, the Japanese navy deduced early on that beriberi was a nutritional disorder, and added breads and mugimeshi (麦飯) (wheat or wheat-rice mixture steam-cooked like rice) to their rations, so that none of their servicemen fell ill with beriberi.

While Seirogan proved powerless against beriberi, the antidiarrheal and toothache-soothing properties of the pill were passed on, in somewhat exaggerated fashion, by repatriated war veterans. Amid the mood of victory in war, Seirogan's name became "the cure-all that defeated Russia" and many drug-makers rushed to manufacture the pill, which became a national medicine unique to Japan.

The reputation for the pill's effectiveness also spread within areas under Japanese control before the end of World War II, and Seirogan is said to be one of the popular items purchased by travelers from Taiwan, Hong Kong, the People's Republic of China, and other Asian countries.

The pill ceased to be part of regular military issue supplies in 1906, but the military continued to keep itself constantly supplied for use. In 2007, it was part of the supply kit issued to the SDF during the UN Mission in Nepal.

After the war with Russia, and again after World War II, administrative guidance was issued against the use of the kanji character Sei (征; "conquer") as being undesirable from the standpoint of international relations. So in most cases, the written name of the pill was changed to 正露丸 ("right dew pill"). Taiko Pharmaceutical made the change in 1949. But one manufacturer, Nihon Iyakuhin Seizō (日本医薬品製造), still uses the old written form that reads "conquer".

== Trademark dispute ==
The Seirogan (正露丸) name was filed for trademark registration by Taiko Pharmaceutical in 1954, but approximately thirty competitors such as Izumi Yakuhin Kogyou Co., Ltd. objected, leading to a lengthy battle, petitioning the Patent Office, then later litigating in court. The Tokyo District Court rejected Taiko's claim to proprietary use of the Seirogan name, and the Supreme Court of Japan upheld that decision in 1974. The Supreme Court delivered the opinion that the name seirogan had passed into a common noun, so that use of the Seirogan (正露丸) name by any company was valid, not answerable to the claims of this trademark, and did not constitute an infringement of any intellectually property rights thereof. The court also did not recognize Taiko Pharmaceutical's exclusive right to use the distinctive color scheme and graphic design on the packaged box (and sticker label on the pill bottle), with the exception of the product logo depicting a bugle (cf. §Taiko's trademark registration and Izumi's lawsuit to revoke trademark).

As a consequence, there are currently numerous Seirogan products in the market that feature logos other than the bugle but otherwise look remarkably similar: Izumi Yakuhin Kogyou (calabash logo), Kyokuto Co., Ltd. (triangle and bear logo, nicknamed Yūtan). The retailer/drug store chain Fujiyakuhin Co., Ltd. and wholesaler Fujiyakuhin Co., Ltd. also market their own brands.

In 2005, Taiko filed a lawsuit against a competitor, demanding suppression of what it considered copycat merchandise, but again lost the case in court, and the Supreme Court rejected the appeal in 2008 (cf. §Taiko's petition for an injunction against unfair competitive practices).

=== Taiko's trademark registration and Izumi's lawsuit to revoke trademark ===
In 1946, Taiko Pharmaceutical the leading manufacturer of the pill, had obtained through formal negotiation with Saichi Nakajima the right to continue selling his "Chūyū Seirogan" pill. Accordingly, in 1954, Taiko made a claim for the exclusive use of the "Seirogan" name, and filed for trademark registration.

Other manufacturers of the seirogan-type pill objected to this move, led by Izumi Yakuhin Kogyou Co., Ltd., which had developed its own creosote formula, and had supplied the military with its seirogan throughout World War II despite supply shortages. The group petitioned the Patent Office in April 1955 to revoke the trademark. It was not until April 1960, that the Patent Office handed down its decision to maintain the registered trademark. So the group filed a suit in the Tokyo High Court, which in September 1971, ruled that "The seirongan is recognized by the nation's populace as a common name for bowels-regulating agents that use creosote as main ingredient, and [the court hereby] rules to void the Patent Office's decision to make it a proprietary trademark". This ruling was upheld by the Supreme Court of Japan, thus finalizing the decision in March 1974.

However, the Seirogan registered trademark is still retained by Taiko Pharmaceutical (Trademark Registration No. 545984). It is not clear why the registered trademark remains unexpunged despite the supreme court ruling, but a trademark registration does not vanish automatically, and needs to go through a Patent Office review process. The Patent Office may have surmised that the Court's ruling effectively accomplished the purpose or remedy sought by the petitioners, obviating the need for another review. The Court's opinion made it expressly clear that the name Seirogan had passed into a common noun, which meant that the trademark privileges (proprietary rights) upon it was not protected or enforceable pursuant to Japan's Trademark Act, Article 26, Paragraph 2.

Thus companies other than Taiko are allowed to sell the drug under the "Seirogan" name, without this constituting an infringement of trademark. Taiko's attempted litigation in 2005-8 (described) also failed to establish its proprietary rights. But the Court's opinion curiously left open a leeway, allowing for possible future reversal depending on the shift in popular convention. Seirogan is one of few pharmaceutical drugs names thus given public domain status, aspirin being another immediately called to mind.

=== Taiko's petition for an injunction against unfair competitive practices ===
On November 24, 2005, Taiko Pharmaceutical filed a suit against Izumi Yakuhin Kogyou in the Osaka District Court, claiming the sales of merchandise with similar packaging constituted an act of unfair competitive practice under Unfair Competition Prevention Act (Japan) 2.1.1 or 2.1.2, and was an infringement of its trademark rights (docket number: Heisei 17 (wa）No. 11663). On July 27, 2006, The Osaka District Court ruled against the plaintiff saying a distinction can be made between the bugle and calabash logos. Taiko then appealed on August 7, but the Osaka High Court upheld the decision, and the Supreme Court's second Petty bench (Japan) rejected against hearing the case on July 4, 2008, which finalized Taiko's loss in this lawsuit.

But in the opinion read by the court contained this passage: "Whether a certain label is a common name or not is an issue pertaining to perception by users (commercial dealers and consumers at large), so even if a label has been regarded as a common name within a certain period, it may later come to be perceived as denoting a specific product as a matter of the ongoing real situation of its commerce, and it is not impossible for it to regain its source designator (出所表示機, shussho hyōji kinō) (i.e., manufacturer specifying) purpose".

== Coal tar controversy ==
The primary active ingredient used in seirogan is wood-tar creosote. This was listed merely as "creosote" in the first edition of the Japanese Pharmacopoeia (日本薬局方, Nihon yakkyokuhō), a Ministry of Health issued guidebook, and remained so for a time, until it was listed more specifically as moku-kureosōto (木クレオソート; "wood creosote") in the fifteenth revised first supplement dated 2007, making this the official name. In addition, "a long-term safety study in rats documented a lack of oncogenicity for wood creosote" The second supplement then defined the coal-derivative kureosōto-yu (クレオソート油; "creosote oil") as a separate commodity (containing carcinogenic substances such as Benzo(a)pyrene, a Polycyclic aromatic hydrocarbon). The wood-tar creosote is commonly called "Nikkyoku creosote" (i.e. Japanese pharmacopoeial creosote) as a means to distinguish from potentially harmful industrial creosote.

These recent naming conventions were prompted by a controversy set off by a consumer alert booklet, Katte wa ikenai (買ってはいけない; "Should not buy") (pub. 1999) that anthologized a series run in the magazine Shūkan kin'yōbi. The booklet accused seirogan of its dangers, based on the mistaken notion that the wood-tar creosote and the industrial creosote oil were identical commodities.

== Society and culture ==
Mess call of Old Japan Army
The bugle tune used in Taiko's commercials

The bugle tune being played in Taiko's commercials for the product is the ex-Japanese Imperial Army bugle call to announce mealtime, colloquially known as the Shokuji rappa (食事ラッパ; "Chowtime bugle"). The tune used currently by the Japan Self-Defense Forces is of a different melody.
