= Tar water =

Medieval medicine

Tar-water was a medieval medicine consisting of pine tar and water. As it was foul-tasting, it slowly dropped in popularity, but was revived in the Victorian era. It is used both as a tonic and as a substitute to get rid of "strong spirits". Both these uses were originally advocated by the philosopher George Berkeley (1685–1753), who lauded it in his tract Siris: A Chain of Philosophical Reflections and Inquiries, Concerning the Virtues of Tar Water (1744). It was regarded by medical experts to be quackery.

== History ==
The use of tar water is mentioned in the second chapter of Charles Dickens's (1812–1870) Great Expectations (1861). Young Pip and his brother-in-law, Joe, were often force fed it by Mrs. Joe, Pip's elder sister, whether they were ill or not, as a sort of cruel punishment.

The physician Cadwallader Colden (1688–1776) extolled the virtues of pine resin steeped in water. This concoction also was called "tar water".

George Berkeley suggested that tar from pine or fir be stirred for three or four minutes with an equal quantity of water and the mixture allowed to stand for 48 hours. At this time, the separated water is drawn off to be drunk, at the rate of one half-pint night and morning "on an empty stomach". Fresh water is added to the unused portion and again stirred to provide more of the preparation, until the mixture becomes too weak.

Explorer Henry Ellis (1721–1806) praises tar water as "the only powerful and prevailing medicine" against scurvy during his 1746 voyage to Hudson's Bay (although his editor, James Lind, notes that "a want of greens and herbage" was the chief cause of the outbreak).

Fleuriot the lieutenant, who suffered from consumption in second degree, is mentioned to have been advised to take tar water in aid of his battle against the ailment, by Sarrazin the general in Memoirs of Vidocq (1828) by Eugène François Vidocq (1775–1857):

"How much fatter should you be, if I put you on half-pay? Oh, you have a fine prospect at home: if you are rich, to die gradually with overnursing; if you are poor, to increase the misery of your parents, and finish your days in a hospital. I am a doctor for you: and my prescription is a bullet, and then your cure will follow; if you escape that, the knapsack will do for you, or marching and exercise will put you to rights; these are additional chances. Besides, do as I do, drink tar-water; that is worth all your jalaps, and gruels, and messe." At the same time, he stretched out his arm, he seized a large pitcher, which was near him, and filled a can, which he offered to me, and all refusal was in vain. I was compelled to swallow some of the nauseous stuff, as was also the aide-de-camp.

— Eugène François Vidocq, p. 144 Chapter XIX

In the introduction of his Journal of A Voyage to Lisbon (1749), English author Henry Fielding (1707–1754) briefly tries tar-water as a panacea for treating dropsy: "But even such a panacea one of the greatest scholars and best of men did lately apprehend he had discovered [...]. The reader, I think, will scarce need to be informed that the writer I mean is the late bishop of Cloyne, in Ireland, and the discovery that of the virtues of tar-water". By the Bishop of Cloyne, Fielding refers to the above-mentioned philosopher George Berkeley.
