= List of Colobopsis species =

This is a list of extant valid species and subspecies of the genus Colobopsis. There are 99 species in this genus.

== A ==
- Colobopsis abdita
- Colobopsis anderseni
- Colobopsis annetteae
- Colobopsis aruensis
- Colobopsis aurata
- Colobopsis aurelianus

== B ==
- Colobopsis badia
- Colobopsis brachycephala
- Colobopsis breva Fisher, 2025
- Colobopsis bryani

== C ==
- Colobopsis calva
- Colobopsis camelus
- Colobopsis cerberula
- Colobopsis ceylonica
- Colobopsis clerodendri
- Colobopsis conica
- Colobopsis conithorax
- Colobopsis corallina
- Colobopsis cotesii
- Colobopsis cristata
- Colobopsis culmicola
- Colobopsis custodula
- Colobopsis cylindrica

== D ==
- Colobopsis dentata
- Colobopsis desecta

== E ==
- Colobopsis elysii
- Colobopsis equus
- Colobopsis etiolata
- Colobopsis excavata
- Colobopsis explodens

== F ==
- Colobopsis fijiana
- Colobopsis flavolimbata

== G ==
- Colobopsis gasseri
- Colobopsis gundlachi
- Colobopsis guppyi

== H ==
- Colobopsis horrens
- Colobopsis horripilus
- Colobopsis hosei
- Colobopsis howensis
- Colobopsis hunteri

== I ==
- Colobopsis impressa
- Colobopsis imitans

== K ==
- Colobopsis kadi
- Colobopsis karawaiewi

== L ==
- Colobopsis laminata
- Colobopsis laotsei
- Colobopsis lauensis
- Colobopsis leonardi
- Colobopsis levuana
- Colobopsis loa
- Colobopsis longi

== M ==
- Colobopsis maafui
- Colobopsis macarangae
- Colobopsis macrocephala
- Colobopsis manni
- Colobopsis markli
- Colobopsis mathildeae
- Colobopsis mississippiensis
- Colobopsis mutilata

== N ==
- Colobopsis newzealandica
- Colobopsis nigrifrons
- Colobopsis nipponica

== O ==
- Colobopsis obliqua
- Colobopsis oceanica

== P ==
- Colobopsis papago
- Colobopsis perneser
- Colobopsis phragmaticola
- Colobopsis politae
- Colobopsis polynesica
- Colobopsis pylartes
- Colobopsis pylora

== Q ==
- Colobopsis quadriceps

== R ==
- Colobopsis reepeni
- Colobopsis riehlii
- Colobopsis rothneyi
- Colobopsis rotunda
- Colobopsis rufifrons

== S ==
- Colobopsis sadina
- Colobopsis saginata
- Colobopsis sanguinifrons
- Colobopsis saundersi
- Colobopsis schmeltzi
- Colobopsis schmitzi
- Colobopsis severini
- Colobopsis shohki
- Colobopsis smithiana
- Colobopsis sommeri
- Colobopsis stricta

== T ==
- Colobopsis taivanae
- Colobopsis trajanus
- Colobopsis tricolor
- Colobopsis triton
- Colobopsis truncata

== U ==
- Colobopsis umbratilis

== V ==
- Colobopsis vitiensis
- Colobopsis vitrea

== W ==
- Colobopsis wildae
