= Coraliomargarita akajimensis =

Scientific classification
- Domain: Bacteria
- Kingdom: Pseudomonadati
- Phylum: Verrucomicrobiota
- Class: Opitutia
- Order: Puniceicoccales
- Family: Coraliomargaritaceae
- Genus: Coraliomargarita
- Species: C. akajimensis

Binomial name
- Coraliomargarita akajimensis Yoon et al., 2007

Species of bacterium

Coraliomargarita akajimensis is a Gram-negative, coccoid bacterium in the phylum Verrucomicrobiota, first isolated from seawater near Akajima Island, Japan. It is a species of the genus Coraliomargarita and an obligate aerobic heterotroph adapted to marine environments.

== Discovery ==
Coraliomargarita akajimensis was first discovered in 2007 by Yoon and colleagues during research examining bacterial diversity in marine environments. The organism was isolated from seawater samples collected in March 2004 surrounding the hard coral Galaxea fascicularis at Majanohama, Akajima Island in Okinawa, Japan, an area known for rich coral reef ecosystems with diverse microbial communities. The isolation was performed using standard dilution plating techniques on marine agar. The isolated bacterium was then characterized using phase-contrast and scanning electron microscopy, biochemical profiling (including API 20NE and API ZYM test systems), and 16S rRNA gene sequencing, which together showed that it did not match any previously documented species. These analyses placed it within a distinct lineage of the phylum Verrucomicrobiota, a diverse group commonly found in aquatic environments, and more specifically within the class Opitutia.

Based on 16S rRNA gene sequence analysis, Coraliomargarita akajimensis shares the highest sequence similarity with two formally named members of the class Opitutia: Puniceicoccus vermicola (88.3% similarity), isolated from the digestive tract of a marine clamworm, and Pelagicoccus croceus (87.6% similarity), isolated from seagrass. Remaining members of the class share only 84.1 – 87.2% similarity with Coraliomargarita akajimensis. These relatively low similarity values, which are considerably smaller than the ~97% threshold typically used to delineate bacterial species, indicate that Coraliomargarita akajimensis occupies a phylogenetically distinct and isolated position within the class Opitutia. Lentimonas marisflavi, an unpublished species credited to Choo & Cho (2006), and Fucophilus fucoidanolyticus, isolated from the gut of the sea cucumber Stichopus japonicus, are both closer cultivable relatives with higher (approximately 94%) 16S rRNA gene similarity with Coraliomargarita akajimensis, but neither name has been validly published under the rules of bacterial nomenclature as of the time the genome paper was written.

== Etymology ==
The genus name Coraliomargarita is derived from the Latin words coralium (“coral”) and margarita (“pearl”). This organism’s name refers to its association with coral reef environments as well as its spherical, pearl-like cell shape. The species epithet akajimensis denotes the bacterium’s place of origin, Akajima Island in Okinawa, Japan.

== Morphology ==
Coraliomargarita akajimensis are non-motile, non-spore-forming, Gram-negative bacteria that possess an outer membrane typical of many bacterial groups. The cell wall hydrolysate's amino acid contents were analyzed to reveal the absence of muramic acid and diaminopimelic acid, which typically form the structural backbone of peptidoglycan. The lack of these two molecules indicates that Coraliomargarita akajimensis lacks a conventional peptidoglycan cell wall, which is an unusual characteristic among Gram-negative bacteria. Scanning electron microscopy reveals coccoid, or spherical, cells approximately 1.2 μm in diameter that occur individually rather than forming chains or clusters. On marine agar, colonies of Coraliomargarita akajimensis appear circular, convex, and white.

== Physiology ==
The organism is an obligate aerobic heterotroph, requiring oxygen and obtaining energy through the consumption of external organic carbon compounds. Laboratory growth experiments established that Coraliomargarita akajimensis grows optimally in conditions consistent with the shallow tropical seawater from which it was isolated: at temperatures between 20–30°C (optimum 25°C), at a pH range of 7–9 (optimum pH 8.0), and with NaCl concentrations of 0.1–5% (optimum 2.5%). No growth is observed at 4°C or below, or at 45°C or above. The organism grows aerobically on marine agar and on half-strength R2A agar supplemented with 75% artificial seawater. Biochemical tests revealed that a range of carbohydrates and organic molecules can be metabolized as carbon sources, including glucose, fructose, galactose, arabinose, cellobiose, gluconate, glycogen, and fucose, among others.

== Genomics ==
The complete genome of Coraliomargarita akajimensis was sequenced as part of the Genomic Encyclopedia of Bacteria and Archaea (GEBA) project, a systematic initiative to fill phylogenetic gaps in the microbial tree of life with reference-quality genome sequences. This was the first complete genome sequence reported for any member of the family Coraliomargaritaceae. The genome is 3,750,771 base pairs in length and encodes 3,137 protein-coding genes and 55 RNA genes, with a DNA G+C content of 53.9 mol%.. Clusters of Orthologous Groups (COG) analysis revealed genes in categories corresponding to carbohydrate transport and metabolism (COG category G), inorganic ion transport and metabolism (COG category P), and signal transduction mechanisms (COG category T), suggesting that the bacterium is adapted to variable nutrient conditions in aquatic environments. Notably, the genome encodes 49 sulfatases, 12 α-L-fucosidases (glycoside hydrolase family 29), and 12 β-agarases, indicating potential capacity for degrading sulfated marine polysaccharides such as fucoidan. Interestingly, while laboratory tests of the original isolate did not detect hydrolysis of agar, the genome encodes 12 predicted β-agarases, suggesting latent or condition-dependent enzymatic capacity that has not yet been observed under standard culture conditions. This collection of enzymes is characteristic of marine Verrucomicrobiota. Related members of the phylum, particularly those within the family Puniceicoccaceae of the same order Puniceicoccales, have been experimentally shown to specialize in the degradation of fucosylated and sulfated polysaccharides during phytoplankton blooms. Comparative genomic analysis confirmed the organism’s classification within Verrucomicrobiota and highlighted genetic characteristics shared with other members of the class Opitutia. The genome also encodes predicted nitrate reductase and nitrite reductase genes, suggesting a potential role in nitrogen cycling that has not yet been experimentally verified.

== Ecology ==
Members of the phylum Verrucomicrobiota are among the most frequently detected bacteria in environmental DNA sequencing surveys of marine ecosystems. In a global survey of 506 samples including both water column and sediment communities, Verrucomicrobia were present in 98% of samples and constituted on average approximately 2% of water column bacterial communities, indicating that this phylum is extremely widespread in the ocean. These surveys suggest that Verrucomicrobia play a role in decomposing organic matter and facilitating nutrient cycling in the ocean, and their prevalence implies importance for the marine carbon cycle as well. More recent work has confirmed that marine Verrucomicrobiota, specifically members of the family Puniceicoccaceae, are specialized degraders of polysaccharides that are typically hard to break down. During spring phytoplankton blooms in the North Sea, Verrucomicrobiota accounted for up to 8% of the bacterioplankton and actively expressed glycoside hydrolase and sulfatase pathways for the degradation of fucosylated algal polysaccharides. Although the specific ecological role of Coraliomargarita akajimensis itself has not been studied in the environment, its affiliation with Puniceicoccaceae and the presence of certain enzymes encoded in its genome suggest it may participate in similar polysaccharide degradation within coral reef microbial communities.

== Importance ==
Marine microorganisms are primary drivers of global biogeochemical cycles, as they facilitate the movement of carbon and nitrogen through ocean food webs. Verrucomicrobiota in particular contribute to these cycles by degrading some of the most structurally complex organic matter in the sea, including sulfated polysaccharides produced by algae and diatoms, releasing nutrients that support marine primary production.

The genome of Coraliomargarita akajimensis is of practical scientific interest due to its large collection of sulfatases and glycoside hydrolases that are thought to degrade fucoidan, a sulfated polysaccharide abundant in the cell walls of brown algae. Fucoidan has attracted significant biomedical attention for its anti-inflammatory, anticoagulant, antiviral, and potential anti-cancer properties, but producing fucoidan-derived compounds for pharmaceutical or nutraceutical use requires specialized enzymes capable of precisely breaking down its complex backbone. With 49 sulfatases and 12 α-L-fucosidases encoded in its genome, Coraliomargarita akajimensis is a candidate source for discovering such biocatalysts. Its closest relative with a published name, 'Lentimonas' sp., already possesses one of the most elaborate fucoidan-degradation enzyme systems known, using over 100 specialized enzymes to break down a single fucoidan variant. This suggests that Coraliomargarita akajimensis may hold similar potential for the discovery of novel fucoidan-degrading enzymes.

The discovery and genome sequencing of Coraliomargarita akajimensis also helped fill a gap in knowledge of Verrucomicrobiota, a phylum that is historically underrepresented in genomic databases despite being widespread in the ocean. As the first complete genome from the family Coraliomargaritaceae, it serves as a reference point for future genomic and ecological studies. Its continued characterization also advances both our understanding of marine microbial diversity and the search for novel enzymes with applications in medicine and biotechnology.
