= Cephaloticoccus capnophilus =

Scientific classification
- Domain: Bacteria
- Kingdom: Pseudomonadati
- Phylum: Verrucomicrobiota
- Class: Opitutae
- Order: Opitutales
- Family: Opitutaceae
- Genus: Cephaloticoccus
- Species: C. capnophilus

Binomial name
- Cephaloticoccus capnophilus Lin et al. 2016

Type strain
- ATCC TSD-39, DSM 100879, NCIMB 15005, CV41

Species of bacterium

Cephaloticoccus capnophilus is a Gram-negative and non-motile bacterium from the genus of Cephaloticoccus which has been isolated from the gut of the ant Cephalotes varians from the Crocodile Lake National Wildlife Refuge in Florida in the United States.
