= Alterococcus =

Scientific classification
- Domain: Bacteria
- Kingdom: Pseudomonadati
- Phylum: Verrucomicrobiota
- Class: Opitutae
- Order: Opitutales
- Family: Opitutaceae
- Genus: Alterococcus; Shieh & Jean 1999

Type species
- Alterococcus agarolyticus Shieh & Jean 1999

Species
- A. agarolyticus

Genus of bacteria

Alterococcus is a genus of bacteria from the family of Opitutaceae with one species Alterococcus agarolyticus.

== See also ==
- List of bacterial orders
- List of bacteria genera
