= Opitutus terrae =

Scientific classification
- Domain: Bacteria
- Kingdom: Pseudomonadati
- Phylum: Verrucomicrobiota
- Class: Opitutae
- Order: Opitutales
- Family: Opitutaceae
- Genus: Opitutus
- Species: O. terrae

Binomial name
- Opitutus terrae Chin et al. 2001

Species of bacterium

Opitutus terrae is an obligately anaerobic (cannot grow in the presence of oxygen) bacterium first isolated from rice paddy soil, hence its epithet. It is coccus-shaped and is motile by means of a flagellum. Its type strain is PB90-1^{T} (= DSM 11246^{T}). Its genome has been sequenced.
