= Lacunisphaera parvula =

Scientific classification
- Domain: Bacteria
- Kingdom: Pseudomonadati
- Phylum: Verrucomicrobiota
- Class: Opitutae
- Order: Opitutales
- Family: Opitutaceae
- Genus: Lacunisphaera
- Species: L. parvula

Binomial name
- Lacunisphaera parvula Rast et al. 2017

Type strain
- IG15

Species of bacterium

Lacunisphaera parvula is a Gram-negative and aerobic bacterium from the genus of Lacunisphaera which has been isolated from a freshwater lake.
