= Alterococcus agarolyticus =

Scientific classification
- Domain: Bacteria
- Kingdom: Pseudomonadati
- Phylum: Verrucomicrobiota
- Class: Opitutae
- Order: Opitutales
- Family: Opitutaceae
- Genus: Alterococcus
- Species: A. agarolyticus

Binomial name
- Alterococcus agarolyticus Shieh and Jean 1999

Type strain
- ADT3

Species of bacterium

Alterococcus agarolyticus is a Gram-negative, facultatively anaerobic, halophilic and thermophilic bacterium from the genus of Alterococcus.
