= Phragmosis =

Animal method of defense

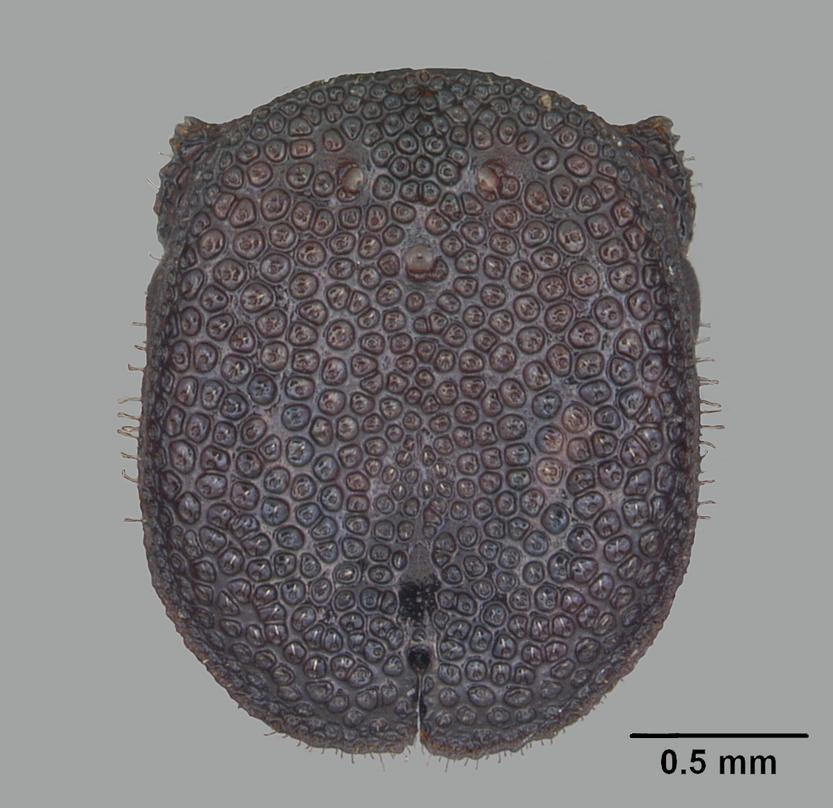
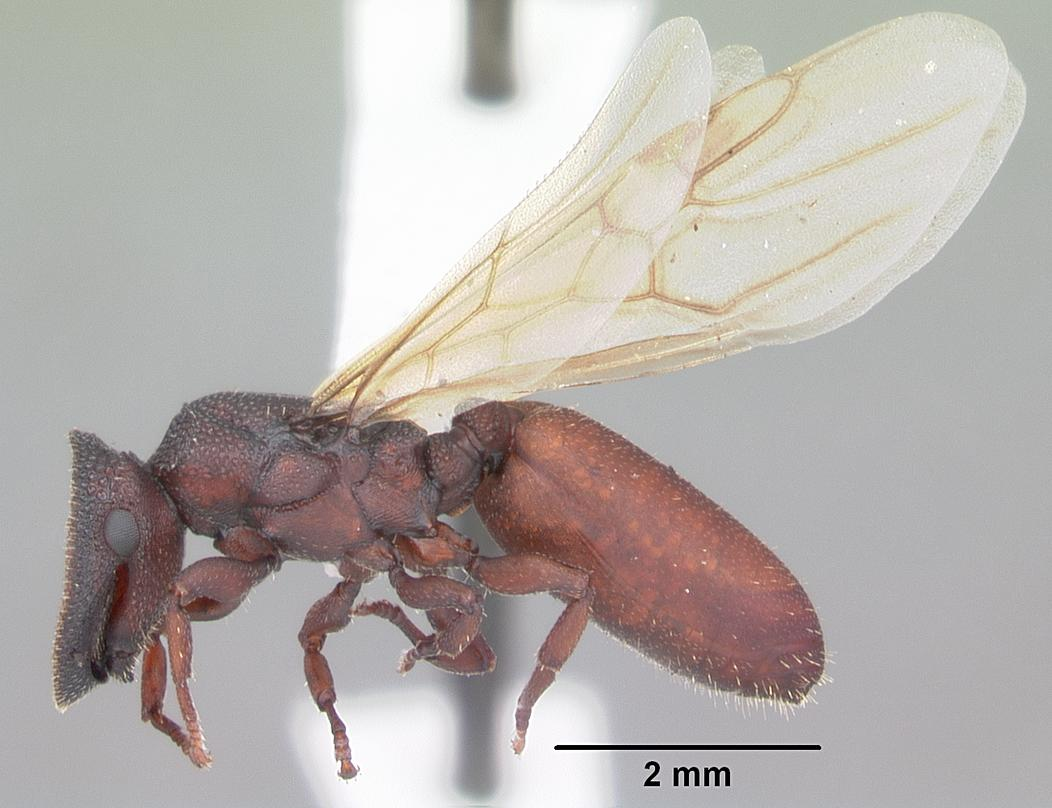
The phragmotic head of Cephalotes varians.

Phragmosis is any method by which an animal defends itself in its burrow, by using its own body as a barrier. This term was originally coined by W. M. Wheeler (1927), while describing the defensive technique exhibited by insects. Wheeler observed the positioning of specially modified body structures to block nest entrances, as exhibited in various insect species. The term phragmosis has since been further extended beyond just insects.

Examples of phragmosis are found in the order Anura (frogs and toads). Some species, such as Pternohyla fodiens and Corythomantis greeningi, have evolved a peculiarly casqued head adapted to protect the animal as it backs down a hole. Another example is the head-plug defense used by the aphid Astegopteryx sp., in which a banana-bunch shaped gall consisting of several subgalls is used as a barrier. Arguably, the most commonly observed phragmotic behaviour is within the ant family. The behaviour is displayed in numerous taxa such as Camponotus, Colobostruma, Crematogaster, Pheidole, Blepharidatta, Cephalotes pusillus, Carebara elmenteitae, Stenamma expolitum, in which the soldiers have unusually large, disc-shaped heads, which are used to block nest entrances against intruders.

== In Anura ==
=== Corythomantis greeningi ===
Anurans involve a diverse group of largely carnivorous, short-bodied, tailless amphibians. Within this group, some frogs are characterized by a peculiar casqued head, with the skin co-ossified with the underlying bones. This type of skull is generally associated with phragmotic behaviour, where the animal will enter a hole and block the entrance with its head.

Recent studies of Corythomantis greeningi, a casque-headed tree frog from semi-arid areas, have provided substantial information regarding the water economy associated with co-ossification of the head. Due to the arid environments of most casque-headed anurans, it has been proposed that head co-ossification, together with phragmotic behaviour confer protection against water loss. Upon further investigation, it has been found that cranial co-ossification contributes little to conservation of water, but instead has a primary role of defence. This type of skull morphology primarily acts to protect the animal against predators, and in doing so, leads to an indirect enhancement of water balance within the body.

In the study conducted by Jared et al. (1999) and Navas, Jared & Antoniazzi (2002), C. greeningi demonstrated the ability to enter test tubes backwards and close the entrance with their heads, a behaviour termed 'experimental phragmosis'. The study found that while phragmotic behaviour does not provide a significant reduction in water evaporation, it is important for preventing desiccation. It was concluded that in C. greeningi, the co-ossified head likely evolved originally as a protective lid for phragmotic individuals, but does aid in reducing water permeability through the head.

=== Pternohyla fodiens ===
The Mexican hylid casque-headed frog, Pternohyla fodiens, utilizes the head casque to close the entrance of its refuge in a tree cavity by deflecting the head. Due to their frequent foraging on the ground, this species often makes use of vertical burrows already extant in the ground layer as well. Upon arrival of intruder, P. fodiens assumes an immobile position – the head tipped back, with the entire body assumed in a gentle arch. The eyes close tightly, fore-legs are brought forward and upward, and hind-legs are flexed upward. By exhibiting the phragmotic habit during this interaction, it is more likely to effectively avoid predation.

== In gall-forming aphids ==
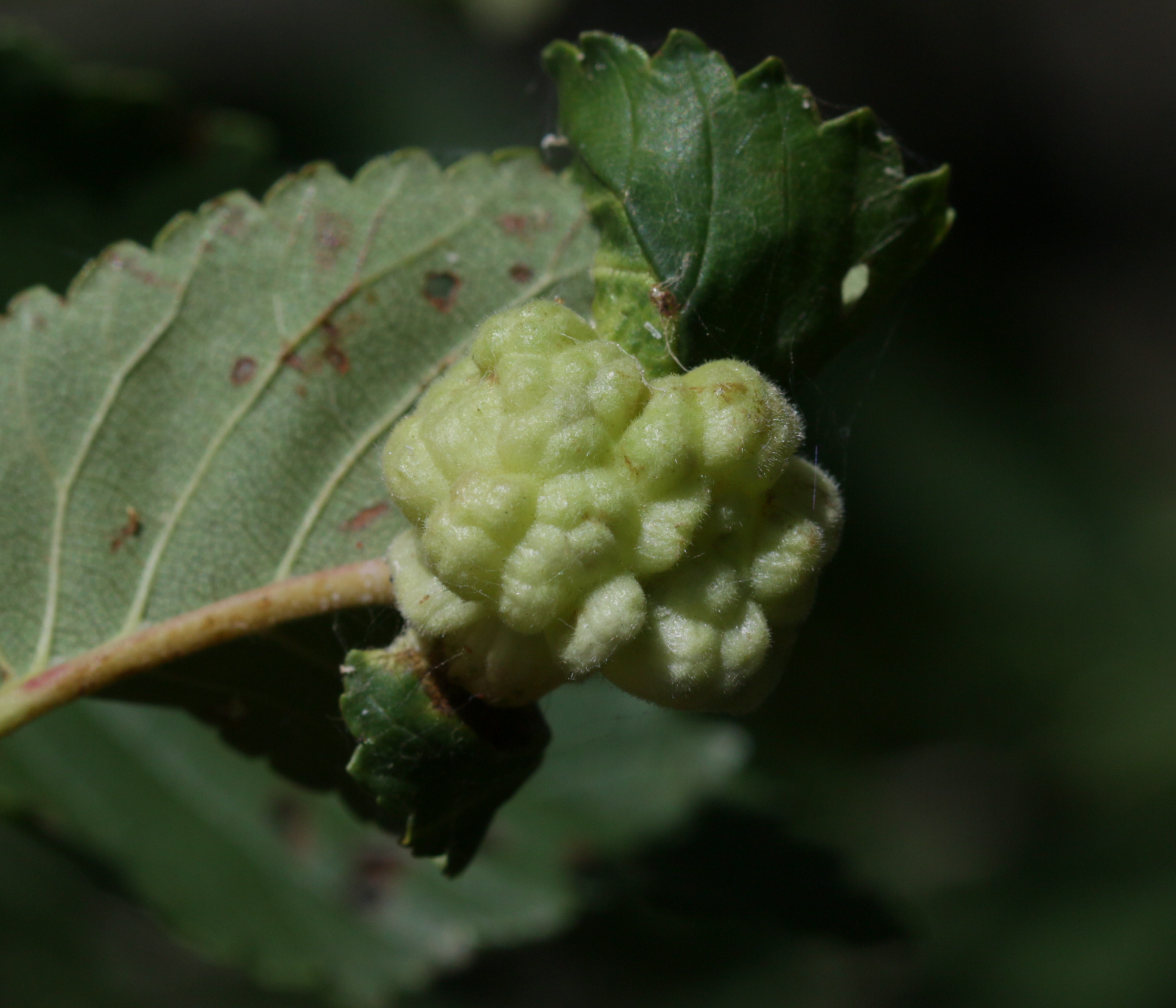
Aphid gall on Ulmus minor

The aphid Astegopteryx sp. exhibits a head-plugging defense by forming a banana-bunch shaped gall, consisting of several subgalls, on Styrax benzoin. The soldier aphids of Astegopteryx are characterized by their sclerotic, protruded heads, covered in many spine-like setae. Several soldiers cooperate with one another to plug the ostiole of the subgall, utilizing their specialized morphology.

In a study by Kurosu et al. (2005), of 173 ostioles examined, 90.8% were plugged, with no space among the guarding soldiers. Of the 90.8% plugged ostioles, several male intruders were found outside the phragmotic plug, attempting to enter. All intruders were blocked by the guarding soldiers, and it was nearly impossible to enter the subgall.

Astegopteryx soldiers effectively defend their subgall by plugging the ostiole nearly completely with their sclerotic, spiny heads, which are very likely to have evolved for that purpose.

== In ants ==
Phragmotic-headed ants prevent intruders from entering nests by blocking the entrances, or by pushing them out of entrance galleries. Within the Neotropical species, Blepharidatta conops, queens are characterized by shield-like heads, and appear to secrete fibrous material. The material acts as a coating and eventually accumulates into a dense tangle of material, creating a disk over the head. When nests are visited, or inhabited by predators (especially beetles), the entrance is quickly blocked by the peculiar phragmotic disk of the queen. This modification of the body enables the queen to act as a living gate to the brood chamber.

Phragmosis in ants has evolved independently in the diverse ant genera Camponotus Mayr (Hypercolobopsis), Colobopsis Mayr, Cephalotes Latreille, Colobostruma Wheeler (C. leae), Crematogaster Lund (Colobocrema), Pheidole Westwood (P. colobopsis, P. lamia), but also in other genera, such as Blepharidatta Smith, (B. conops), Tetraponera Smith (T. phrag- motica) and Carebara Westwood. The behaviour is most developed in the genus Cephalotes, where all castes (both queens and workers), have highly adapted head morphologies. The shield-like armor which characterizes this behaviour enables plugging of nest entrances, without exposing eyes, antenna or mandibles to any potential intruders.

== In spiders ==
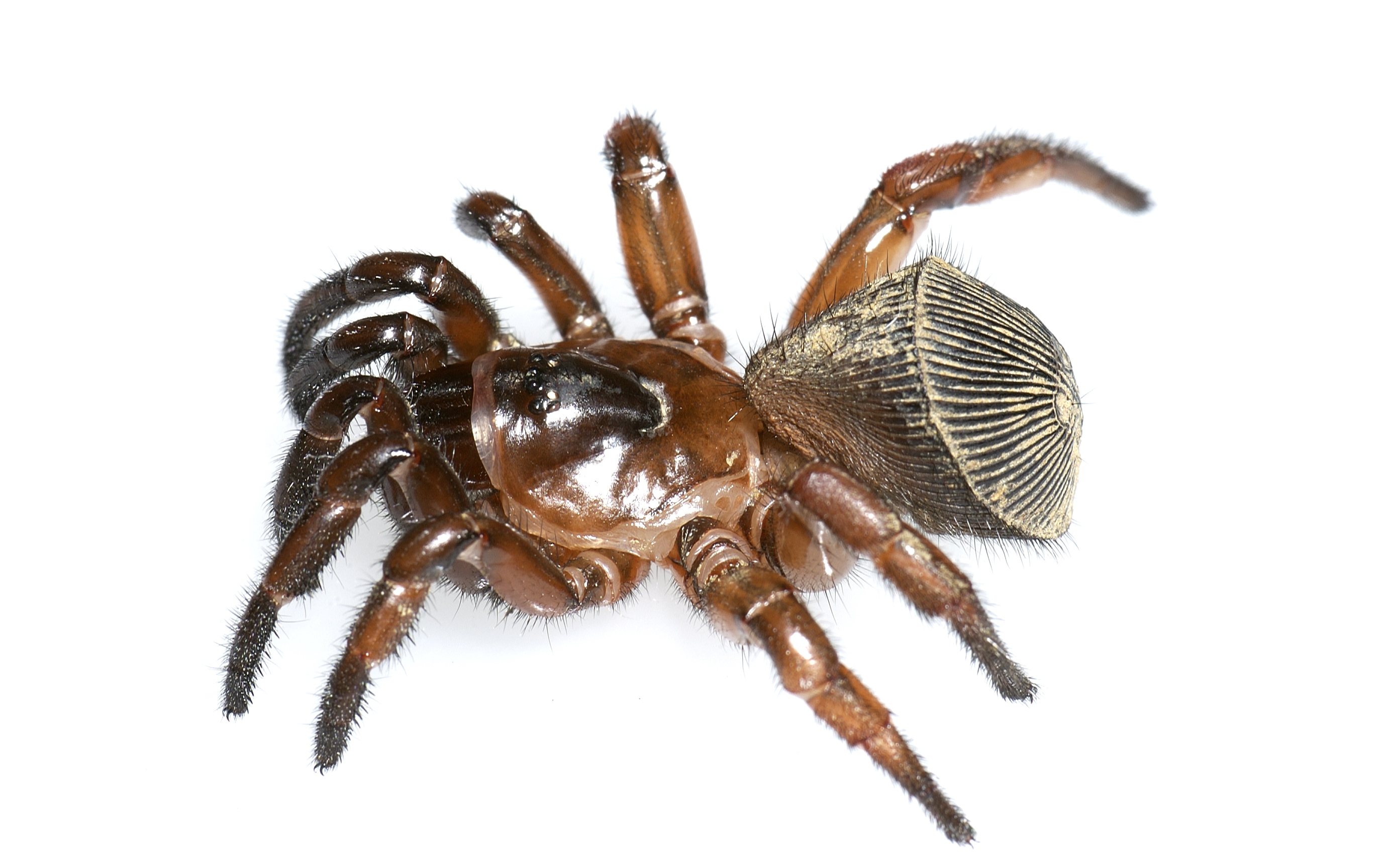
Cyclocosmia truncata

The trapdoor spider Cyclocosmia has an abdomen ending in a hardened disc that it uses to plug the entrance to its burrow.
