= Oleiharenicola lentus =

Scientific classification
- Domain: Bacteria
- Kingdom: Pseudomonadati
- Phylum: Verrucomicrobiota
- Class: Opitutae
- Order: Opitutales
- Family: Opitutaceae
- Genus: Oleiharenicola
- Species: O. lentus

Binomial name
- Oleiharenicola lentus Chen et al. 2020

Type strain
- TWA-58

Species of bacterium

Oleiharenicola lentus is a Gram-negative, aerobic and motile bacterium from the genus of Oleiharenicola which has been isolated from irrigation water from Taiwan.
