= Oleiharenicola alkalitolerans =

Scientific classification
- Domain: Bacteria
- Kingdom: Pseudomonadati
- Phylum: Verrucomicrobiota
- Class: Opitutae
- Order: Opitutales
- Family: Opitutaceae
- Genus: Oleiharenicola
- Species: O. alkalitolerans

Binomial name
- Oleiharenicola alkalitolerans Rochman et al. 2018

Type strain
- NVT

Species of bacterium

Oleiharenicola alkalitolerans is a Gram-negative, strictly aerobic, neutrophilic and non-motile bacterium from the genus of Oleiharenicola which has been isolated from an oil sand tailings pond in Canada.
