= Oleiharenicola =

Scientific classification
- Domain: Bacteria
- Kingdom: Pseudomonadati
- Phylum: Verrucomicrobiota
- Class: Opitutae
- Order: Opitutales
- Family: Opitutaceae
- Genus: Oleiharenicola; Rochman et al. 2018

Type species
- Oleiharenicola alkalitolerans Rochman et al. 2018

Species
- O. alkalitolerans; O. lentus

Genus of bacteria

Oleiharenicola is a genus of bacteria from the family of Opitutaceae.

== See also ==
- List of bacterial orders
- List of bacteria genera
