= Cephaloticoccus =

Scientific classification
- Domain: Bacteria
- Kingdom: Pseudomonadati
- Phylum: Verrucomicrobiota
- Class: Opitutae
- Order: Opitutales
- Family: Opitutaceae
- Genus: Cephaloticoccus; Lin et al. 2016

Type species
- Cephaloticoccus primus Lin et al. 2016

Species
- C. capnophilus; C. primus

Genus of bacteria

Cephaloticoccus is a Gram-negative and non-motile genus of bacteria from the family of Opitutaceae which occur in the guts of Cephalotes ants.

== See also ==
- List of bacterial orders
- List of bacteria genera
