= Opitutus =

Scientific classification
- Domain: Bacteria
- Kingdom: Pseudomonadati
- Phylum: Verrucomicrobiota
- Class: Opitutae
- Order: Opitutales
- Family: Opitutaceae
- Genus: Opitutus; Chin, Liesack & Janssen 2001

Type species
- Opitutus terrae Chin, Liesack & Janssen 2001

Species
- O. terrae

Genus of bacteria

Opitutus is a genus of bacteria from the family of Opitutaceae with one known species (Opitutus terrae).

== See also ==
- List of bacterial orders
- List of bacteria genera
