= Rariglobus =

Scientific classification
- Domain: Bacteria
- Kingdom: Pseudomonadati
- Phylum: Verrucomicrobiota
- Class: Opitutae
- Order: Opitutales
- Family: Opitutaceae
- Genus: Rariglobus; Pitt et al. 2020

Type species
- Rariglobus hedericola Pitt et al. 2020

Species
- R. hedericola

Genus of bacteria

Rariglobus is a genus of bacteria from the family of Opitutaceae with one known species Rariglobus hedericola. Rariglobus hederico has been isolated from a freshwater ditch in Eugendorf.

== See also ==
- List of bacterial orders
- List of bacteria genera
