= Coraliomargarita sinensis =

Scientific classification
- Domain: Bacteria
- Kingdom: Pseudomonadati
- Phylum: Verrucomicrobiota
- Class: Opitutae
- Order: Puniceicoccales
- Family: Puniceicoccaceae
- Genus: Coraliomargarita
- Species: C. sinensis

Binomial name
- Coraliomargarita sinensis Zhou et al. 2019

Type strain
- WN38

Species of bacterium

Coraliomargarita sinensis is a Gram-negative and obligately aerobic bacterium from the genus of Coraliomargarita which has been isolated from a marine solar saltern from the coast of Weihai.
