= Lacunisphaera =

Scientific classification
- Domain: Bacteria
- Kingdom: Pseudomonadati
- Phylum: Verrucomicrobiota
- Class: Opitutae
- Order: Opitutales
- Family: Opitutaceae
- Genus: Lacunisphaera; Rast et al. 2025

Type species
- Lacunisphaera limnophila Rast et al. 2025

Species
- "L. anatis"; L. limnophila; L. parvula

Genus of bacteria

Lacunisphaera is a Gram-negative, aerobic and motile genus of bacteria from the family Opitutaceae.
