= Coraliomargarita =

Scientific classification
- Domain: Bacteria
- Kingdom: Pseudomonadati
- Phylum: Verrucomicrobiota
- Class: Opitutia
- Order: Puniceicoccales
- Family: Coraliomargaritaceae
- Genus: Coraliomargarita; Yoon et al. 2007

Type species
- Coraliomargarita akajimensis Yoon et al. 2007

Species
- Coraliomargarita akajimensis; Coraliomargarita algicola; Coraliomargarita parva; Coraliomargarita sinensis

Species of bacterium

Coraliomargarita is a Gram-negative, obligately aerobic and non-motile bacterial genus from the family of Puniceicoccaceae.

== Phylogeny ==
The currently accepted taxonomy is based on the List of Prokaryotic names with Standing in Nomenclature (LPSN) and National Center for Biotechnology Information (NCBI).

16S rRNA based LTP_10_2024

- Coraliomargarita
  - C. akajimensis
  - - C. parva
    - C. sinensis

120 marker proteins based GTDB 10-RS226

- - Coraliomargarita akajimensis Yoon et al. 2007 (type sp.)
  - - Coraliomargarita parva Min et al. 2023
    - - Coraliomargarita sinensis Zhou et al. 2019
      - "Lentimonas marisflavi" Choo & Cho 2006
