= Nibricoccus =

Scientific classification
- Domain: Bacteria
- Kingdom: Pseudomonadati
- Phylum: Verrucomicrobiota
- Class: Opitutae
- Order: Opitutales
- Family: Opitutaceae
- Genus: Nibricoccus; Baek et al. 2019

Type species
- Nibricoccus aquaticus Baek et al. 2019

Species
- N. aquaticus

Genus of bacteria

Nibricoccus is a Gram-negative, strictly aerobic and non-motile genus of bacteria from the family of Opitutaceae with one known species (Nibricoccus aquaticus). Nibricoccus aquaticus has been isolated from hyporheic freshwater from Korea.

== See also ==
- List of bacterial orders
- List of bacteria genera
