= Pelagicoccus mobilis =

Scientific classification
- Domain: Bacteria
- Kingdom: Pseudomonadati
- Phylum: Verrucomicrobiota
- Class: Opitutae
- Order: Puniceicoccales
- Family: Puniceicoccaceae
- Genus: Pelagicoccus
- Species: P. mobilis

Binomial name
- Pelagicoccus mobilis Yoon et al. 2007

Type strain
- 02PA-Ca-133

Species of bacterium

Pelagicoccus mobilis is a Gram-negative and chemoheterotrophic bacterium from the genus Pelagicoccus which has been isolated from seawater from Japan.
