= Geminisphaera =

Scientific classification
- Domain: Bacteria
- Kingdom: Pseudomonadati
- Phylum: Verrucomicrobiota
- Class: Opitutae
- Order: Opitutales
- Family: Opitutaceae
- Genus: Geminisphaera; Wertz et al. 2018

Type species
- Geminisphaera colitermitum Wertz et al. 2018

Species
- G. colitermitum

Synonyms
- "Didymococcus" Wertz et al. 2017 non Blume 1849; "Diplosphaera" Wertz et al. 2012 non Bialosuknia 1909 non Haeckel 1860 non Derville 1931

Genus of bacteria

Geminisphaera is a genus of bacteria from the family of Opitutaceae with one known species Geminisphaera colitermitum.

== See also ==
- List of bacterial orders
- List of bacteria genera
