= Ereboglobus =

Scientific classification
- Domain: Bacteria
- Kingdom: Pseudomonadati
- Phylum: Verrucomicrobiota
- Class: Opitutae
- Order: Opitutales
- Family: Opitutaceae
- Genus: Ereboglobus; Tegtmeier et al. 2018

Type species
- Ereboglobus luteus Tegtmeier et al. 2018

Species
- E. luteus

Genus of bacteria

Ereboglobus is a genus of bacteria from the family of Opitutaceae with one known species Ereboglobus luteus. Ereboglobus luteus has been isolated from guts of cockroach species.

== See also ==
- List of bacterial orders
- List of bacteria genera
