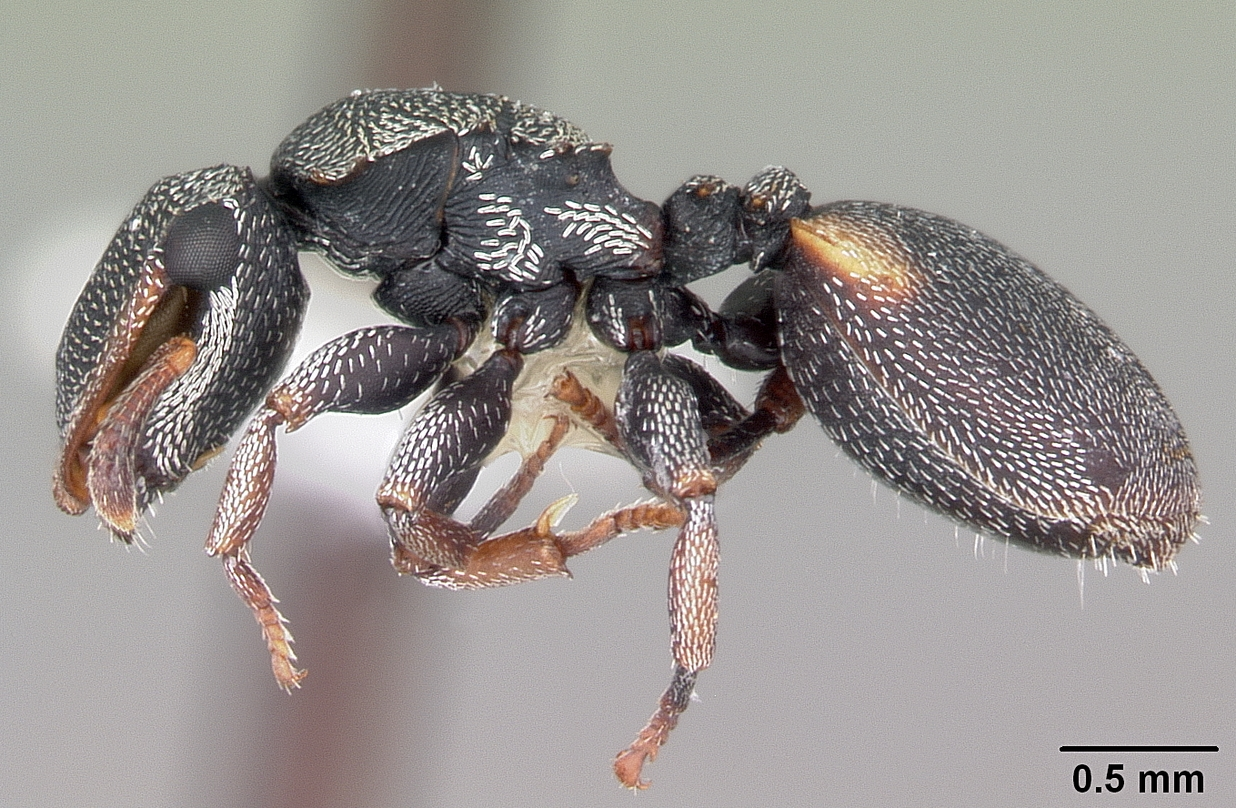
- Cephalotes texanus worker

Scientific classification
- Domain: Eukaryota
- Kingdom: Animalia
- Phylum: Arthropoda
- Class: Insecta
- Order: Hymenoptera
- Family: Formicidae
- Subfamily: Myrmicinae
- Genus: Cephalotes
- Species: C. texanus

Binomial name
- Cephalotes texanus (Santschi, 1915)

= Cephalotes texanus =

Species of ant

Cephalotes texanus is a species of arboreal ant of the genus Cephalotes, characterized by an odd shaped head, and the ability to "parachute" by steering their fall if they drop off of the tree they're on. Giving their name also as gliding ants. The species is native of Texas and of the Mexican states of Nuevo Leon, San Luis Potosí and Tamaulipas. Their larger and flatter legs, a trait common with other members of the genus Cephalotes, gives them their gliding abilities.

The species was first given a description and a classification in 1919 by Swiss entomologist Felix Santschi.

== Morphology ==
As some other members of its genus, Cephalotes texanus possesses an odd shaped head, which is the result of it adapting to nest in the nests of longhorn beetle larvae, as their nests are already dug out by them, the species does not build nests. The odd shaped head of the species allows its soldier to deny access to the nest by blocking it with their head, further blocking themselves with a dorsal ridge on the dorsal part of their thorax. They have further evolved towards this purpose with their fragile antennas being placed on the side of their heads, protected by the shield.

This form of morphological adaptation is called phragmosis.
