= Verrucomicrobia =

Verrucomicrobia may refer to:

- a deprecated taxonomic synonym of Verrucomicrobiota, a phylum of Gram-negative bacteria
- a misspelling of Verrucomicrobiia, a class of Verrucomicrobiota
