= Cerasicoccus frondis =

Scientific classification
- Domain: Bacteria
- Kingdom: Pseudomonadati
- Phylum: Verrucomicrobiota
- Class: Opitutia
- Order: Puniceicoccales
- Family: Cerasicoccaceae
- Genus: Cerasicoccus
- Species: C. frondis

Binomial name
- Cerasicoccus frondis Yoon et al. 2010

Type strain
- YM31-066

Species of bacterium

Cerasicoccus frondis is a Gram-negative, chemoheterotrophic bacterium from the genus Cerasicoccus which has been isolated from seawater.
