= Dominance (ecology) =

Measure of species' ecological influence

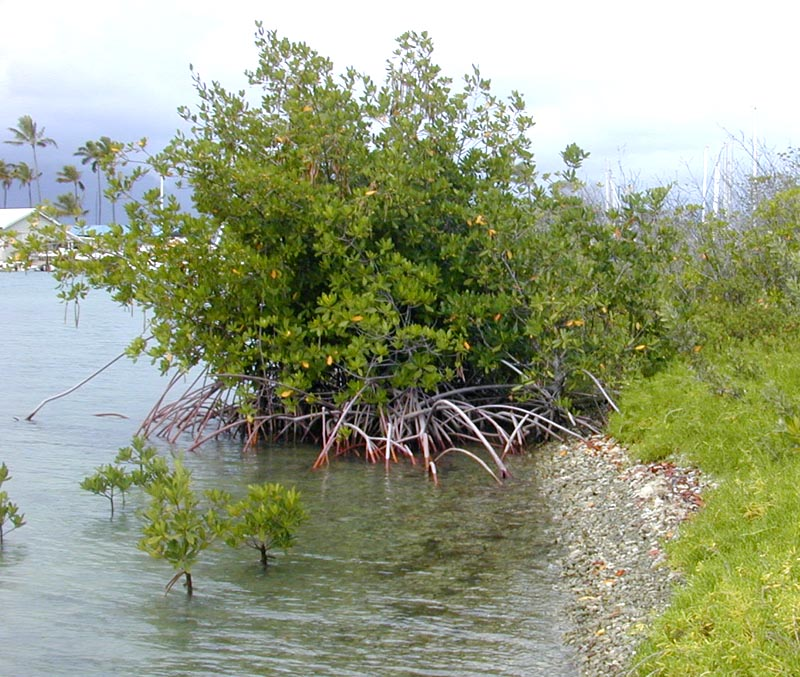
Rhizophoraceae (mangroves) dominate tropical tidal swamps

Ecological dominance is the degree to which one or several species have a major influence controlling the other species in their ecological community (because of their large size, population, productivity, or related factors) or make up more of the biomass. Both the composition and abundance of species within an ecosystem can be affected by the dominant species present.

In most of the world's ecosystems, biologists have repeatedly observed a rank-abundance curve in which ecosystems comprise a handful of incredibly abundant species, but more numerous, rarer species that are few in number. Danish botanist Christen C. Raunkiær described this phenomenon as his "law of frequency" in 1918, in which he recognized that in communities with a single species accounting for most of the biomass, species diversity was often lower.

Understandably, biologists expect to see more profound effects from those species greater in number. First formalized as the mass ratio hypothesis in a 1998 paper by English ecologist J. Philip Grime, ecologically dominant species are predicted to have overwhelming effects on ecosystem function and ecological processes due to their relatively high biomass and ubiquity.

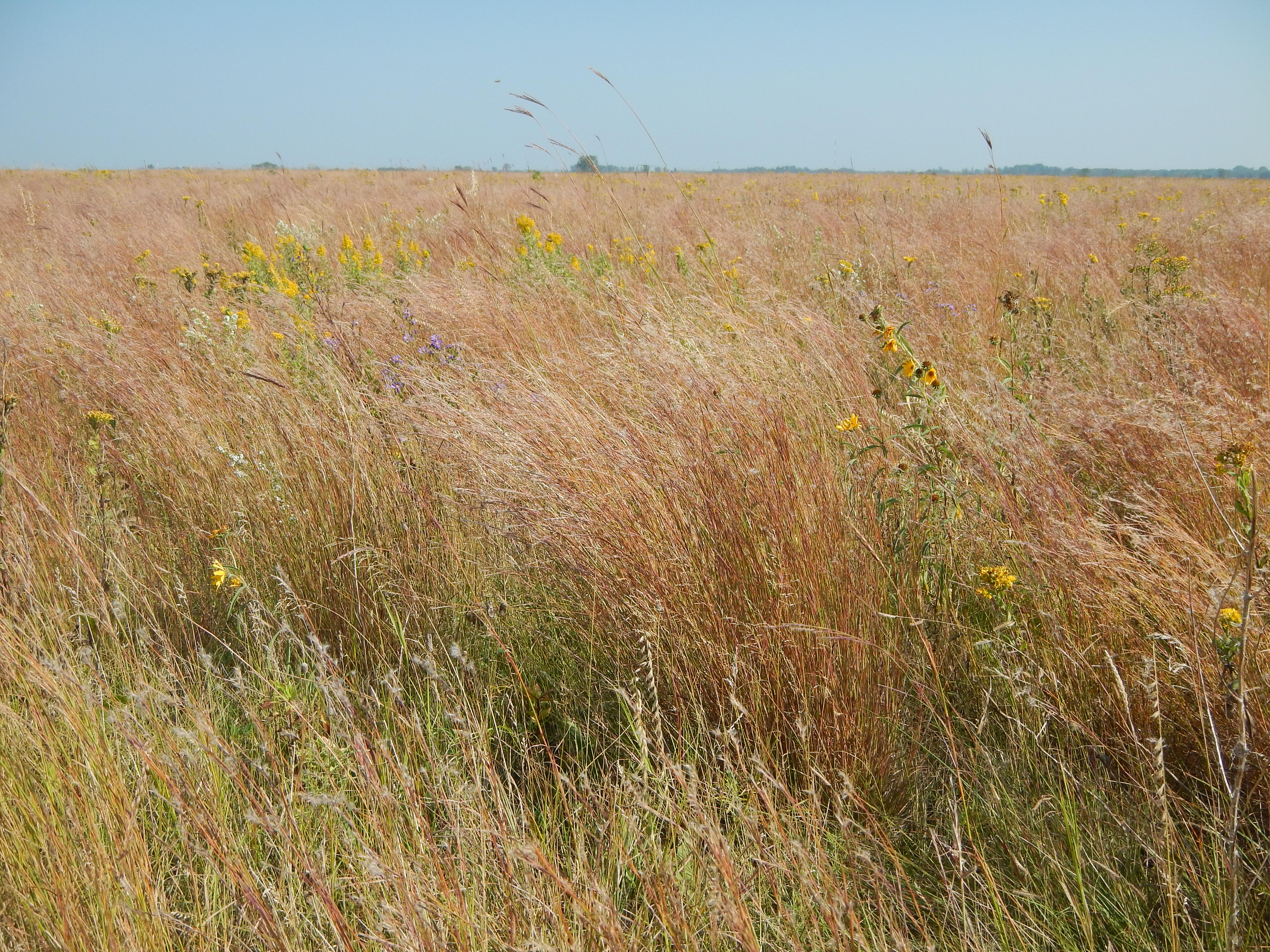
Androgopon scoparium and Andropogon gerardii dominate this tallgrass prairie in Delorme, Minnesota

Most ecological communities are defined by their dominant species.

- In many examples of wet woodland in western Europe, the dominant tree is alder (Alnus glutinosa).
- In tallgrass prairies of Northeastern Kansas, the dominant grass is (Andropogon gerardii).
- In temperate bogs, the dominant vegetation is usually species of Sphagnum moss.
- Tidal swamps in the tropics are usually dominated by species of mangrove (Rhizophoraceae).
- Some Arctic sea floor communities are dominated by brittle stars.
- Exposed rocky shorelines are dominated by sessile organisms such as barnacles and limpets.
- The turtle ant (Cephalotes pusillus), is thought to dominant arboreal ant communities in the Brazilian savannah.

There are currently several different metrics for assessing species dominance in natural ecosystems, including the importance value index, competitive index, community importance index, and dominance index.

== See also ==
- National Vegetation Classification, a system for classifying British plant communities by their dominant species
- Monodominance
