= Cerasicoccus arenae =

Scientific classification
- Domain: Bacteria
- Kingdom: Pseudomonadati
- Phylum: Verrucomicrobiota
- Class: Opitutia
- Order: Puniceicoccales
- Family: Cerasicoccaceae
- Genus: Cerasicoccus
- Species: C. arenae

Binomial name
- Cerasicoccus arenae Yoon et al. 2007

Type strain
- YM26-026

Species of bacterium

Cerasicoccus arenae is a Gram-negative, obligately aerobic and non-spore-forming bacterium from the genus Cerasicoccus which has been isolated from marine sand from Kamaishi. Cerasicoccus arenae can produce carotenoid.
