= Cerasicoccus =

Scientific classification
- Domain: Bacteria
- Kingdom: Pseudomonadati
- Phylum: Verrucomicrobiota
- Class: Opitutia
- Order: Puniceicoccales
- Family: Cerasicoccaceae
- Genus: Cerasicoccus; Yoon et al. 2007

Type species
- Cerasicoccus arenae Yoon et al. 2007

Species
- Cerasicoccus arenae; "Cerasicoccus fimbriatus"; "Cerasicoccus frondis"; "Cerasicoccus maritimus"

Genus of bacteria

Cerasicoccus is a Gram-negative, non-motile, obligately aerobic and chemoheterotrophic bacterial genus from the family Cerasicoccaceae.

== Phylogeny ==
The currently accepted taxonomy is based on the List of Prokaryotic names with Standing in Nomenclature (LPSN) and National Center for Biotechnology Information (NCBI).

16S rRNA based LTP_10_2024

- Cerasicoccus
  C. arenae

120 marker proteins based GTDB 10-RS226

- Cerasicoccus
  - C. arenae Yoon et al. 2007
  - - "C. frondis" Yoon et al. 2010
    - "C. maritimus" Yoon et al. 2010
