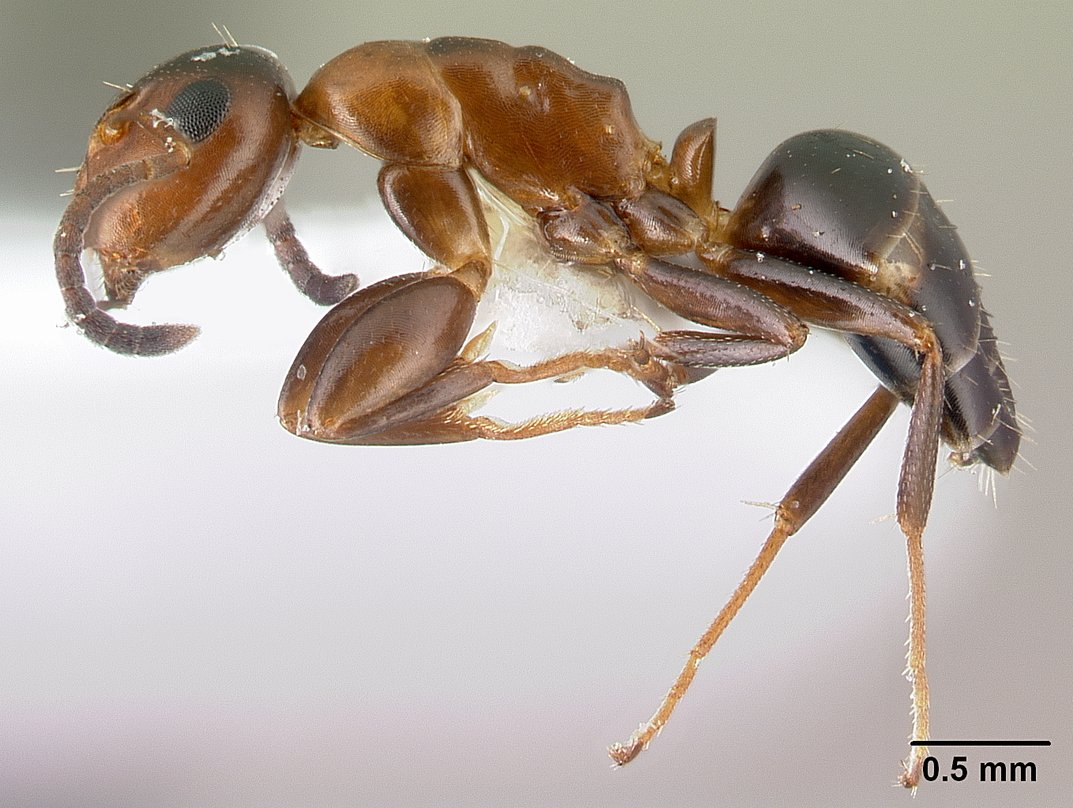
- Colobopsis truncata worker

Scientific classification
- Kingdom: Animalia
- Phylum: Arthropoda
- Clade: Pancrustacea
- Class: Insecta
- Order: Hymenoptera
- Family: Formicidae
- Subfamily: Formicinae
- Genus: Colobopsis
- Species: C. truncata

Binomial name
- Colobopsis truncata (Spinola, 1808)

= Colobopsis truncata =

Species of ant

Colobopsis truncata is a species of ant and type species of the genus Colobopsis. This species was first described in 1808 by M. Spinola, an Italian entomologist.

== Distribution ==
Colobopsis truncata is found in parts of Europe and Asia.

== Biology ==
This is an arboreal ant species that prefers to nest and forage in trees. The major worker subcaste is phragmotic, and uses its large head to block off the nest entrance against intruders.

Colobopsis truncata majors blocking nest entrance

They are a subordinate ant species. Colobopsis truncata are known to rarely follow the trails of Dolichoderus quadripunctatus. C. truncata is a batesian mimic of D. quadripunctatus.

== Taxonomy ==
Colobopsis imitans was long recognised under the name Colobopsis truncata. In 2021, C. imitans received species status, increasing the number of Colobopsis species found in Europe to 2.

== Identification ==
This species can easily be confused with the truncata-like color morph of Colobopsis imitans. The discriminant DColo = 0.1184 MGr + 0.0536 PrGr− 0.0418 PeSH + 0.0408 NOL + 0.0339 HTL− 0.0378 CW + 0.0105 ML− 9.1534 separates minor workers of Co. imitans from Co. truncata. Workers of Co. imitans have values > 0 (error rate 5.6% in 108 workers and 2.2% in 46 nest means) and workers of Co. truncata < 0 (error 2.0% in 100 workers and 0.0% in 40 nest means). This article incorporates Herbert C. Wagner and Sándor Csősz text available under the CC BY 4.0 license.
