= Terrimicrobium =

Scientific classification
- Domain: Bacteria
- Kingdom: Pseudomonadati
- Phylum: Verrucomicrobiota
- Class: Terrimicrobiia
- Order: Terrimicrobiales
- Family: Terrimicrobiaceae; García-López et al. 2020
- Genus: Terrimicrobium; Qiu et al. 2014
- Species: T. sacchariphilum

Binomial name
- Terrimicrobium sacchariphilum Qiu et al. 2014

Genus of bacteria

Terrimicrobium is a Gram-negative, mesophilic, non-spore-forming, strictly anaerobic and non-motile genus of bacteria from the family Terrimicrobiaceae with one known species (Terrimicrobium sacchariphilum). Terrimicrobium sacchariphilum has been isolated from a rice paddy field.
