= Dolichoderus quadripunctatus =

Scientific classification
- Kingdom: Animalia
- Phylum: Arthropoda
- Clade: Pancrustacea
- Class: Insecta
- Order: Hymenoptera
- Family: Formicidae
- Subfamily: Dolichoderinae
- Genus: Dolichoderus
- Species: D. quadripunctatus

Binomial name
- Dolichoderus quadripunctatus (Linnaeus, 1771)

Subspecies
- Dolichoderus quadripunctatus kratochvili V. Novak, 1941

Synonyms
- Dolichoderus quadripunctatus unicolor Ruzsky, 1905

Species of ant

Dolichoderus quadripunctatus is a species of ant in the genus Dolichoderus. Described by Carl Linnaeus in 1771, the species is present all over Europe and Asia.

== Biology ==
This is an arboreal ant species. The coloration of this species is aposematic. Batesian mimics of this species include the ant species Colobopsis truncata and Colobopsis imitans.

== Colony Demography ==
This species is monogynous.
