= Fucophilus =

Scientific classification
- Domain: Bacteria
- Phylum: Verrucomicrobiota
- Class: incertae sedis
- Order: incertae sedis
- Family: incertae sedis
- Genus: "Fucophilus" Sakai et al. 2003
- Species: "F. fucoidanolyticus"

Binomial name
- "Fucophilus fucoidanolyticus" Sakai et al. 2001

Genus of bacteria

Fucophilus is a fucoidan-utilizing genus of bacteria from the phylum Verrucomicrobiota with one known species, Fucophilus fucoidanolyticus. Fucophilus fucoidanolyticus has been isolated from the gut content of a sea cucumber (Stichopus japonicus).
