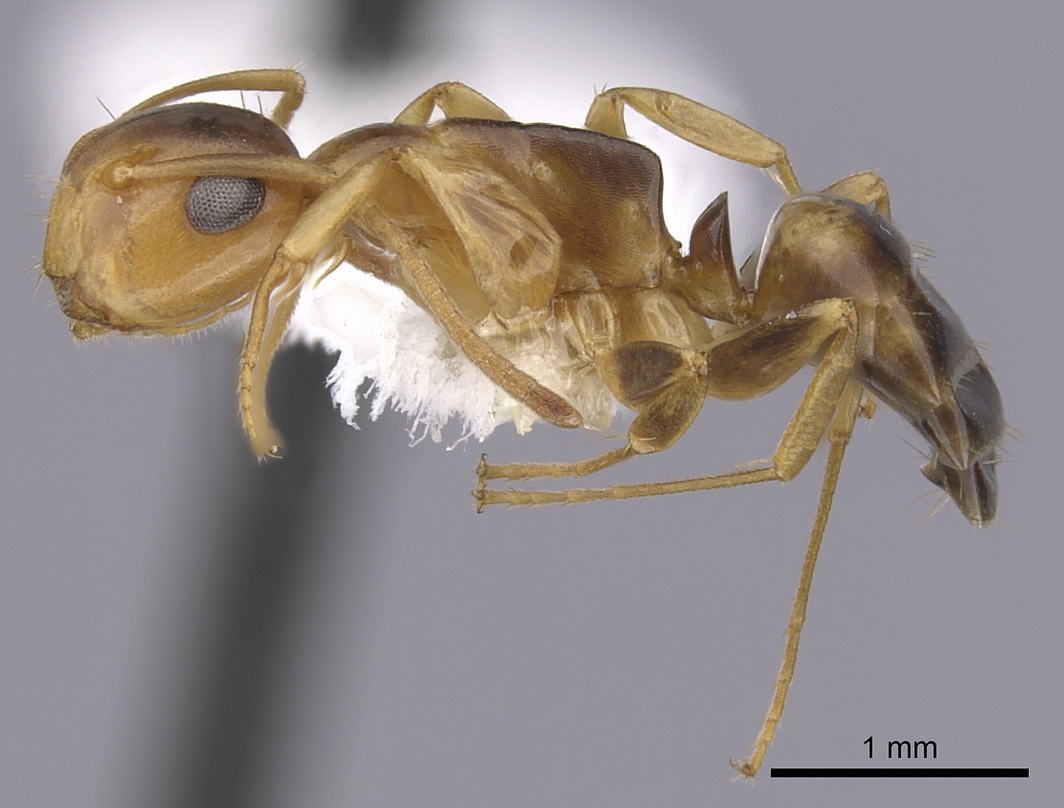
- Colobopsis abdita worker

Scientific classification
- Kingdom: Animalia
- Phylum: Arthropoda
- Clade: Pancrustacea
- Class: Insecta
- Order: Hymenoptera
- Family: Formicidae
- Subfamily: Formicinae
- Genus: Colobopsis
- Species: C. abdita

Binomial name
- Colobopsis abdita Forel, 1899

Synonyms
- Camponotus abditus

= Colobopsis abdita =

Species of ant

Colobopsis abdita (synonym Camponotus abditus) is a species of ant endemic to Guatemala. It was described by Auguste Forel in 1899.

Based on specimen collections, C. abditus ants are found in montane rainforest edge habitats, at elevations of 1,140 metres (3,740 ft). This species is rather small. Workers are normally 3.5 – 4 mm in length, soldiers at 5 – 6 mm, males at 4 - 4.5 mm, and the queens are 7.5 mm, making them the largest of the colony.
