= Importance Value Index =

Measure of biodiversity

The Importance Value Index (IVI) in Ecology is the quantitative measure of how dominant a species is in a given ecosystem. It combines multiple parameters to reflect a species' overall dominance, helping to describe the structure and composition of ecosystems.

== Components ==
The IVI is calculated by summing three relative measures for each species in a given area:

- Relative density – the number of individuals of a species divided by the total number of individuals of all species.
- Relative frequency – the frequency of a species (i.e., the proportion of plots in which it occurs) relative to the sum of frequencies for all species.
- Relative dominance – typically based on basal area (for trees) or canopy cover, representing the area occupied by a species compared to the total.

IVI = Relative Density + Relative Frequency + Relative Dominance

Each of these components is expressed as a percentage, so the IVI ranges from 0 to 300.

== Applications ==
IVI is commonly used in vegetation analysis and forest ecology to:

- Identify dominant and co-dominant species.
- Understand successional stages in ecological communities.
- Guide conservation efforts and habitat management.

It offers insight into species' ecological roles beyond simple abundance by incorporating spatial and distributional data.

== Example ==
In a forest plot, three tree species are sampled. If Species A has high abundance, occurs frequently across plots, and occupies a large basal area, its IVI would be significantly higher than that of a rare, spatially restricted, or small-canopy species. Researchers often present IVI rankings to show the ecological dominance hierarchy within a study area.

== Limitations ==
Although useful, the IVI has some limitations:

- It is scale-dependent and can vary with sampling methods and plot size.
- It gives equal weight to density, frequency, and dominance, which may not always reflect ecological significance.
- It may not be directly comparable across different ecosystem types.

== See also ==
- Ecological dominance
- Biodiversity
