= Colobopsis ceylonica =

Scientific classification
- Domain: Eukaryota
- Kingdom: Animalia
- Phylum: Arthropoda
- Class: Insecta
- Order: Hymenoptera
- Family: Formicidae
- Subfamily: Formicinae
- Genus: Colobopsis
- Species: C. ceylonica

Binomial name
- Colobopsis ceylonica (Emery, 1925)

Synonyms
- Camponotus testacea Bingham, 1903; Camponotus ceylonicus Emery, 1925

Species of ant

Colobopsis ceylonica is a species of formicine ant. It is found from Sri Lanka.
