= Methylacidiphilum infernorum =

Scientific classification (Candidatus)
- Domain: Bacteria
- Phylum: Verrucomicrobiota
- Class: Unclassified
- Order: Methylacidiphilales
- Family: Methylacidiphilaceae
- Genus: Methylacidiphilum
- Species: M. infernorum

Binomial name
- Methylacidiphilum infernorum Hou et al. 2008

Type strain
- Isolate V4

Synonyms
- Methylokorus infernorum Dunfield et al. 2007; Strain V4 Dunfield et al. 2007; Candidatus Methylacidiphilum infernorum Hou et al.

Species of bacterium

Methylacidiphilum infernorum is an extremely acidophilic methanotrophic aerobic bacteria first isolated and described in 2007 growing on soil and sediment on Hell's Gate, New Zealand. Similar organisms have also been isolated from geothermal sites on Italy and Russia.

A polyextremophile, these non-motile rods grows optimally at pH between 2.0 and 2.5 and temperature of 60 °C. It is a methanotrophic obligated bacteria that grows at 25% (v/v) of methane in air. It is also very dependent on carbon dioxide concentrations to grow, optimally at 8% (v/v) CO_{2} in air.

Due to its classification in the phylum Verrucomicrobiota and its extreme acidophilic phenotype M. infernorum is unique between all known methanotrophs.

== Biology ==
=== Genome ===
It has a single circular chromosome of 2,287,145 base pairs. Under genome analysis it was found that M. infernorum may use a novel methylotrophic pathway because it encodes methane monooxygenase enzymes but lacks known genetic modules for methanol and formaldehyde oxidation.

All the enzymes required for the Calvin Benson Bassham cycle were identify by genetic analysis.

=== Metabolism ===
It has been predicted that M. infernorum possess most of the key metabolic pathways for the biosynthesis of all amino acids, nucleotides and cofactors, with the sole exception of the cobalamin cofactor.

Genetic studies have shown that the enzymes it uses in several metabolic pathways differs to the ones used by other methylotrophs like for example in the biosynthesis of aromatic amino acids, lipoic acid biosynthesis, urea cycle and in the number and diversity of transporters encoded.

The bacteria is able to counteract extreme acidic environments thanks to the presence of various enzymes like glutamate decarboxylase, glutamate/γ-aminobutyrate antiporter, arginine decarboxylase and an arginine/agmatine antiporter.
