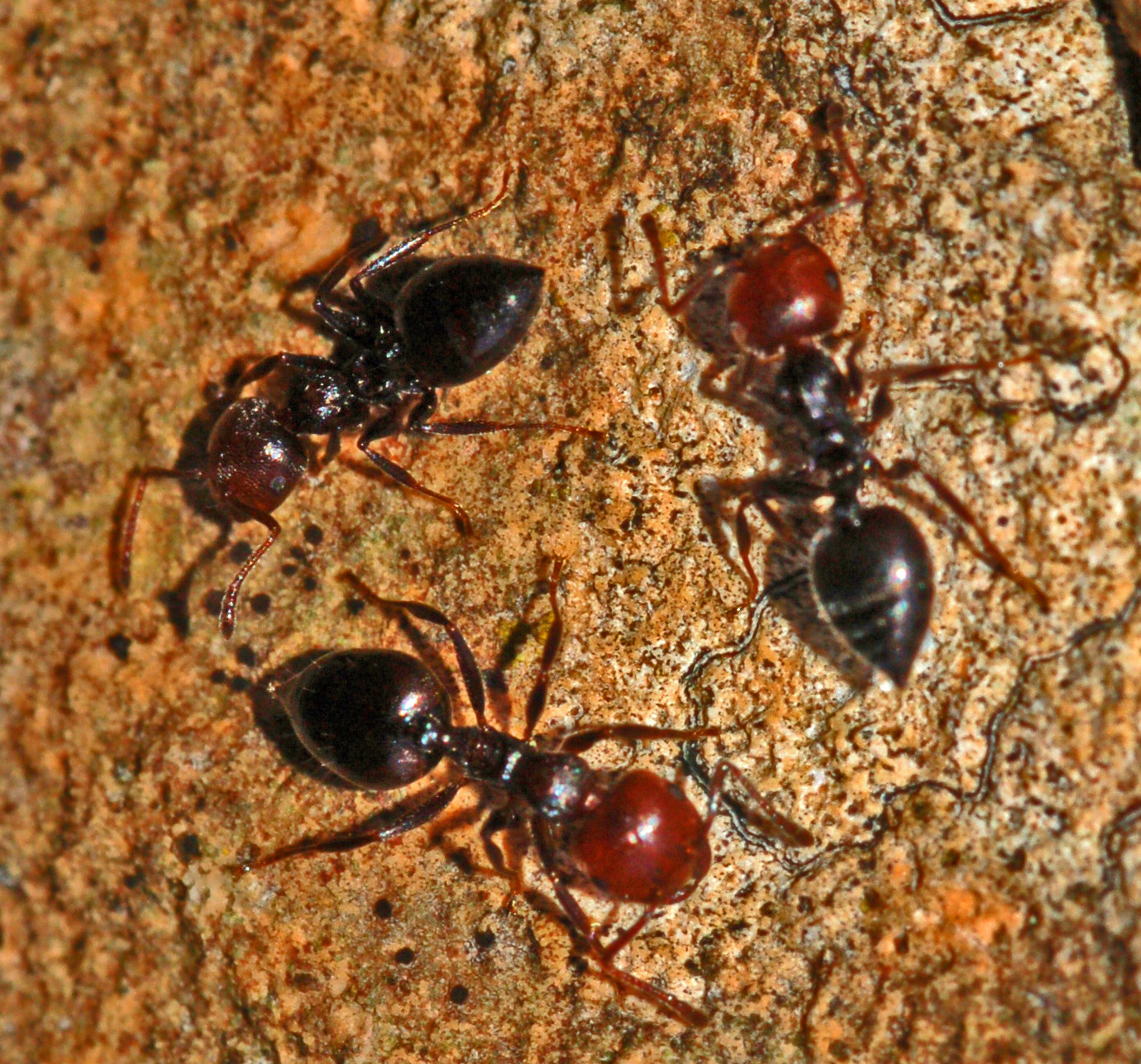

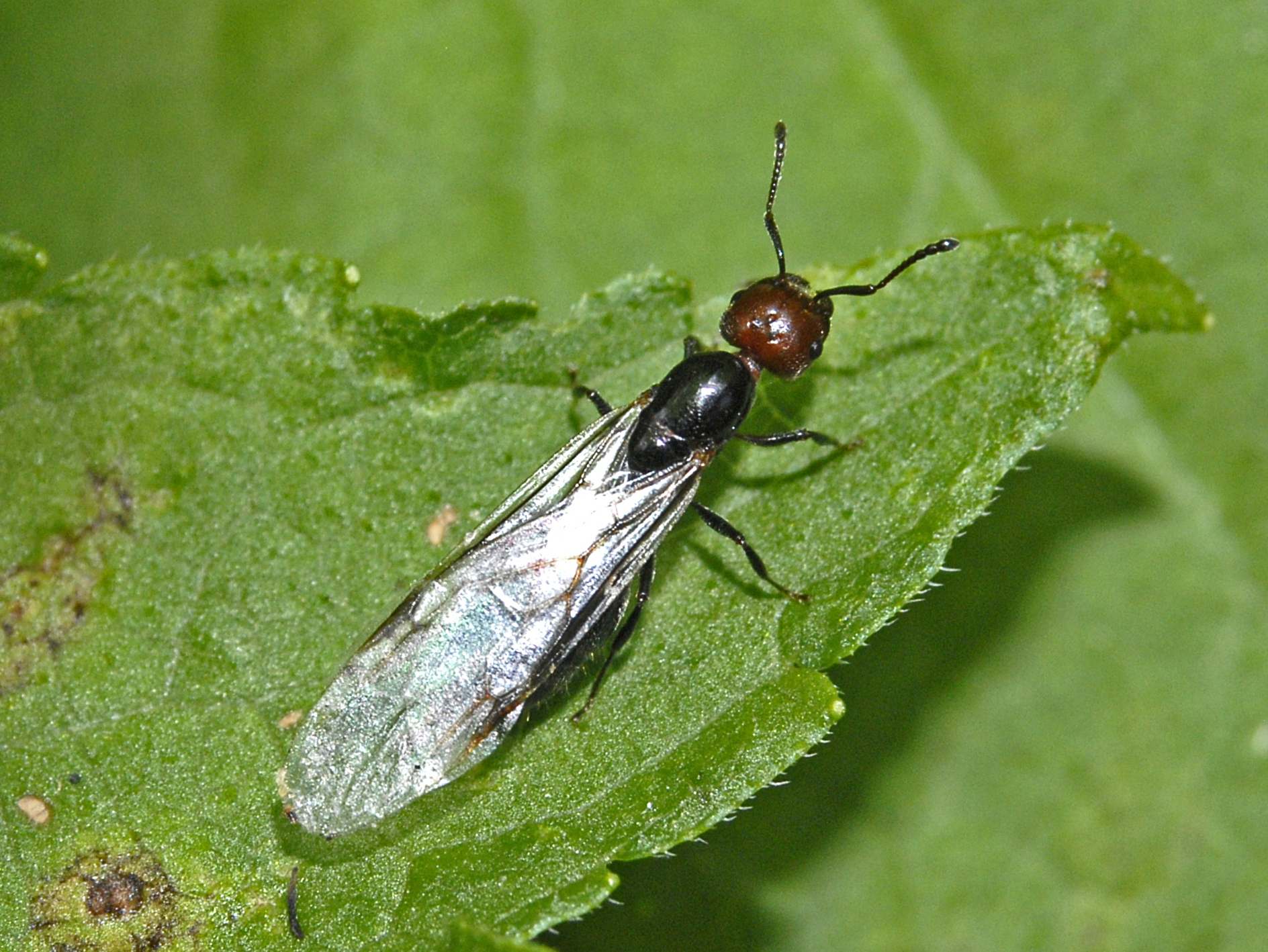
- Winged female

Scientific classification
- Kingdom: Animalia
- Phylum: Arthropoda
- Clade: Pancrustacea
- Class: Insecta
- Order: Hymenoptera
- Family: Formicidae
- Subfamily: Myrmicinae
- Genus: Crematogaster
- Species: C. scutellaris

Binomial name
- Crematogaster scutellaris (Olivier, 1792)

= Crematogaster scutellaris =

Species of ant

Crematogaster scutellaris is a species of ant belonging to the family Formicidae, subfamily Myrmicinae.

== Description ==
Crematogaster scutellaris can reach a length of about 8 mm in the queen, while the workers rarely exceed 5 mm. These ants have reddish head and black thorax and abdomen. The shape of the abdomen is characteristic, as it gradually narrows toward the apex.

They raise menacingly their pointed abdomen when they are feeling attacked, emitting a small drop of pheromones from the rear end. The smell of the pheromone causes a general mobilization in the nest and any intruder is soon surrounded by a mass of aggressive ants.

== Biology and ecology ==
Crematogaster scutellaris establish independent monogynous colonies, but with the possibility of oligogyny (multiple queens are accepted by the workers in the colony, but the queens are aggressive among them). Winged males and queens can be found at the end of summer, but sometimes even until the end of October, if it is not very cold.

They usually build their colonies mainly in stumps and fallen logs or dead branches. Between March and October workers collect and carry mainly sugary liquid substances and solid materials (remains of arthropods, small insects, etc. ).

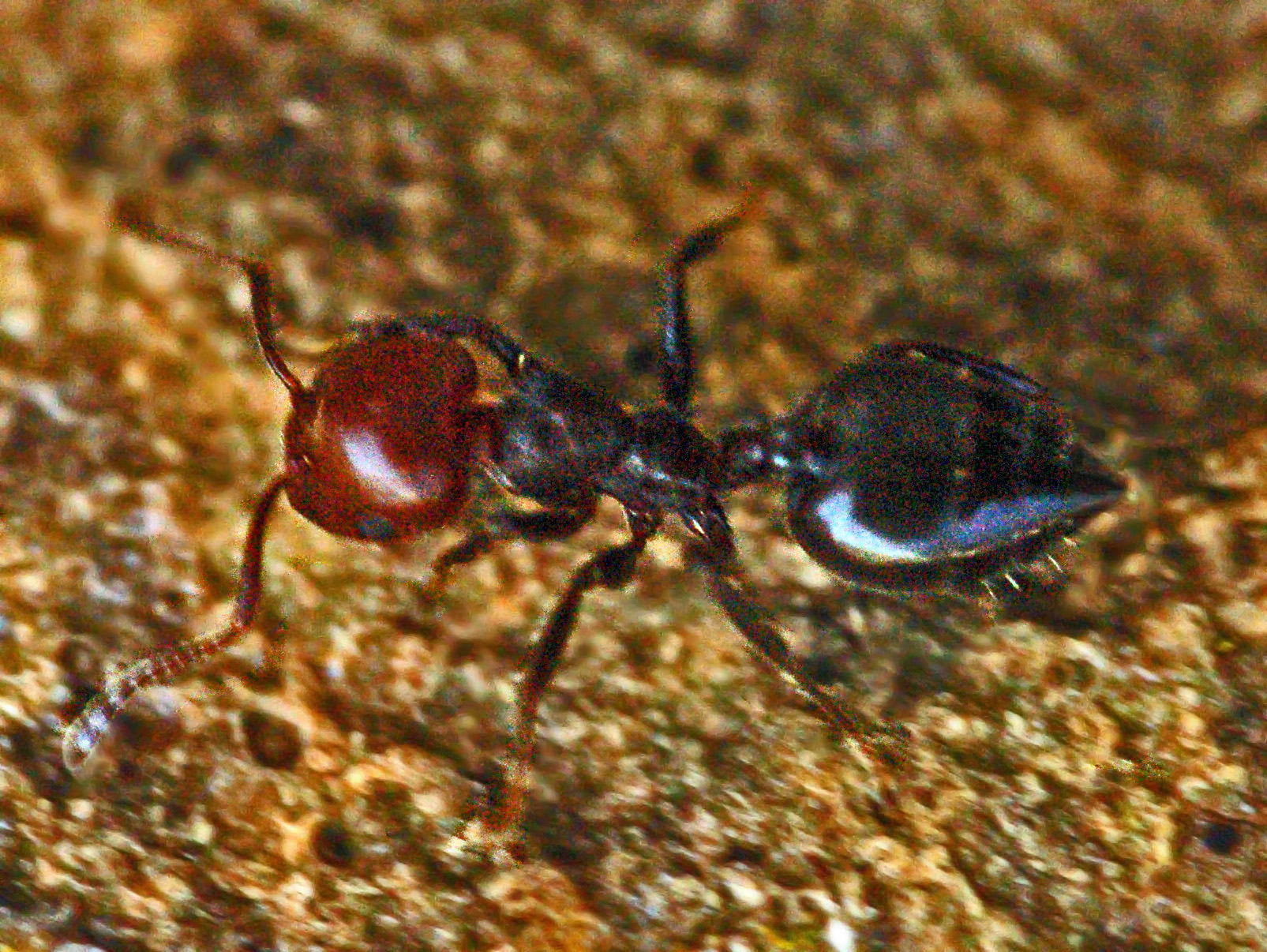
Close-up on Crematogaster scutellaris

Spawning usually takes place during the summer. This species is very prolific. The larvae hatch primarily in September and overwinter in the second stage, from November to February at about 10 °C. The following spring the third instar larvae develop, pupating in the summer. By mid to late summer the worker appear, while sexed individuals appear in late August.

These ants are natural predators of Thaumetopoea pityocampa, a moth that is a devastating pest of Mediterranean pines (especially Pinus halepensis).

They also transport live aphids into oak-gall nests. Currently there is no evidence of immediate predation of these aphids inside the galls, so they are likely stored to overwinter due to a mutualistic relationship and/or serve as food storage.

== Distribution ==
This species has a Western Mediterannean Distribution, inhabiting parts of Africa and Europe. In the Northeastern mediterranean basin and most of the Balkans, it is replaced by its sister species Crematogaster schmidti and other members of the Crematogaster scutellaris species group.
