= Pelagicoccus =

Scientific classification
- Domain: Bacteria
- Kingdom: Pseudomonadati
- Phylum: Verrucomicrobiota
- Class: Opitutia
- Order: Opitutales
- Family: Pelagicoccaceae; Min et al. 2023
- Genus: Pelagicoccus; Yoon et al. 2007

Type species
- Pelagicoccus mobilis Yoon et al. 2007

Species
- Pelagicoccus albus; Pelagicoccus croceus; Pelagicoccus enzymogenes; Pelagicoccus litoralis; Pelagicoccus mobilis

Genus of bacteria

Pelagicoccus is a Gram-negative genus of bacteria from the family Pelagicoccaceae.

== Phylogeny ==
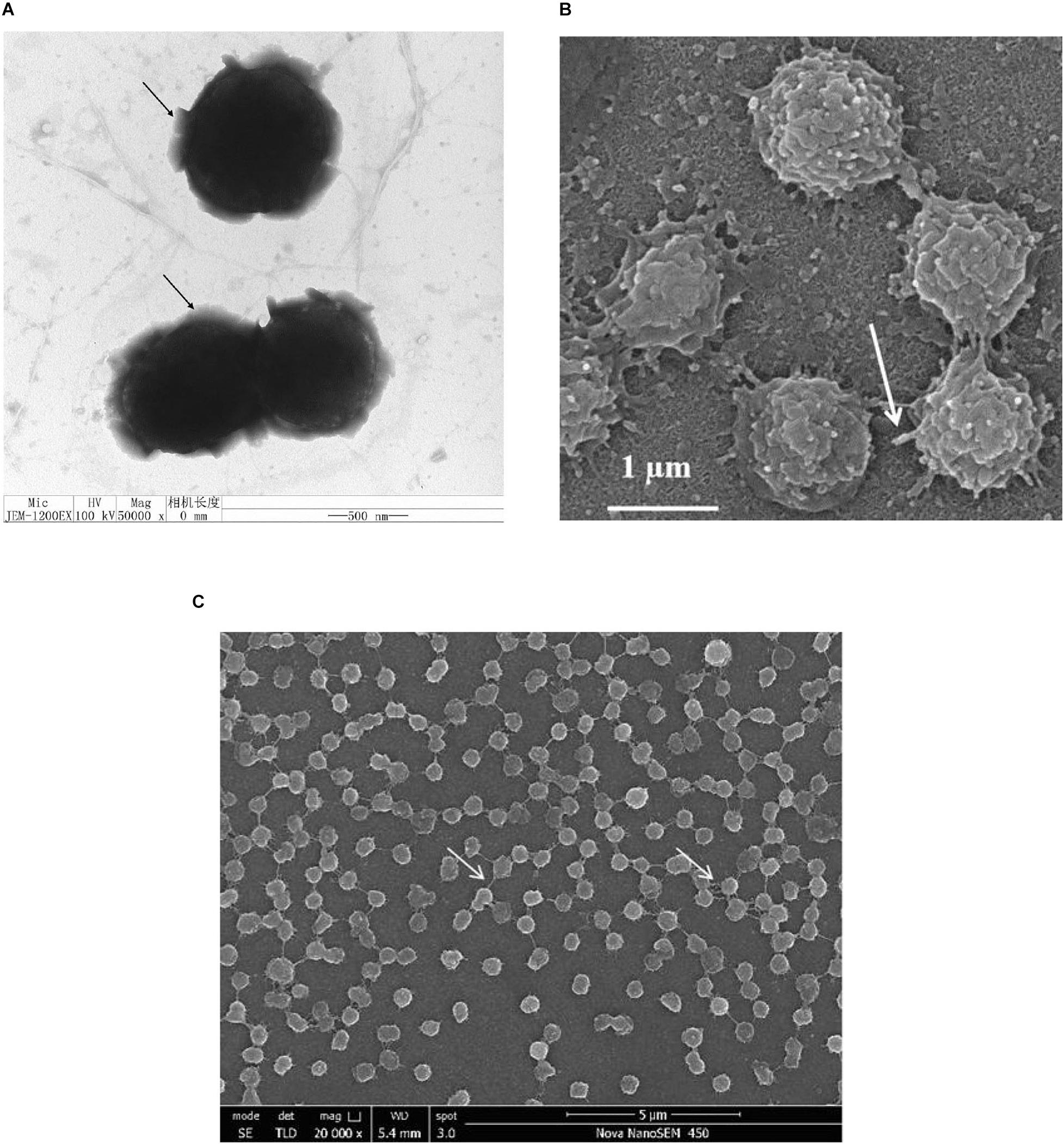
Pelagicoccus enzymogenes. Shape and ultrastructure of cells of strain NFK12T. Cells were grown in MB at 33°C for 2 days. (A) Transmission electron microscopy. Arrows in panel a indicate ‘capsular’ EPS around the cells. Scale bar, 0.5 μm. (B) Scanning electron microscopy. Arrows indicate randomly distributed finger-like extensions from which fimbriae appendages. Scale bar, 1.0 μm. (C) Scanning electron microscopy. Arrows indicate ‘bridge’ extracellular polysaccharides (EPS). Scale bar, 5.0 μm.

The currently accepted taxonomy is based on the List of Prokaryotic names with Standing in Nomenclature (LPSN) and National Center for Biotechnology Information (NCBI).

16S rRNA based LTP_10_2024

- Pelagicoccus
  - P. croceus Yoon et al. 2007
  - - P. litoralis Yoon et al. 2007
    - - P. mobilis Yoon et al. 2007
      - - P. albus Yoon et al. 2007
        - P. enzymogenes Feng et al. 2022

120 marker proteins based GTDB 10-RS226

- Pelagicoccus
  - P. enzymogenes
  - - P. albus
    - P. mobilis
