= Colobopsis imitans =

- Colobopsis imitans minor worker

Scientific classification
- Kingdom: Animalia
- Phylum: Arthropoda
- Clade: Pancrustacea
- Class: Insecta
- Order: Hymenoptera
- Family: Formicidae
- Subfamily: Formicinae
- Genus: Colobopsis
- Species: C. imitans

Binomial name
- Colobopsis imitans Schifani, Giannetti, Csősz, Castellucci, Luchetti, Castracani, Spotti, Mori & Grasso, 2021

Species of ant

Colobopsis imitans, the chameleon ant, is a species of ant of the genus Colobopsis.

== Biology ==
This species is highly associated with many arboreal subdominant ants of the mediterranean basin. These include Dolichoderus quadripunctatus, Crematogaster scutellaris, Crematogaster ionia, Crematogaster cf. ionia (Cyprus), Crematogaster ariadnae, and possibly Crematogaster schmidti. Where it occurs in sympatry with these species it mimics their coloration and follows their trails.
