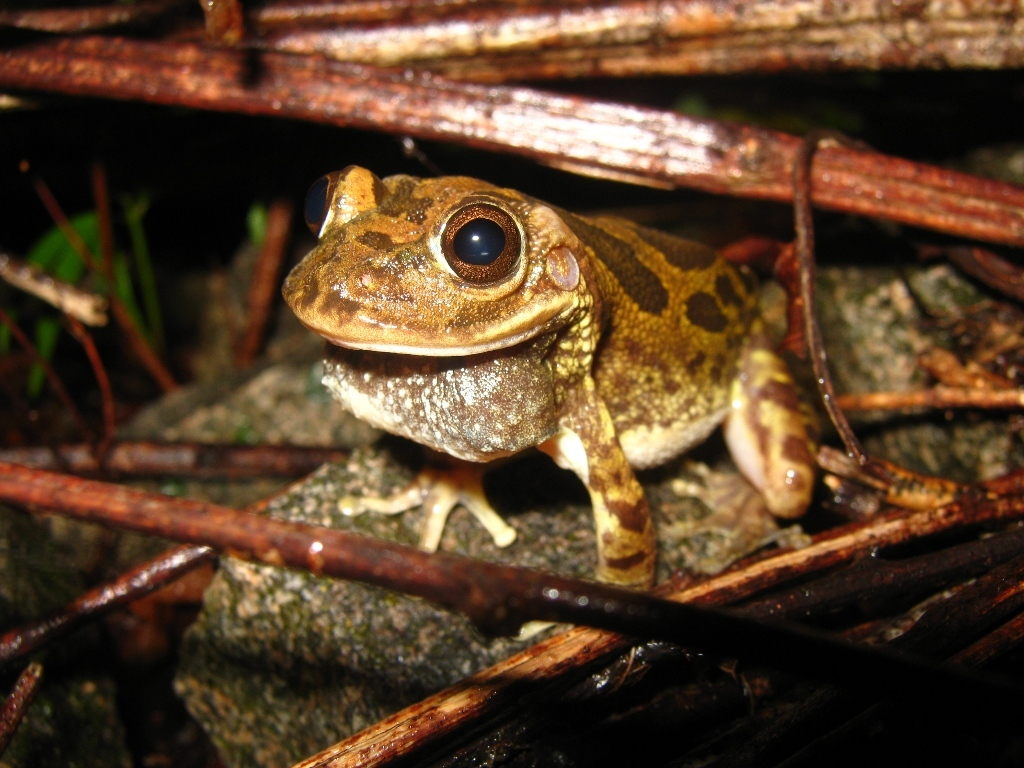

Conservation status
- Least Concern (IUCN 3.1)

Scientific classification
- Kingdom: Animalia
- Phylum: Chordata
- Class: Amphibia
- Order: Anura
- Family: Hylidae
- Genus: Smilisca
- Species: S. fodiens

Binomial name
- Smilisca fodiens (Boulenger, 1882)

Synonyms
- Pternohyla fodiens Boulenger, 1882; Hyla rudis Mocquard, 1899

= Lowland burrowing tree frog =

Species of amphibian

The lowland burrowing tree frog or northern casquehead frog (Smilisca fodiens) is a species of frog in the family Hylidae. It is found in south-central Arizona, the United States, and southward along the coastal plain and foothills to Western and South-Central Mexico. Its natural habitats are open mesquite grassland and tropical scrub forests at elevations from near sea level to about 1,490 m (4,890 ft) above sea level. It is a burrowing frog that is common in rain-filled temporary pools, its breeding habitat. It is threatened by habitat loss caused by agricultural development. However, many well-preserved populations have been recorded.
