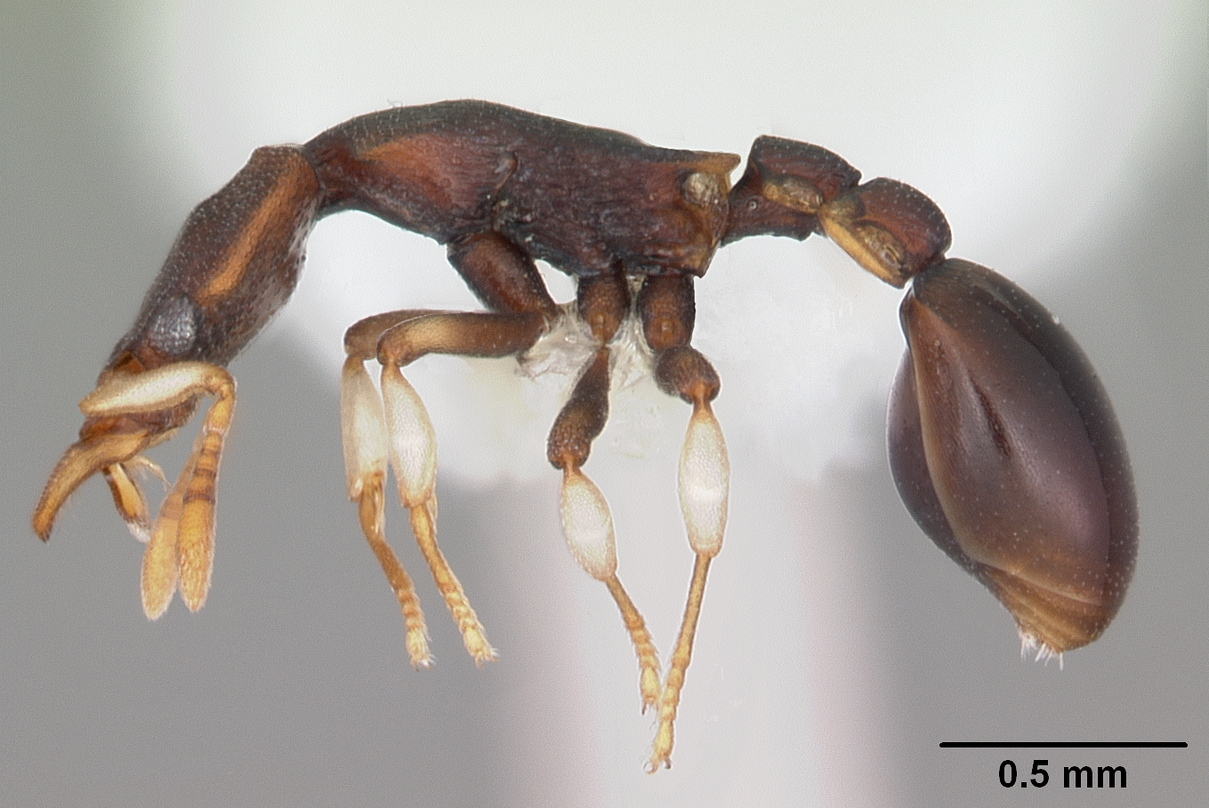
- Colobostruma foliacea worker

Scientific classification
- Kingdom: Animalia
- Phylum: Arthropoda
- Class: Insecta
- Order: Hymenoptera
- Family: Formicidae
- Subfamily: Myrmicinae
- Tribe: Attini
- Genus: Colobostruma; Wheeler, 1927

Type species
- Epopostruma leae Wheeler, 1927

Diversity
- 16 species

Synonyms
- Alistruma Brown, 1948; Clarkistruma Brown, 1948

= Colobostruma =

Genus of ants

Colobostruma is a genus of ants in the subfamily Myrmicinae. All except one species are restricted to Australia. The only non-Australian species, C. foliacea, is found in New Guinea and the Solomon Islands.

== Species ==
- Colobostruma alinodis (Forel, 1913)
- Colobostruma australis Brown, 1959
- Colobostruma biconcava Shattuck, 2000
- Colobostruma biconvexa Shattuck, 2000
- Colobostruma bicorna Shattuck, 2000
- Colobostruma cerornata Brown, 1959
- Colobostruma elliotti (Clark, 1928)
- Colobostruma foliacea (Emery, 1897)
- Colobostruma froggatti (Forel, 1913)
- Colobostruma lacuna Shattuck, 2000
- Colobostruma leae (Wheeler, 1927)
- Colobostruma mellea Shattuck, 2000
- Colobostruma nancyae Brown, 1965
- Colobostruma papulata Brown, 1965
- Colobostruma sisypha Shattuck, 2000
- Colobostruma unicorna Shattuck, 2000
