= Lentimonas =

Scientific classification
- Domain: Bacteria
- Phylum: Verrucomicrobiota
- Class: Opitutia
- Order: Puniceicoccales
- Family: Puniceicoccaceae
- Genus: Lentimonas Choo & Cho 2006

Type species
- Lentimonas marisflavi Choo & Cho 2006

Species
- L. marisflavi

Genus of bacteria

Lentimonas is a bacterial genus from the family of Puniceicoccaceae with one known species (Lentimonas marisflavi).
