= Gene sequencing =

Gene sequencing may refer to:

- DNA sequencing, the process of determining the nucleic acid sequence – the order of nucleotides in DNA
- Whole genome sequencing, the process of determining the entirety of the DNA sequence of an organism's genome at a single time
