= Colobopsis anderseni =

Scientific classification
- Kingdom: Animalia
- Phylum: Arthropoda
- Clade: Pancrustacea
- Class: Insecta
- Order: Hymenoptera
- Family: Formicidae
- Subfamily: Formicinae
- Genus: Colobopsis
- Species: C. anderseni

Binomial name
- Colobopsis anderseni (McArthur & Shattuck, 2001)

Synonyms
- Camponotus anderseni

Species of mangrove ant

Colobopsis anderseni, synonym Camponotus anderseni, is a species of mangrove ant found in northern Australia.

== Taxonomy ==
The species was originally placed in the ant genus Camponotus when described in 2001 as Camponotus (Colobopsis) anderseni. In a revision of the ant subfamily Formicinae published in 2016 the subgenus C. (Colobopsis) found to be phylogenetically distinct from the other subgenera for Camponotus. As a result, the subgenus was raised to full genus status as Colobopsis, with the species moved out of Camponotus, resulting in the new binomial Colobopsis anderseni.

== Description ==
Colobopsis anderseni is light brown and glossy. Like any insect, its body contains three sections. The first part is called the prosoma while the middle part is called the mesosoma, and the posterior part is called the metasoma. The dorsum, or posterior side, of the mesosoma on C. anderseni is flattened. It also has distinct metanotum on the posterior of the thorax. It is lacking erect setae under its head, and its body is slightly raised on the tibiae, or fourth joint of each leg. Its eyes elongate looking outward, nearer to the mandibles than the vertex. It is dimorphic, meaning there are two separate forms based on class. In major workers, the clypeus is depressed and finely punctate. The anterior margin is convex. In minor workers, the clypeus is wide, and the anterior margin is convex and projecting.

== Geography ==
Colobopsis anderseni has only been found in the mangroves of northern Australia. It is found exclusively in twigs of the mangrove tree Sonneratia alba. These trees can be found in the Kimberly region in the North Territory of Western Australia. According to recent studies, C. anderseni are the only species of ant known to live in the twigs of these trees, and recent studies showed that approximately 81% of the ant nests in the canopy of the mangrove tree Sonneratia alba were occupied by C. anderseni. The remaining nests were inhabited by three species of Tapinoma, two species of Crematogaster, Monomorium floricola, and Tetraponera punctulata.

== Ecology ==
=== Flooding in the mangroves ===
Some select species of ants live in the Australian mangroves because the advantage of living in a mangrove is less competition from other ants. Unfortunately, this is because the mangrove is considered to be highly undesirable by most ant species due to the two daily inundations. However, all mangrove ants have a remarkable ability that allows them to survive these floods which would otherwise exterminate all ant colonies in a single wave. All of these ants use some method to create a sealed pocket of air to protect from any water gathering inside the nest. To avoid drowning during high tide, some ants escape to higher parts of the trees, whereas others hide in air-filled cavities in the mangrove trees or in air pockets in the mangrove mud. These retreats have limited air volumes, and they are therefore subject to extreme changes in the oxygen and carbon dioxide concentrations. This creates a problem when there are limited oxygen levels for large colonies.

=== Oxygen deprivation in nests ===
This problem was studied by a group of professors from the Department of Biological Science in the University of Aarhus, Denmark and the School of Science at Charles Darwin University in Darwin, Australia. They studied Colobopsis anderseni in a series of experiments to determine varying carbon dioxide and oxygen levels in nests. During inundation, a soldier sacrifices herself to block the entrance hole with her head which effectively prevents flooding inside the nest. Once this occurs, the area can be very crowded, with the ants and coccids filling up to half the volume, and the conditions in the nests during a flood become hypercapnic and hypoxic.

Each nest has only one entrance, and the opening is only about 1.56mm in diameter. The diameter of the galleries is only approximately 2.31 mm. During normal conditions with open nests, the oxygen depletion is substantial in the part of the nest most distant from the opening, and in a 120 mm long nest the oxygen concentration can be as low as 15.7%. During simulated inundation, in which the nest entrances were blocked, the oxygen concentration dropped to less than 0.5% after one hour. After opening the nest entrance, the oxygen concentration increased again, but for a 100 mm long nest it took nearly 20 minutes before the concentration was back to the normal depressed level.

The dilemma faced by C. anderseni is to avoid drowning without suffering anoxia or hypercapnia, and they show a remarkable ability to adapt to the extreme conditions in the mangrove and exploit a niche where the density of other ants is insignificant. By adapting to these hostile situations, mangrove ants have developed the ability to switch to anaerobic respiration. This was proven by the observed oxygen and carbon dioxide levels. Oxygen uptake in the nests eventually stopped, but the carbon dioxide production continued. This indicates high levels of anaerobic respiration.

A similar study was conducted by Nielsen and other associates with another Australian mangrove ant, Polyrhachis sokolova. This mangrove species has been known to use the front four legs as oars and the back two legs as rudders in order to swim back to the nest directly before inundation. At this point, the ants retreat into their nest in the mud, which creates an air pocket and blocks out the incoming tide. The question was again raised about the ant's source of air, and the study on carbon dioxide levels in the nests of Polyrhachis sokolova was conducted. The experiment concluded with results similar to the study of C. anderseni nests with evidence that the ants had achieved anaerobic respiration.

C. anderseni and the study involving this species have made significant contributions to the scientific community. This study alongside the study on Polyrhachis sokolova has supplied the only published work explaining the unique ability for mangrove ants to breathe anaerobically. Before these studies, there was no notable explanation among scientists for many ant species surviving in mangrove inundations.

== Queens and workers ==
In another experiment by Morgens Gissel Nielsen, colonies of Colobopsis aderseni were observed and behaviors were recorded. New queens of C. anderseni were regularly observed gnawing small cavities in the green terminal shoots of Sonneratia trees, and this species occupied all of the examined terminal nest-cavities. It was thereby concluded that all ant galleries in Sonneratia branches are founded by this species. However the densities of these ants in Sonneratia trees differs greatly even in close vicinities because of the remote characteristics of these trees. The base of the Sonneratia trees is usually surrounded by sea water. Therefore, each tree functions as an island. After the queens have landed and lost their wings, they have very limited capacity for dispersal to neighboring trees.

One of the notable observations in this study is that queens and workers of C. anderseni were never found in the same nest cavity. No queens were found in any of the 225 dissected nest chambers containing C. anderseni. In an additional 400 nests collected from other areas, queens were only found in the soft green shoots at the terminal ends of the branches of Sonneratia and were never together with workers. In the older nest chambers, workers were always present, regardless of the number of brood and alates. Furthermore, it was not possible the find an egg-laying queen in the main nest chambers of nests. Many believe that the only plausible explanation for the observed demographic variation in the nests of Colobopsis anderseni is to assume that the species has some form of thelytokous parthenogenesis, which is known from only very few species. This hypothesis is currently being tested with DNA micro satellite markers.

== Behavior ==
Colobopsis anderseni workers of neighboring nests are known to be highly aggressive to each other. This was observed in a careful study from the University of Aarhus by watching neighboring ants in their environment as well as in a laboratory. When ants from different nests were placed together in a Petri dish, several began to fight. This indicates that nests represent separate colonies.

== Colony size ==
Because each nest represents a separate colony, there are exceptionally small colonies, which are a clear adaptation to the high degree of environmental variability. A large colony requires either many small nest chambers or a few larger ones. The exchange between the many small chambers will increase the time the workers spend outside the nests and therefore also the degree of predation. More important for this species is the possibility of being washed away by the tide, waves or heavy rainstorms. Large nest cavities require very long hollowed twigs, which break easily during strong winds, potentially resulting in the ants being washed away. Larger cavities in thicker branches require the ants to excavate hard wood, which did not seem to be the case for this species. A more serious problem is the coccids, which primarily require cavities with a thin wall. Finally, a large cavity with several entrances and a large volume of air is much more difficult to keep waterproof during flooding.

== Diet ==
Colobopsis anderseni are rarely seen foraging which has led scientists to believe that these ants rely on another food source. Due to the high numbers of coccids, their main food source is most likely honeydew. Very little is known about the dispersion of coccids to new chambers. It seems unlikely that the new queens transport coccids during nuptial flights, because no coccids are ever found in chambers less than 6 weeks old.
