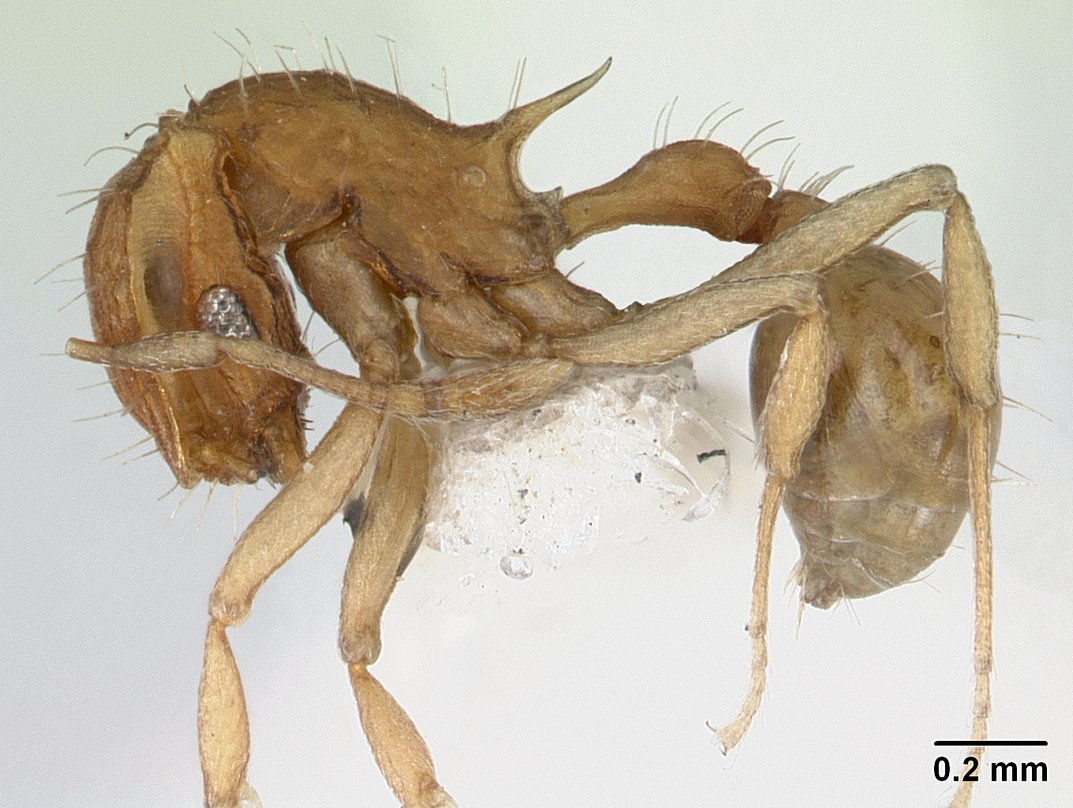
- Blepharidatta brasiliensis worker

Scientific classification
- Kingdom: Animalia
- Phylum: Arthropoda
- Class: Insecta
- Order: Hymenoptera
- Family: Formicidae
- Subfamily: Myrmicinae
- Tribe: Attini
- Genus: Blepharidatta; Wheeler, 1915

Type species
- Blepharidatta brasiliensis Wheeler, 1915

Diversity
- 2 species

= Blepharidatta =

Genus of ants

Blepharidatta is a rare Neotropical genus of ants in the subfamily Myrmicinae. The genus, formed by predatory species whose small colonies nest in soil or leaf-litter, has up to seven species, but most of them are waiting for a formal taxonomic treatment or confirmation.

== Species ==
- Blepharidatta brasiliensis Wheeler, 1915
- Blepharidatta conops Kempf, 1967

In 2015 two new species were described:

- Blepharidatta delabiei sp. n. Brandão et al., 2015
- Blepharidatta fernandezi sp. n. Brandão et al., 2015

== Distribution and habitat ==
Blepharidatta is a strictly Neotropical group that was described by Wheeler (1915) from workers of Blepharidatta brasiliensis collected near Belém (State of Pará, Brazil), in the Amazon forest.

Up to seven species are currently recognized, but most of them are waiting for a formal taxonomic treatment or confirmation. Based on morphological as well as behavioral data, only three species are formally recognized: B. brasiliensis found in the Amazonian forest, Blepharidatta conops, an inhabitant of savanna-like formation from central Brazil (Cerrado), and an undescribed species (Blepharidatta "sp-ba") (Note: Informal name used by Pereira et al. (2014)) known from the Atlantic rainforest of the State of Bahia, eastern Brazil. All are ground-dwelling predatory species that nest in the ground or in the leaf-litter, with small monogynous or polygynous colonies. Queens are ergatoid (i.e. permanently wingless and worker-like) and, at least in B. conops, it is believed that the foundation of new colonies is by fission of established colonies.

== Nests ==
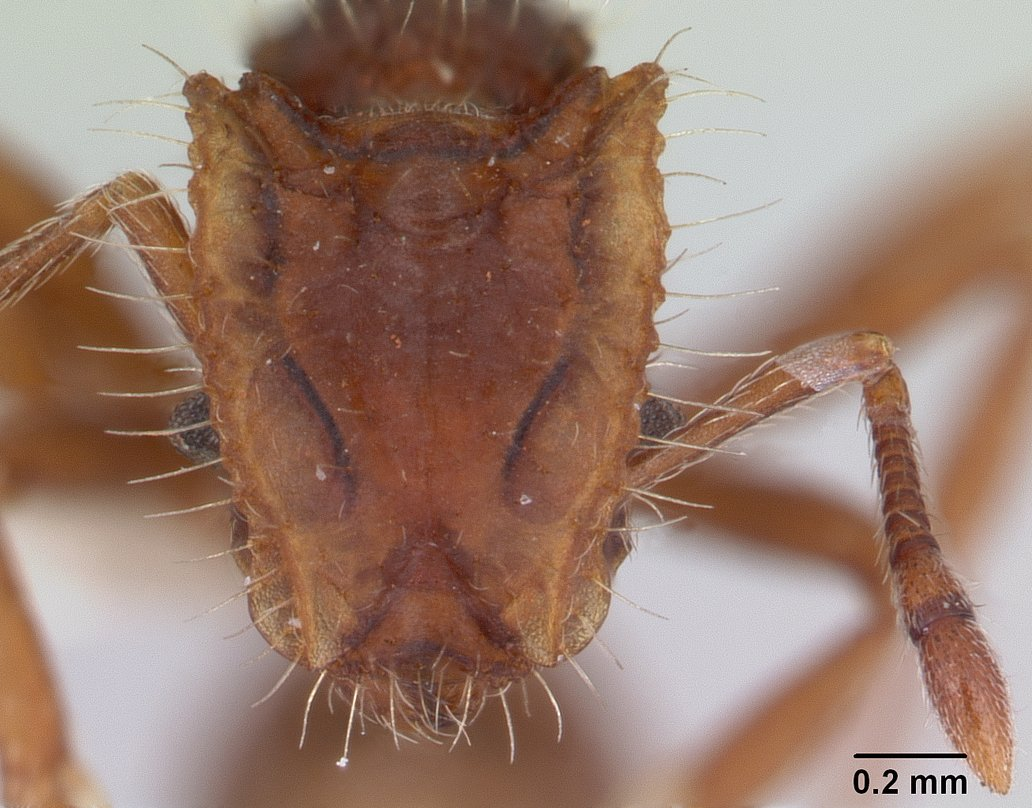
Head of a Blepharidatta conops worker

The best studied species is B. conops. Blepharidatta conops colonies (up to 250 workers) live in simple nests with a single opening and a vertical tunnel with 2 cm of diameter and 20 cm deep that ends in a cone-shaped widening at the bottom. Furthermore, all mature nests have a horizontal subsidiary chamber connected to the vertical tunnel through a narrow tunnel that opens at the mid-length of the vertical tunnel. It serves as a refuge for queen and brood when nests are visited or inhabited by myrmecophiles or predators. Queens of B. conops have a characteristic phragmotic head that together with the anterior slope of pronotum forms a frontal disk whose shape and dimensions fit the subsidiary chamber entrance and is used by the queen to block that entrance. The foragers patrol a roughly circular area around the nest opening, where they collect live and dead arthropods (mainly other ants) to feed their larvae. In the bottom area of the nest, prey is dismembered, chewed and fed to larvae via trophallaxis. The discarded remains are arranged in a ring around the nest opening and workers concealed in the nest entrance ambush arthropods, including other ants, attracted by the carcasses ring.

The other known species of Blepharidatta have different nesting habits: their smaller colonies (mean number of workers varying from 112 to 132) are found within the leaf-litter, in natural cavities between leaves or in rotting branches. Contrary to B. conops, the queens of B. brasiliensis and Blepharidatta "sp-ba" do not have a phragmotic head.

Colonies of B. conops occur in locally dense but widely scattered populations, with large areas of Cerrado devoided of B. conops. According to Brandão et al. (2001), this distribution pattern may be explained by the limited dispersal mode of ergatoid queens and by the type of nest foundation (fission of established colonies). Such nest distribution may be characteristic of all Blepharidatta species and probably explains why ant species of this genus are considered rare.

== Morphology ==
Blepharidatta sp. queens are ergatoid and have an enlarged phragmotic head that, together with the anterior slope of the pronotum, form a nearly circular disk whose mean maximum transverse diameter is 1.68 mm. Frontal disk cuticle is discretely reticulate-punctate, nearly smooth; head margin is strongly curved upwards, and stiff hairs protrude laterally from the perimeter of the disk. Total mean body length of queens is 4.96 mm. Blepharidatta sp. workers are monomorphic (mean body length: 3.79 mm), and their mean maximum head width is 0.96 mm.
