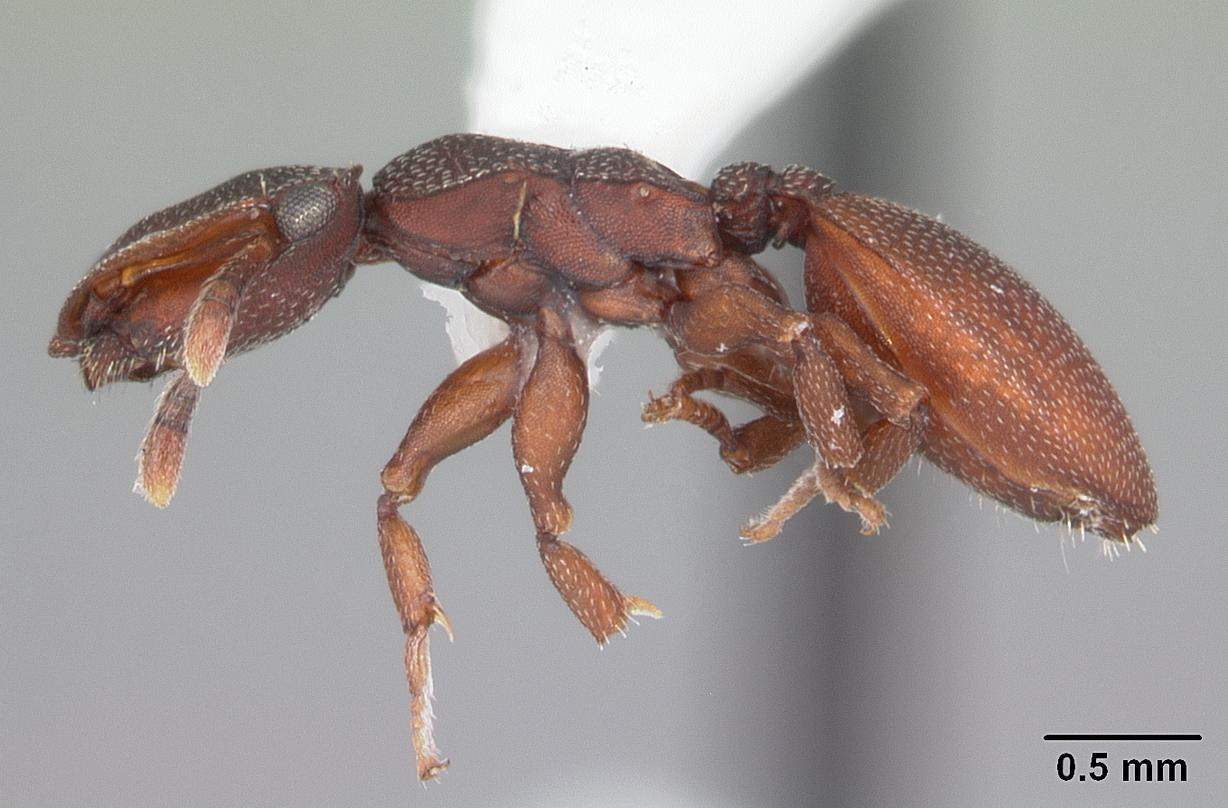

Scientific classification
- Domain: Eukaryota
- Kingdom: Animalia
- Phylum: Arthropoda
- Class: Insecta
- Order: Hymenoptera
- Family: Formicidae
- Subfamily: Myrmicinae
- Genus: Cephalotes
- Species: C. varians

Binomial name
- Cephalotes varians (Smith, 1876)

= Cephalotes varians =

Species of ant

Cephalotes varians is a species of arboreal ant of the genus Cephalotes with the common name turtle ant. Characterized by an odd, shaped head that allows them to block the nest entrance holes and prevents enemies from gaining access to their nest, their ability to "parachute" by steering their fall if they drop off of the tree they are on also makes them one of several species known as gliding ants. When disturbed, they tuck their antennae and legs beneath flanges on their head and body, crouch down, and freeze, thus passively resisting attacks.

In 2016, C. varians was included on a list of adventive ants established in North America.
