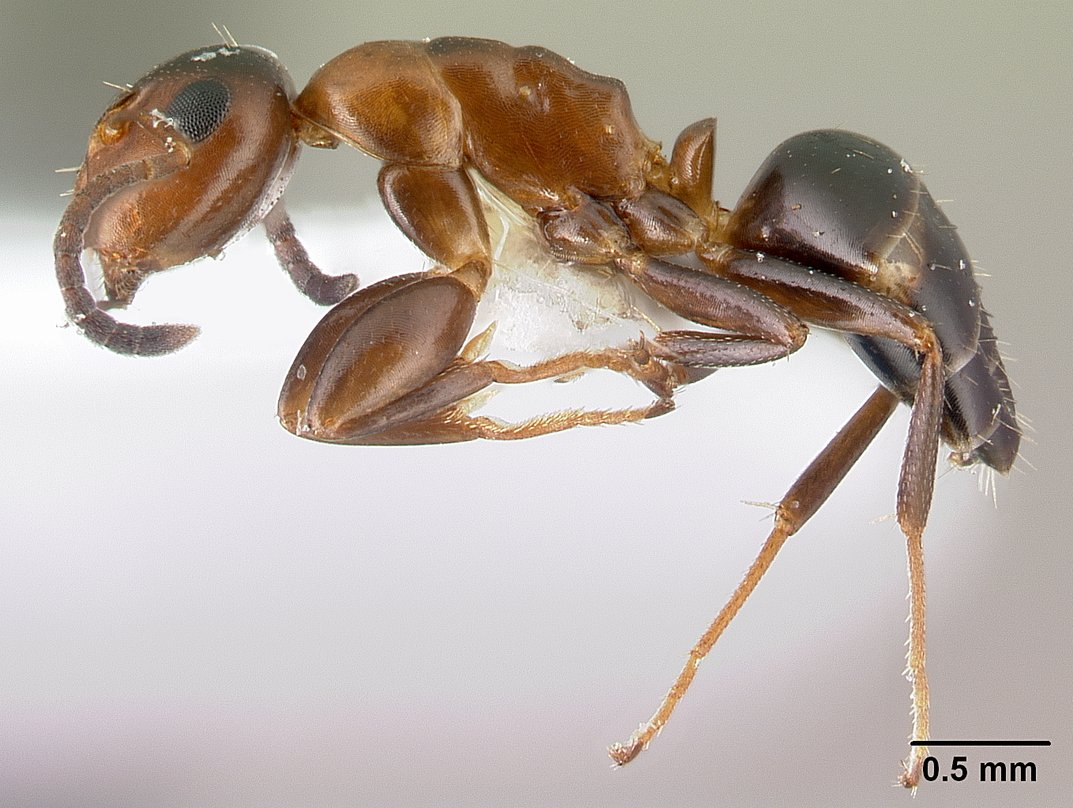
- Type species Colobopsis truncata worker

Scientific classification
- Kingdom: Animalia
- Phylum: Arthropoda
- Clade: Pancrustacea
- Class: Insecta
- Order: Hymenoptera
- Family: Formicidae
- Subfamily: Formicinae
- Tribe: Camponotini
- Genus: Colobopsis; Mayr, 1861

Type species
- Formica truncata Spinola, 1808

Diversity
- 95 species

= Colobopsis =

Genus of ant

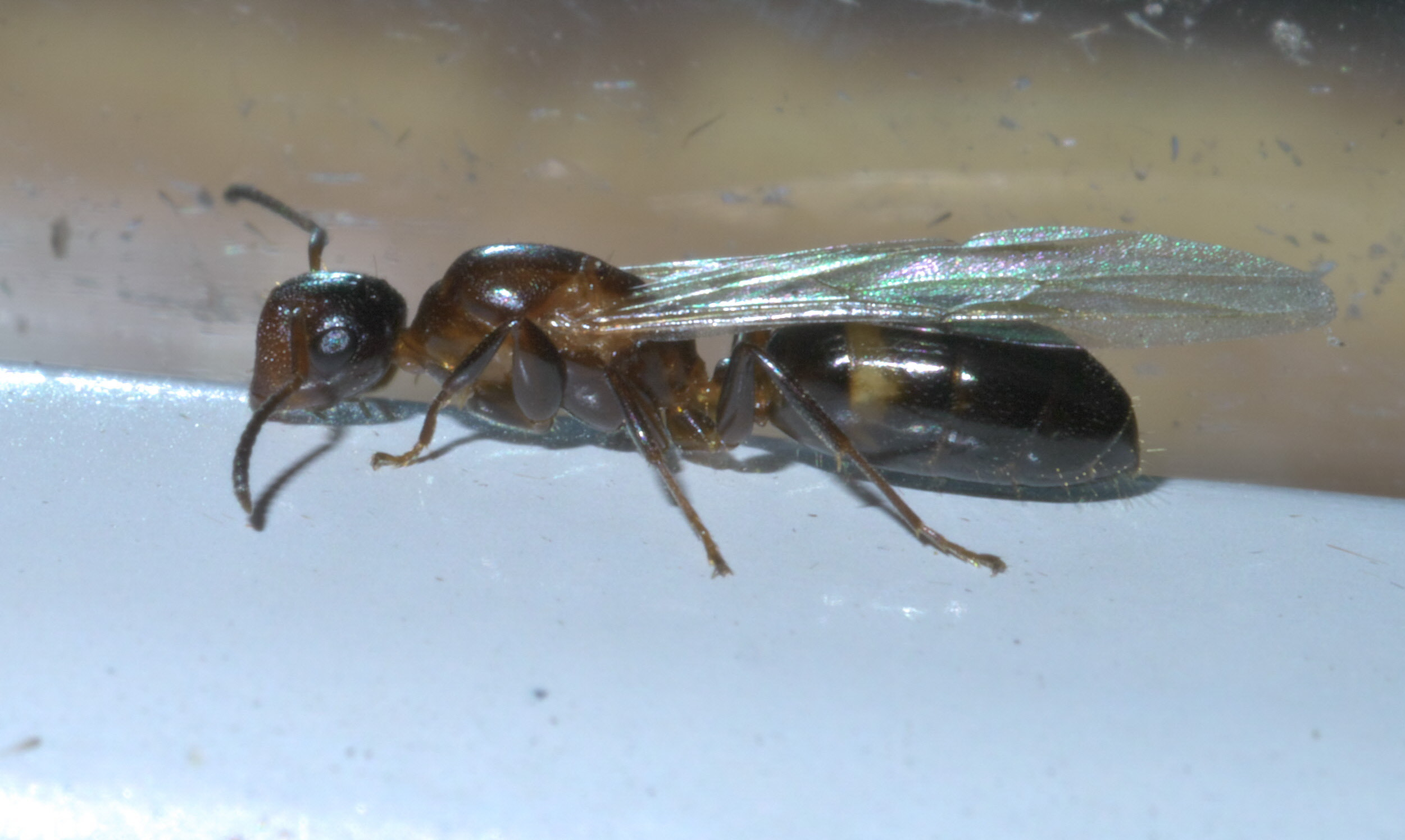
Colobopsis mississippiensis alate

Colobopsis is a genus of ants in the subfamily Formicinae. This genus was first described in 1861 by Mayr and contains 95 species. The type species is Colobopsis truncata.

== Description ==
As part of Camponotini, Colobopsis workers have distinctive mandibular dentition (5-8 teeth with the 3rd tooth from the apex not being reduced), antennae 12-segmented and antennal separations well separated from the posterior clypeal margin.

Colobopsis workers are dimorphic, being divided into major workers and minor workers. The major workers generally have phragmotic heads that are truncate to varying extents. This may cause them to be confused for Camponotus and vice versa, since some Camponotus also have phragmotic heads. Queens of Colobopsis have phragmotic heads as well.

Workers in the Colobopsis cylindrica group have greatly developed mandibular glands that extend from the head all the way to the end of the gaster.

Pupae of Colobopsis are always naked. This is unlike pupae of Camponotus, which are enclosed in cocoons.

== Biology ==
Colobopsis make their nests in plant material such as wood, galls and dead branches. The entrances to these nests are as wide as the truncate heads of major workers and queens. This allows a major worker or queen to plug an entrance using her head (phragmosis). To allow nestmates to pass, the soldier/queen moves back into the nest tunnel, which widens immediately past the entrance.

Workers in the Colobopsis cylindrica group (including Colobopsis explodens and Colobopsis saundersi) have the ability to burst the gaster, releasing mandibular gland compounds from the head (autothysis). For this, they are known as "exploding ants". This is used against competitors and predators, and is fatal to the worker itself but benefits the colony.

== Phylogeny ==
For a period of time, Colobopsis was considered a subgenus of Camponotus. A 2015 phylogenomic study found it to be the sister group to all the remaining Camponotini. Consequently, Colobopsis has been treated as its own genus again.

== Species ==
Selected species:

- Colobopsis anderseni
- Colobopsis explodens
- Colobopsis imitans
- Colobopsis saundersi
- Colobopsis schmitzi
- Colobopsis truncata
