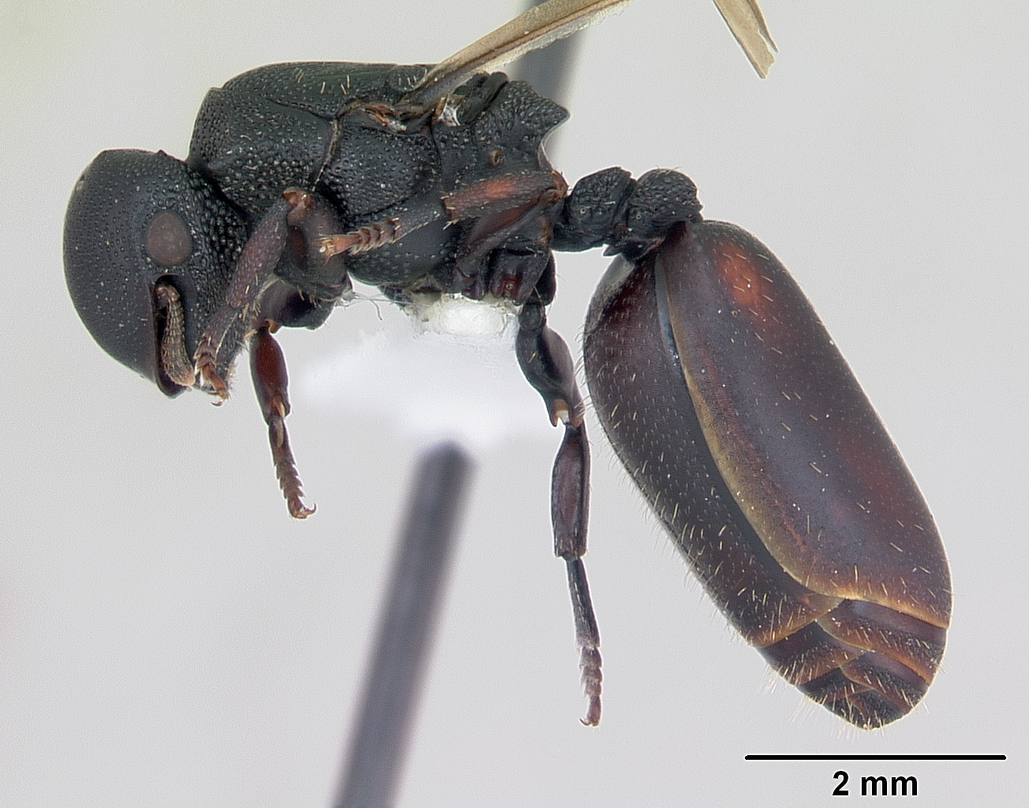

Scientific classification
- Domain: Eukaryota
- Kingdom: Animalia
- Phylum: Arthropoda
- Class: Insecta
- Order: Hymenoptera
- Family: Formicidae
- Subfamily: Myrmicinae
- Genus: Cephalotes
- Species: C. pusillus

Binomial name
- Cephalotes pusillus (Klug, 1824)

= Cephalotes pusillus =

Species of ant

Cephalotes pusillus is a species of arboreal ant in the genus Cephalotes, described in 1824 and characterized by its oddly shaped head and ability to glide if it falls from a tree, as gliding ants do.
