= Opitutaceae =

Scientific classification
- Domain: Bacteria
- Kingdom: Pseudomonadati
- Phylum: Verrucomicrobiota
- Class: Opitutia
- Order: Opitutales
- Family: Opitutaceae; Choo et al. 2007

Genera
- See text

Family of bacteria

The Opitutaceae are a Gram-negative and chemoheterotrophic order of the domain Bacteria. Opitutaceae bacteria were isolated from soil and coastal marine springs.

== Phylogeny ==
The currently accepted taxonomy is based on the List of Prokaryotic names with Standing in Nomenclature (LPSN) and National Center for Biotechnology Information (NCBI).

16S rRNA based LTP_10_2024

- - Oleiharenicola Rochman et al. 2018
  - - - Ereboglobus
      - Nibricoccus
    - - Cephaloticoccus
      - - Horticoccus
        - - Opitutus
          - - Geminisphaera
            - Rariglobus

120 marker proteins based GTDB 10-RS226

- - - "Ca. Pelagisphaera" Bar-Shalom et al. 2023
    - Pelagicoccus Yoon et al. 2007
  - - - "Ca. Didemniditutus" corrig. Lopera et al. 2017
      - "Lacunisphaera" Rast et al. 2017
    - - - "Ca. Salsuginivita" Prabhu et al. 2024
        - - Opitutus Chin, Liesack & Janssen 2001
          - - Horticoccus Chung et al. 2023
            - Cephaloticoccus Lin et al. 2016
      - - - Nibricoccus Baek et al. 2019
          - - Ereboglobus Tegtmeier et al. 2018
            - "Termitidicoccus" Mei et al. 2023
        - - Actomonas Zhang et al. 2024 ["Ca. Synoicihabitans" Murray et al. 2021]
          - - Geminisphaera Wertz et al. 2017
            - Rariglobus Pitt et al. 2020
