= Opitutales =

Scientific classification
- Domain: Bacteria
- Kingdom: Pseudomonadati
- Phylum: Verrucomicrobiota
- Class: Opitutia
- Order: Opitutales; Choo et al. 2007

Families
- Intestinicryptomonadaceae; Oceanipulchritudinaceae; Opitutaceae; Pelagicoccaceae

Order of bacteria

The Opitutales is an order of bacteria in the phylum Verrucomicrobiota.

== Phylogeny ==
The currently accepted taxonomy is based on the List of Prokaryotic names with Standing in Nomenclature (LPSN) and National Center for Biotechnology Information (NCBI).

16S rRNA based LTP_10_2024

- Opitutia
  - Opitutales
    Opitutaceae
  - Puniceicoccales
    - Alterococcaceae
    - - Pelagicoccaceae
      - Puniceicoccaceae (incl. Cerasicoccaceae,
        Coraliomargaritaceae, Oceanipulchritudinaceae)

120 marker proteins based GTDB 10-RS226

- Opitutales
  - - Intestinicryptomonadaceae
    - "Spyradosomataceae"
  - - Cerasicoccaceae
    - - - Coraliomargaritaceae
        - Puniceicoccaceae
      - - - "Moanibacteraceae"
          - Oceanipulchritudinaceae
        - Opitutaceae (incl. Pelagicoccaceae)
