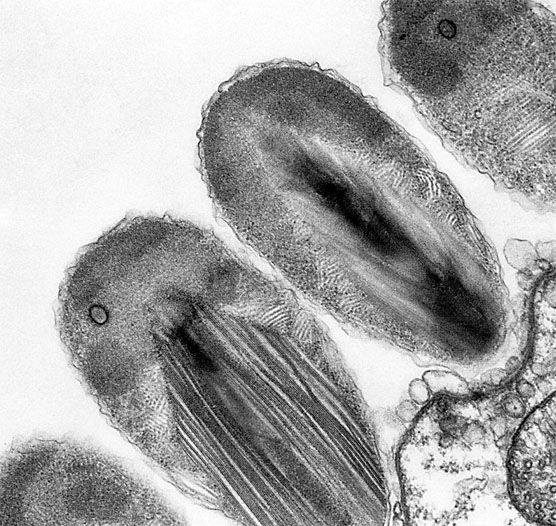
- Transmission electron micrograph of stage II epixenosomes.

Scientific classification
- Domain: Bacteria
- Kingdom: Pseudomonadati
- Superphylum: "PVC"
- Phylum: Verrucomicrobiota; Hedlund 2021

Classes
- Opitutia; Terrimicrobiia; Verrucomicrobiia

Synonyms
- "Verrucomicrobaeota" Oren et al. 2015; Verrucomicrobia Hedlund 2012; "Verrucomicrobiota" Whitman et al. 2018

= Verrucomicrobiota =

Phylum of bacteria

Verrucomicrobiota is a phylum of Gram-negative bacteria that contains only a few described species. The species identified have been isolated from fresh water, marine and soil environments and human faeces. A number of as-yet uncultivated species have been identified in association with eukaryotic hosts including extrusive explosive ectosymbionts of protists and endosymbionts of nematodes from genus Xiphinema, residing in their gametes. The verrucomicrobial bacterium Akkermansia muciniphila is a human intestinal symbiotic bacterium that is considered as a promising probiotic.

Verrucomicrobiota are abundant within the environment, though relatively inactive. This phylum is considered to have two sister phyla: Chlamydiota (formerly Chlamydiae) and Lentisphaerota (formerly Lentisphaerae) within the PVC superphylum. The Verrucomicrobiota phylum can be distinguished from neighbouring phyla within the PVC group by the presence of several conserved signature indels (CSIs). These CSIs represent unique, synapomorphic characteristics that suggest common ancestry within Verrucomicrobiota and an independent lineage amidst other bacteria. CSIs have also been found that are shared by Verrucomicrobiota and Chlamydiota exclusively of all other bacteria. These CSIs provide evidence that Chlamydiota is the closest relative to Verrucomicrobiota, and that they are more closely related to one another than to the Planctomycetales.

Verrucomicrobiota might belong in the clade Planctobacteria in the larger clade Gracilicutes.

In 2008, the whole genome of Methylacidiphilum infernorum (2.3 Mbp) was published. On the single circular chromosome, 2473 predicted proteins were found, 731 of which had no detectable homologs. These analyses also revealed many possible homologies with Pseudomonadota.

== Phylogeny ==
16S rRNA based LTP_10_2024

- - - Kiritimatiellota
      - Kiritimatiellae
        - Kiritimatiellales
          - Kiritimatiellaceae
          - - Tichowtungiaceae
            - Pontiellaceae
    - Lentisphaerota
      - Lentisphaeria
        - Lentisphaerales
          Lentisphaeraceae
      - Oligosphaeria
        - Oligosphaerales
          Oligosphaeraceae
        - Victivallales
          Victivallaceae
  - - Verrucomicrobiota
      - Opitutia
        - Opitutales
          Opitutaceae
        - Puniceicoccales
          - Alterococcaceae
          - - Pelagicoccaceae
            - Puniceicoccaceae (incl. Cerasicoccaceae, Coraliomargaritaceae, Oceanipulchritudinaceae)
      - Verrucomicrobiia
        - - Limisphaerales
            - Fontisphaeraceae
            - Limisphaeraceae
        - - - Methylacidiphilales
              Methylacidiphilaceae
          - - Terrimicrobiales
              Terrimicrobiaceae
            - Verrucomicrobiales
              - Verrucomicrobiaceae
              - Akkermansiaceae (incl. Rubritaleaceae)

120 marker proteins based GTDB 10-RS226

- Verrucomicrobiota
  - - Lentisphaeria
      - - Victivallales
          Victivallaceae
      - - Oligosphaerales
          Oligosphaeraceae
        - Lentisphaerales
          Lentisphaeraceae
  - - Kiritimatiellia
      - "Spyradenecales"
        "Spyradenecaceae"
      - Kiritimatiellales
        - Kiritimatiellaceae
        - - Tichowtungiaceae
          - Pontiellaceae
    - Verrucomicrobiia
      - - Opitutales
          - - Intestinicryptomonadaceae
            - "Spyradosomataceae"
          - - Cerasicoccaceae
            - - - Coraliomargaritaceae
                - Puniceicoccaceae
              - - - "Moanibacteraceae"
                  - Oceanipulchritudinaceae
                - Opitutaceae (incl. Pelagicoccaceae)
      - - - Limisphaerales
            - "Pedosphaeraceae"
            - - Fontisphaeraceae
              - Limisphaeraceae
        - - - Methylacidiphilales
              Methylacidiphilaceae
          - - Terrimicrobiales
              - - "Chthoniobacteraceae"
                - "Udaeobacteraceae"
              - - Terrimicrobiaceae
                - "Xiphinematobacteraceae"
            - Verrucomicrobiales
              - Verrucomicrobiaceae
              - - SLCJ01
                - Akkermansiaceae (incl. Rubritaleaceae)

== Taxonomy ==
The currently accepted taxonomy is based on the List of Prokaryotic names with Standing in Nomenclature (LPSN) and National Center for Biotechnology Information (NCBI).

- Genus ?"Ca. Epixenosoma" Bauer et al. 2005
- Genus ?"Ca. Nucleicoccus" corrig. Sato et al. 2014
- Genus ?"Ca. Organicella" Williams et al. 2021
- Genus ?"Ca. Rhizospheria" Nunes da Rocha 2010
- Class Opitutia corrig. Choo et al. 2007
  - Order Opitutales Choo et al. 2007
    - Family Alterococcaceae Min et al. 2023
    - Family Cerasicoccaceae Min et al. 2023
    - Family Coraliomargaritaceae Min et al. 20232
    - Family Intestinicryptomonadaceae corrig. Hitch et al. 2025 ["Merdousiaceae" Pallen, Rodriguez-R & Alikhan 2022]
    - Family "Moanibacteraceae" Pallen, Rodriguez-R & Alikhan 2022 [UBA2987]
    - Family Oceanipulchritudinaceae Min et al. 2023
    - Family Opitutaceae Choo et al. 2007
    - Family Pelagicoccaceae Min et al. 2023
    - Family Puniceicoccaceae Choo et al. 2007
    - Family "Seribacteraceae" Wilkie & Olrellana 2024 ["Fogupanaceae" Pallen, Rodriguez-R & Alikhan 2022]
    - Family "Spyradosomataceae" Pallen, Rodriguez-R & Alikhan 2022 [UBA953]
- Class Verrucomicrobiia corrig. Hedlund, Gosink & Staley 1998 ["Methylacidiphilae"; "Pedosphaerae" Brewer et al. 2016; Terrimicrobiia corrig. García-López et al. 2020]
  - Order Limisphaerales Podosokorskaya et al. 2023 ["Pedosphaerales"]
    - Family Fontisphaeraceae Podosokorskaya et al. 2023
    - Family Limisphaeraceae Podosokorskaya et al. 2023
    - Family "Pedosphaeraceae" ?Tsitko et al. 2014
  - Order Methylacidiphilales Awala et al. 2023
    - Family Methylacidiphilaceae Awala et al. 2023
  - Order Terrimicrobiales García-López et al. 2020 ["Chthoniobacterales" Sangwan et al. 2004]
    - Family "Chthoniobacteraceae" Sangwan et al. 2004
    - Family Terrimicrobiaceae García-López et al. 2020
    - Family "Udaeobacteraceae" Pallen, Rodriguez-R & Alikhan 2022 [UBA10450]
    - Family "Xiphinematobacteraceae"
  - Order Verrucomicrobiales Ward-Rainey et al. 1996
    - Family Akkermansiaceae Hedlund & Derrien 2012 [Rubritaleaceae Hedlund 2012]
    - Family "Sulfuriroseicoccus" Feng et al. 2022 {SLCJ01}
    - Family Verrucomicrobiaceae Ward-Rainey et al. 1996

== See also ==
- List of bacterial orders
- List of bacteria genera
