= List of colossal squid specimens and sightings =

Colossal squid sighted near the Ross Ice Shelf on 8 January 2007 (#18 on this list). The animal is seen here with its limbs wrapped around a Patagonian toothfish caught on a longline. Note the orange-red skin and the single arm extended above the water's surface, displaying the hooked medial suckers that are the source of the generic name Mesonychoteuthis (meso- = middle, onycho- = nail, claw).

This list of colossal squid specimens and sightings is a timeline of recorded human encounters with members of the genus Mesonychoteuthis, popularly known as colossal squid. It includes animals that were caught by fishermen, recovered (in whole or in part) from sperm whales and other predatory species, as well as those credibly sighted at sea. The list also covers specimens misidentified as colossal squid.

== Background ==
Published coordinates of colossal squid specimens (may be subject to significant rounding error) Download coordinates as: KML

The colossal squid (Mesonychoteuthis hamiltoni), which has a circum-Antarctic distribution in the Southern Ocean, is far less known than the distantly related, near-cosmopolitan giant squid (Architeuthis dux). Though a substantial number of colossal squid specimens have been recorded, the vast majority of these are only fragmentary remains such as disarticulated beaks. Xavier et al. (1999) collated 188 geographical positions for whole or partial specimens caught by commercial and scientific fisheries, but very few mature animals have ever been documented. O'Shea & Bolstad (2008) found 11 reports in which adult or subadult specimens had been described, and mentioned that at least 7 additional, "similarly sized" specimens were known to them; McClain et al. (2015) stated that only 12 "complete" specimens were known.

Colossal squid caught off South Georgia Island on 25 June 2005 (#17), possibly the first to be filmed alive. Note the uniformly dark skin pigmentation in contrast to the 2008 specimen.

=== Early specimens ===
The earliest known specimens of this species are two brachial crowns (#1) recovered from the stomach of a sperm whale in the winter of 1924–1925, on the basis of which Guy Coburn Robson formally described Mesonychoteuthis hamiltoni in 1925. Apart from two partial specimens (#2 and 3) recovered from sperm whale stomachs in the mid-1950s—initially misidentified as belonging to the giant squid genus, Architeuthis—and a single juvenile individual of 86 mm (3.4 in) mantle length (#4), little else was known about the species until additional specimens began receiving coverage in Russian-language scientific journals in the 1970s. In 1981, a Soviet trawler operating off Dronning Maud Land, Antarctica, retrieved a complete specimen (#9) with a mantle length of 2.42 m (7.9 ft) and total length of 5.1 m (17 ft) from a depth of 750–770 m, which was later identified as an immature female of M. hamiltoni.

=== Emergence from obscurity ===
It would be more than two decades before another giant individual was collected: in March 2003, a complete specimen of a subadult female (#14) was found near the surface in the Ross Sea. It weighed some 300 kg (660 lb), with a total length of around 5.4 m (18 ft) and mantle length of 2.5 m (8.2 ft). It was this specimen that led teuthologist Steve O'Shea to coin the common name "colossal squid". A much smaller immature female (#15) was taken by trawl at 1,143 m (3,750 ft) depth off Macquarie Island the same year. On 25 June 2005, a specimen was captured alive at a depth of 1,625 m (5,331 ft) while taking Patagonian toothfish from a longline in South Georgian waters (#17). Although the heavy mantle could not be brought aboard, the total length was estimated at 5 m (16 ft) and the animal is thought to have weighed between 150 and 200 kg (330 and 440 lb). It was filmed alive at the surface.

=== Largest known specimen ===
The giant specimen filmed at the surface in the D'Urville Sea in January 2008 (#21). Note the greatly distended mantle and oversized fins. The animal turned maroon upon being pulled to the surface, but soon returned to the pale pink seen here. It has been suggested that this might be the animal's typical colouration, with the more commonly seen reddish tones representing a stress response. (Note: Similar near-white colouration was seen in the first habitat footage of both the giant squid and Kondakovia longimana (giant warty squid), much to the surprise of experts, as dead or dying specimens of these species likewise have reddish skin.)

The largest known complete specimen of the colossal squid—and the heaviest recorded extant cephalopod—was a mature female (#19) captured in the Ross Sea in February 2007. Its weight was initially estimated at 450 kg (990 lb), its mantle length at 4 m (13 ft), and its total length at 8–10 m (26–33 ft). Once completely thawed the specimen was found to weigh 495 kg (1,091 lb), but to measure only 2.5 m (8.2 ft) in mantle length and 4.2 m (14 ft) in total length. (Note: The fins of the 2007 Ross Sea specimen measured around 1.2 m (3.9 ft) across and it had a mantle width of 98.2 cm (3.22 ft). The arms ranged in length from 0.85 m (2.8 ft) to 1.15 m (3.8 ft), while the two tentacles were around 2.1 m (6.9 ft) long.) It is likely that the specimen, and particularly its tentacles, shrank considerably post mortem as a result of dehydration, having been kept in a freezer for 14 months. (Note: As reported by the Museum of New Zealand Te Papa Tongarewa, specimens of Nototodarus sloanii, the New Zealand arrow squid, can shrink by as much as 22% when dehydrated with alcohol solutions. The colossal squid specimen contracted by a further 5% after several years in preservative fluid (first formalin and later propylene glycol).) Both this and the 2003 specimen received significant media attention and did much to bring the species to public prominence; the following years saw a number of individuals of the more commonly encountered giant squid misidentified as colossal squid (e.g. #[1] and [2]).

=== Later developments ===
Perhaps the best video of a live colossal squid is that of an animal (#21) recorded at the surface in the D'Urville Sea off Antarctica in January 2008. The squid was pulled to the surface feeding on a line-caught toothfish. The video is likely the first to show a colossal squid swimming freely, and records the animal performing a slow roll on its longitudinal axis. Initially light-coloured, the squid quickly turned blood red (possibly a stress response) before returning to a light pink after lingering at the surface for a short time, thence slowly retreated to deeper water.

Another giant specimen, a female measuring 3.5 m (11 ft) in total length and weighing 350 kg (770 lb), was recovered intact in 2014 (#27). It had eyes 37 cm (15 in) across—the largest ever recorded. Its 3.5-hour dissection at the Museum of New Zealand Te Papa Tongarewa was live streamed on YouTube. Since then, several more colossal squid have been filmed or photographed alive at the surface.

In 2025, the first confirmed sighting of a (juvenile) colossal squid in its natural environment was recorded, with hook arrangement confirming that it was in fact a colossal squid instead of another cranchiid. As far as is publicly known, the colossal squid had never been observed alive in its natural, deep-water habitat before then, although a number of such recordings of the giant squid have been made in recent years. As such, it was the only known extant species of truly giant (>50 kg [110 lb]) cephalopod that had never been filmed in its natural habitat. (Note: In descending order of confirmed maximum size: Architeuthis dux (giant squid) was first photographed alive in its natural habitat in 2004, and filmed therein in 2012, 2017, and 2019; Taningia danae (Dana octopus squid) was filmed in 2005 and again in 2012; Onykia robusta (robust clubhook squid) was filmed alive in shallow water in 1993 or earlier; Dosidicus gigas (Humboldt squid) is commonly encountered and filmed; and live habitat footage of Kondakovia longimana (giant warty squid) was released in 2017. Among octopuses, Enteroctopus dofleini (giant Pacific octopus) is commonly encountered and filmed, and the deep-sea Haliphron atlanticus (seven-arm octopus) has been recorded from submersibles on a number of occasions.)

== List of colossal squid ==
Records are listed chronologically in ascending order and numbered accordingly. This numbering is not meant to be definitive but rather to provide a convenient means of referring to individual records. Specimens incorrectly identified as colossal squid are counted separately, their numbers enclosed in square brackets, and are highlighted in pink ( ). Records that cover multiple colossal squid specimens, or remains of more than a single animal (e.g. two lower beaks), have the 'Material cited' cell highlighted in grey ( ). Animals that were photographed or filmed while alive are highlighted in yellow ( ). Where a record falls into more than one of these categories, a combination of shadings is used. Where an image of a specimen is available this is indicated by a camera symbol (📷) that links to the image.

- **Date** – Date on which the specimen was first captured, found, or observed. Where this is unknown, the date on which the specimen was first reported is listed instead and noted as such. All times are local.
- **Location** – Site where the specimen was found, including coordinates and depth information where available. Given as it appears in the cited reference(s), except where additional information is provided in square brackets. The quadrant of a major ocean in which the specimen was found is given in curly brackets (e.g. {SEA}; see Oceanic sectors).
- **Nature of encounter** – Circumstances in which the specimen was recovered or observed. Given as they appear in the cited reference(s).
- **Identification** – Species- or genus-level taxon to which the specimen was assigned. Given as it appears in the cited reference(s). Listed chronologically if specimen was re-identified. Where only a vernacular name has been applied to the specimen (e.g. "colossal squid" or a non-English equivalent), this is given instead.

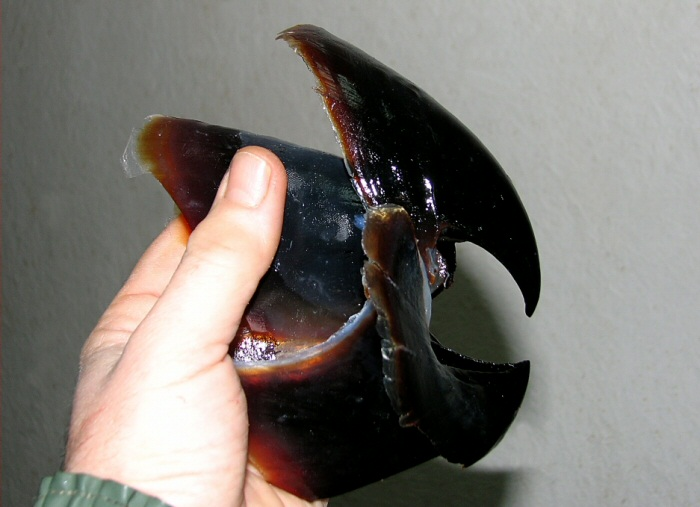
Beak of a colossal squid from the Amundsen Sea off Antarctica. Being more-or-less indigestible, beaks are often the only identifiable colossal squid remains found in the stomachs of predatory species such as sperm whales. The colossal squid has the largest beak among living cephalopods, with a lower rostral length around twice that of the giant squid.

- **Material cited** – Original specimen material that was recovered or observed. "Entire" encompasses all more-or-less complete specimens. Names of anatomical features are retained from original sources (e.g. "jaws" may be given instead of the preferred "beak", or "body" instead of "mantle"). The specimen's state of preservation is also given, where known, and any missing parts enumerated.
- **Material saved** – Material that was kept after examination and not discarded (if any). Information may be derived from outdated sources and therefore not current; the material may no longer be extant.
- **Sex** – Sex and sexual maturity of the specimen.
- **Size and measurements** – Data relating to measurements and counts. Abbreviations used are based on standardised acronyms in teuthology (see Measurements), with the exception of several found in older references. Measurements are given as they appear in the cited reference(s), with both arithmetic precision and original units preserved (though metric conversions are shown alongside imperial measurements).
- **Repository** – Institution in which the specimen material is deposited (based on cited sources; may not be current), including accession numbers where available. Institutional acronyms are those defined by Leviton et al. (1985) and Leviton & Gibbs (1988) (see Repositories). Where the acronym is unknown, the full repository name is listed. Type specimens, such as holotypes or syntypes, are identified as such in boldface.
- **Main references** – The most important sources, typically ones that provide extensive data on a particular specimen (often primary sources). Presented in author–date parenthetical referencing style, with page numbers included where applicable (page numbers in square brackets refer either to unpaginated works or English translations of originally non-English works; see Full citations). Figures ("figs.") and plates ("pls.") are also indicated where present.
- **Additional references** – Less important references that merely refer to the specimen without imparting substantive additional information (see Full citations), except where such are the only available sources, in which case they are listed under 'Main references'. Includes possibly unobtainable sources such as old newspaper articles and television broadcasts.
- Notes – Miscellaneous information, often including individuals and vessels involved in the specimen's recovery and subsequent treatment, and any dissections, preservation work or scientific analyses carried out on the specimen. Where animals have been recorded while alive this is also noted. Material not referable to the genus Mesonychoteuthis, as well as specimens on public display, are both highlighted in bold (as "Non-mesonychoteuthid" and "On public display", respectively), though the latter information may no longer be current.

#	Date	Location	Nature of encounter	Identification	Material cited	Material saved	Sex	Size and measurements	Repository	Main references	Additional references	Notes
1	winter of 1924–1925	50 mi (80 km) north of Smith Island, South Shetland	From sperm whale stomach	Mesonychoteuthis hamiltoni Robson, 1925	Two arm (brachial) crowns	Entire			BMNH 1926.3.31.28; **syntypes** of Mesonychoteuthis hamiltoni Robson, 1925	Robson (1925:272, figs. 1–2); Lipiński et al. (2000:107)	Sweeney & Young (2003); O'Shea & Bolstad (2008); Sweeney (2017:[31])	
2	1956/1957	South Orkney Islands (59°41′S 44°14′W) {SWA}	From sperm whale stomach	Architeuthis sp.; Mesonychoteuthis hamiltoni Robson, 1925	Head and mantle	Undetermined		HL: 30 cm; HW: 20 cm; ED: 16–17 cm; ?WL: ~12 m		Korabelnikov (1959:103); Yukhov (1974:62)	Sweeney & Roper (2001:[56])	Initial identification by I.I. Akimushkin. From 15.8 m long male sperm whale.
3	1956/1957	South Shetland Islands (61°56′S 52°39′W) {SWA}	From sperm whale stomach	Architeuthis sp.; Mesonychoteuthis hamiltoni Robson, 1925	Fin only	Undetermined		FL: 41 cm; FW: 48 cm; ?WL: ~10 m		Korabelnikov (1959:103); Yukhov (1974:62)	Sweeney & Roper (2001:[56])	Initial identification by I.I. Akimushkin. From 15 m long male sperm whale.
4	1970 (reported)			Mesonychoteuthis hamiltoni	Entire	Entire?	(juvenile)	ML: 86 mm		McSweeny (1970); Voss (1980:395, figs. 10b,d)	Clarke (1986:199); O'Shea & Bolstad (2008); Young & Mangold (2019, 2 figs.)	Juvenile specimen. Upper and lower beaks described and illustrated.
5	1975 (reported)			Mesonychoteuthis hamiltoni				"large specimen"; ML unknown		Klumov & Yukhov (1975)	Clarke (1986:199)	Upper and lower beaks described and illustrated.
6	1980 (reported)		From sperm whale stomach	Mesonychoteuthis hamiltoni	Entire; "nearly complete", inner organs missing	Entire?	Female (subadult)	ML: 125 cm		Voss (1980:394, fig. 10a)	O'Shea & Bolstad (2008); Young & Mangold (2019, fig.)	
7	1980 (reported)			Mesonychoteuthis hamiltoni	Entire	Entire?	(larva)	ML: 23 mm		Voss (1980:395, fig. 10c)	Young & Mangold (2019, fig.)	Advanced paralarva.
8	1980 (reported)		From sperm whale stomach(s)	Mesonychoteuthis hamiltoni	Several partial specimens	Entire		"large"	NMNH	Voss (1980:394)	O'Shea & Bolstad (2008)	One specimen a mature male. Brachial crowns according to O'Shea & Bolstad (2008).
9 (📷)	March 1981	Lazarev Sea, off Dronning Maud Land, Antarctic at 750–770 m depth	By trawl	Mesonychoteuthis hamiltoni	Entire		Female (immature)	ML: 2.42 m; EL: 5.1 m		Remeslo (2011); Remeslo (2014, figs. 1–4)	Ellis (1998:147, fig.)	Caught by Soviet trawler Eureka (Эврика). Photographed on deck by Alexander Remeslo.
	1982 (reported)	Not given	Not given	Mesonychoteuthis	Not given	Transverse slice of gladius		ML: "at least" 5 m [estimate]		Wood (1982:191)	Bright (1989:146)	Wood (1982:191) provided the following details: "Dr Anna M Bidder (pers. comm.) of the Department of Zoology at Cambridge University, possesses a transverse slice of the pen of another Mesonychoteuthis which, judging by its width, must have come from a cranchid [sic] measuring at least 5 m [16 ft] in mantle length." The same information is summarised by Bright (1989:146).
10	1985 (reported)	at 2000–2200 m depth	Trawled in opening-closing net (RMT8)	Mesonychoteuthis hamiltoni	Entire?			ML: 1.05 m		Rodhouse & Clarke (1985)	O'Shea & Bolstad (2008)	
11	1986 (reported)	(47°51′S 40°01′W, WH 101 I/76)		Mesonychoteuthis hamiltoni	Lower beak	Entire?	Female (juvenile)	LRL: 7.10 mm; ML: 225.0 mm		Clarke (1986:200, fig. A)		
12	1986 (reported)	S. Georgia	From sperm whale stomach	Mesonychoteuthis hamiltoni	Lower beak	Entire?		LRL: 13.50 mm		Clarke (1986:200, fig. B)		
13	1986 (reported)	S. Georgia	From sperm whale stomach	Mesonychoteuthis hamiltoni	Lower beak	Entire?		LRL: 20.40 mm		Clarke (1986:200, fig. C)		
14 (📷)	March 2003	Ross Sea	Found floating at surface, dead	Mesonychoteuthis hamiltoni	Entire; recovered in three pieces, later reassembled	Entire	Female (subadult)	ML: ~2.5 m; WL: ~5.4 m; LRL: 37/38 mm; WT: ~300 kg	NMNZ	Griggs (2003); Owen (2003); Hoff (2003:86); O'Shea & Bolstad (2008)	Numerous media sources; Remeslo (2011); Remeslo (2014); McClain et al. (2015); Young & Mangold (2019, fig.)	Examined at the Museum of New Zealand Te Papa Tongarewa by Steve O'Shea and Kat Bolstad, which led them to coin the name "colossal squid" for the species.
15 (📷)	2003	between Macquarie Island and Stewart Island, ~140 nmi (260 km) south of New Zealand waters (53°49.30′S 159°04.44′E), at 1143 m depth {SWP}	By trawl	Mesonychoteuthis hamiltoni	Entire	Entire	Female (immature)	ML: 0.9 m [when fresh]		Young (2003b); Wassilieff & O'Shea (2006); O'Shea & Bolstad (2008); [SeaPics] (N.d.)		Examined by Steve O'Shea (see also medial arm suckers).
16	2004 (reported)	"in upper slope waters of the Kerguelen Archipelago"	From stomach contents of 22 sleeper sharks (Somniosus pacificus)	Mesonychoteuthis hamiltoni	89 beaks; 42 lower, 47 upper (minimum number of individuals: 49)	Entire		LRL: 10.1–38.8 mm; LRL: 22.3 mm ±7.2 [average]; ML: 61–237 cm [estimate]; ML: 136 cm ±44 [average]; WT: 2.1–91.2 kg [estimate]; WT: 24.4 kg ±22.1 [average]		Cherel & Duhamel (2004)		M. hamiltoni beaks were found in 61.1% (22/36) of sleeper sharks examined. Beaks of this species accounted for 16.1% (89/553) of total recovered cephalopod beaks. M. hamiltoni accounted for 52.0% (1133621/2180535 g) of total reconstituted cephalopod biomass.
17 (📷)	25 June 2005	"South Georgia waters" at 1625 m depth	Caught by long-lining fishing vessel targeting Patagonian toothfish; filmed and photographed alive at surface	Mesonychoteuthis hamiltoni	Entire; alive	Head with tentacles and arms; mantle too heavy to bring aboard		WL: ~5 m [estimate]; WT: 150–200 kg [estimate]		[Anonymous] (2005); O'Shea (2005)		Caught by longliner Isla Santa Clara. Five men, including the ship's scientific observer, attempted to bring the squid aboard. Paul McCarthy, the scientific observer, estimated the length and weight of the squid. Specimen was sent to King Edward Point (KEP) Scientists for formal identification. Filmed at the surface by Ramon Ferreira Gomez; possibly first colossal squid to be filmed alive.
18 (📷)	8 January 2007	near Ross Ice Shelf {SWP}	Caught by long-lining fishing vessel targeting Patagonian toothfish; photographed alive at surface	Mesonychoteuthis hamiltoni	Entire; alive	None?		ML: 12–14 ft (3.7–4.3 m) [estimate?]		[Anonymous] (2007a, 3 figs.); Clem (2007, 3 figs.)		Photographed alive in the water holding onto a Patagonian toothfish.
19 (📷)	"early February" (captured); 22 February 2007 (reported)	Ross Sea {SWP}	Caught while fishing for Antarctic toothfish; filmed and photographed alive at surface	Mesonychoteuthis hamiltoni	Entire; alive	Entire	Female	EL: 10 m [initial estimate]; EL: 4.2 m [after thawing]; ML: ~2.5 m; LRL: 41/42.5 mm; EyD: 30–40 cm [estimate]; EyD: 27 cm [after thawing]; LD: 12 cm; WT: 495 kg	NMNZ	Anderton (2007); [Anonymous] (2007b); Griggs (2007); [Anonymous] (2007c); Black (2008); Atkinson (2008b); extensive official online coverage ([Te Papa], 2008a–v); Mackenzie (2019)	Numerous media sources and website; McClain et al. (2015); Joseph (2016:476, fig. 8.24a); Cleal (2020:[16])	**On public display.** First mature specimen ever recovered and largest extant cephalopod scientifically documented. Caught by New Zealand (Sanford Ltd.) vessel San Aspiring while fishing for Antarctic toothfish. Filmed alive at surface. Placed in cargo net and brought aboard using crane (see video). Weight initially estimated at 450 kg, mantle length at 4 m, and total length at 8–10 m. Tentacles and eyes shrunk considerably post mortem. Thawed and examined by Steve O'Shea, Kat Bolstad, and Tsunemi Kubodera at Museum of New Zealand Te Papa Tongarewa. Featured in Discovery Channel program "Colossal Squid" (see clip). Most popular exhibit at Museum of New Zealand Te Papa Tongarewa. Featured in Whiti: Colossal Squid of the Deep, winner of 2021 Whitley Award for Best Children's Book.
20	28 May 2007 (reported)	New Zealand? {SWP}	From a research cruise	Mesonychoteuthis hamiltoni	Two tentacles			ML: 2 m [estimate]		Bolstad (2007)		
21 (📷)	January 2008	D'Urville Sea, off Antarctica	Filmed alive at surface feeding on toothfish, which it released after being prodded with long pole; changed colour while lingering at surface, before slowly retreating to deeper water	Mesonychoteuthis hamiltoni	Entire	None		Estimates by eye-witness Alexander Vagin, quoted in [Anonymous] (2013): ML: ~4 m; MW: ≥0.5 m; WL: >5 m		[Anonymous] (2013); Garland (2015); Bühler (2015); Millner (2015); Farquhar (2015); Mills (2015); Strege (2015)	Young & Mangold (2019)	Seen alive at surface by Russian scientists (including Ivan Istomin and Alexander Vagin) on South Korean research vessel during mission to study toothfish; filmed by Istomin. Recorded in 2008 but only made public in 2013; widely reported in English-language media only in 2015. Specimen pulled from depths feeding on line-caught toothfish. Video shows squid changing colour from initial deep red (possibly a stress response) to light pink. Widely misreported as "giant squid".
22	20 March 2008 (reported)	Ross Sea {SWP}	Caught by New Zealand research vessel Tangaroa	"colossal squid"	Several specimens		Juvenile			Atkinson (2008a)		
[1]	25 May 2008	about 40 km off Portland, Victoria, Australia, at 556 m depth {SWP}	Caught by trawler Zeehaan	"colossal squid"; "giant squid"	Entire; eyes, skin and fins intact	Entire	Female	EL: >12 m [intact estimate]; ?EL: 5.5–6 m; WT: 245 kg	Melbourne Museum, Museum Victoria	Burgess (2008); [Anonymous] (2008a); [Anonymous] (2008b); McNamara (2008); [Anonymous] (2008c); [Anonymous] (2008d)		**Non-mesonychoteuthid.** Misidentified as a "colossal squid" in some media reports. Reportedly largest recorded giant squid specimen from Australian waters. Capture of squid described by skipper Rangi Pene. Public dissection took place at Melbourne Museum on 17 July 2008, carried out by team of experts led by Mark Norman.
23	2009 (reported)	Kerguelen waters {SIO}	Found in stomach contents of sleeper shark (Somniosus sp.)	Mesonychoteuthis hamiltoni	Lower beak	Entire	(adult)	LRL: 23.6 mm		Xavier & Cherel (2009:55, fig. 10)		
24	2009 (reported)	Kerguelen waters {SIO}	Found in stomach contents of sleeper shark (Somniosus sp.)	Mesonychoteuthis hamiltoni	Lower beak	Entire	(juvenile)	LRL: 10.4 mm		Xavier & Cherel (2009:56, fig. 10)		
25	2009 (reported)	Kerguelen waters {SIO}	Found in stomach contents of sleeper shark (Somniosus sp.)	Mesonychoteuthis hamiltoni	Upper beak	Entire		URL: 27.7 mm		Xavier & Cherel (2009:86, fig. 10)		
[2]	7 August 2010 (morning)	Houghton Bay, Wellington, New Zealand {SWP}	Found washed ashore in stormwater channel, dead	"colossal squid"; "giant squid"	Entire; "in bad shape"	Beak; other remains left to the elements, washed out to sea around 3 pm		?EL: 3.5–4 m [estimate; "small"]	NMNZ	Harvey (2010); [Anonymous] (2010); Pollock (2010)		**Non-mesonychoteuthid.** Initially identified as a colossal squid by Department of Conservation Wellington area manager, Rob Stone. Correct identification by Te Papa communications manager, Jane Kieg. Te Papa only interested in beak for examination due to poor condition of specimen; probably attacked at sea.
26 (📷)	2 April 2012 (reported; found in previous week)	off Portland, Victoria, Australia {SWP}	Found floating at surface, dead	"colossal type [squid]"	Entire?			?ML: ~2 m ["body"]; ?MW: ~1 m; WT: 120 kg		Collins (2012)		Found by local fisherman and boat operator Bob McPherson while fishing for tuna in waters 700 m deep.
27 (📷)	mid-2014	Ross Sea at 1200–1800 m depth {SWP}	Caught by New Zealand (Sanford Ltd.) vessel San Aspiring while fishing for Patagonian toothfish	"colossal squid"	Entire; tentacles missing	Entire	Female	EL: 3.5 m; WT: 350 kg; EyD: 35/37 cm	NMNZ	Bryner (2014); Farquhar (2014); Feltman (2014); extensive official online coverage ([Te Papa], 2014a–f)	Numerous media sources	Dissected on 16 September 2014 (eye lens and buccal mass removed); caught "a couple of months" earlier. Dissection led by Kat Bolstad and carried out by staff of Museum of New Zealand Te Papa Tongarewa with help of Auckland University of Technology (including post-graduate researcher Aaron Boyd Evans). Eggs found in mantle. Dissection live streamed on YouTube for 3.5 hours.
28 (📷)	2015	Ross Sea	Caught	Mesonychoteuthis	Entire; "very good condition"	Entire	(juvenile)	?EL: ~12 cm	NMNZ	[NIWA] (2015); [Anonymous] (2015)		Collected by NIWA during the New Zealand–Australia Antarctic Ecosystems Voyage (29 January – 11 March 2015). Frozen on board ship; later examined at the Museum of New Zealand Te Papa Tongarewa by Kat Bolstad and Aaron Boyd Evans. Characteristic hook and sucker combination already discernible on arms.
29	2025	South Atlantic Ocean, near the South Sandwich Islands	Filmed in its natural environment at a depth of 600 m (2,000 ft).	Mesonychoteuthis hamiltoni	Entire; alive	None	(juvenile)	?EL: 30 cm				Filmed in its natural environment by the Schmidt Ocean Institute's remotely operated vehicle (ROV) SuBastian.

== Abbreviations ==
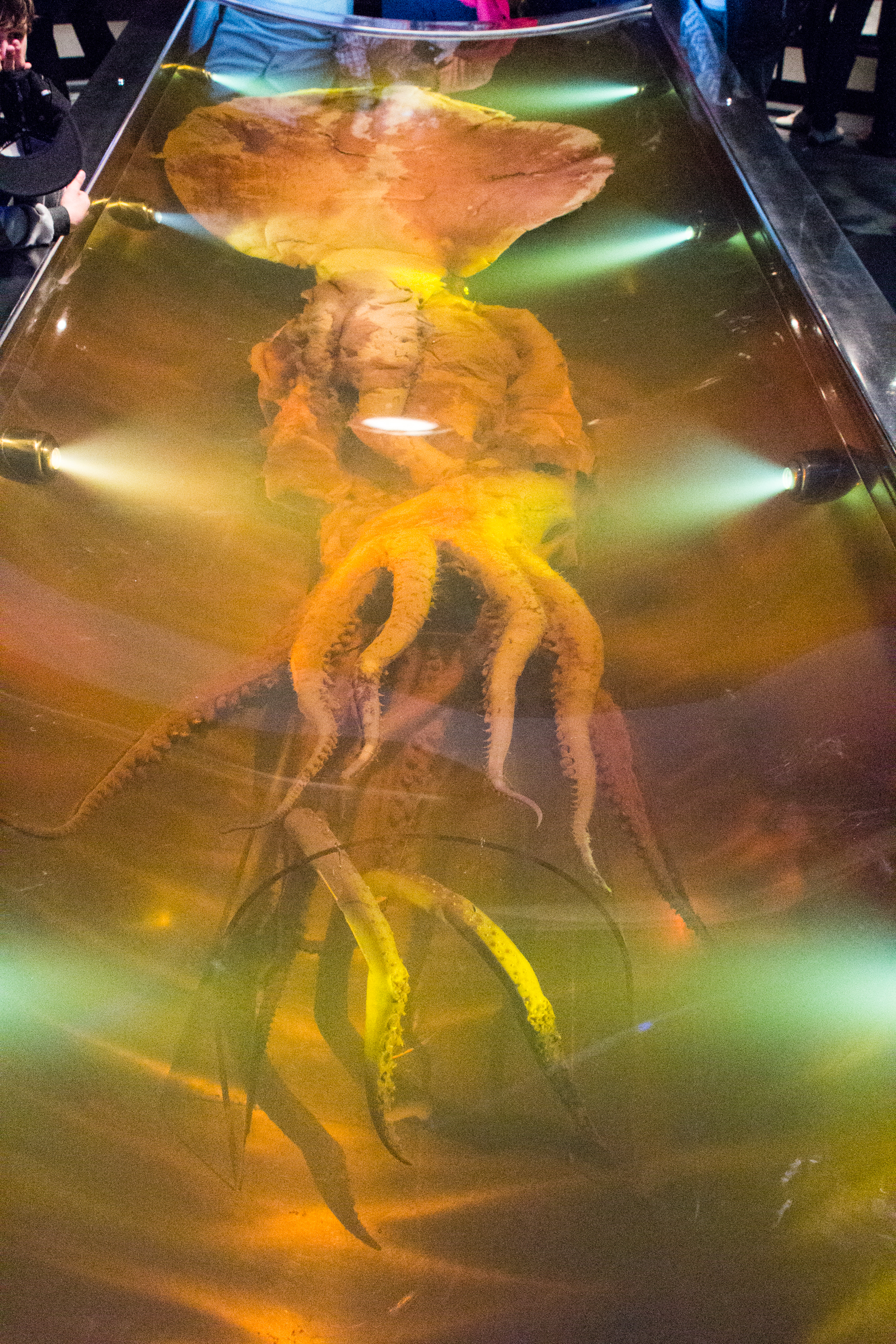
The 495-kilogram (1,091 lb) colossal squid on display at the Museum of New Zealand Te Papa Tongarewa (#19). It is the most massive extant cephalopod on record.

The following abbreviations are used in the List of colossal squid table.

=== Oceanic sectors ===
M. hamiltoni has a circumpolar Antarctic distribution.

- SWA, Southwest Atlantic Ocean
- SEA, Southeast Atlantic Ocean
- SWP, Southwest Pacific Ocean
- SEP, Southeast Pacific Ocean
- SIO, Southern Indian Ocean

=== Measurements ===
Abbreviations used for measurements and counts are based on standardised acronyms in teuthology, primarily those defined by Roper & Voss (1983), with the exception of several found in older references.

- ED, egg diameter
- EL, "entire" length (end of tentacle(s), often stretched, to posterior tip of tail; in contrast to WL, measured from end of arms to posterior tip of tail)
- EyD, eye diameter
- FL, fin length
- FW, fin width
- HL, head length (most often base of arms to edge of mantle)
- HW, head width
- LD, lens diameter
- LRL, lower rostral length of beak
- ML, mantle length (used only where stated as such)
- MW, maximum mantle width (used only where stated as such)
- WL, "whole" length (end of arms, often damaged, to posterior tip of tail; in contrast to EL, measured from end of tentacles to posterior tip of tail)
- WT, weight

=== Repositories ===
Institutional acronyms are those defined by Leviton et al. (1985) and Leviton & Gibbs (1988). Where the acronym is unknown, the full repository name is listed.

- BMNH, Natural History Museum, Cromwell Road, London, England (formerly British Museum (Natural History))
- NMNH, National Museum of Natural History, Smithsonian Institution, Washington, District of Columbia, United States
- NMNZ, Museum of New Zealand Te Papa Tongarewa, Wellington, New Zealand (formerly Colonial Museum; Dominion Museum)

== Specimen images ==
The number directly below each image corresponds to the specimen or sighting, in the List of colossal squid, that the image depicts. The date on which the specimen was first captured, found, or observed is also given.

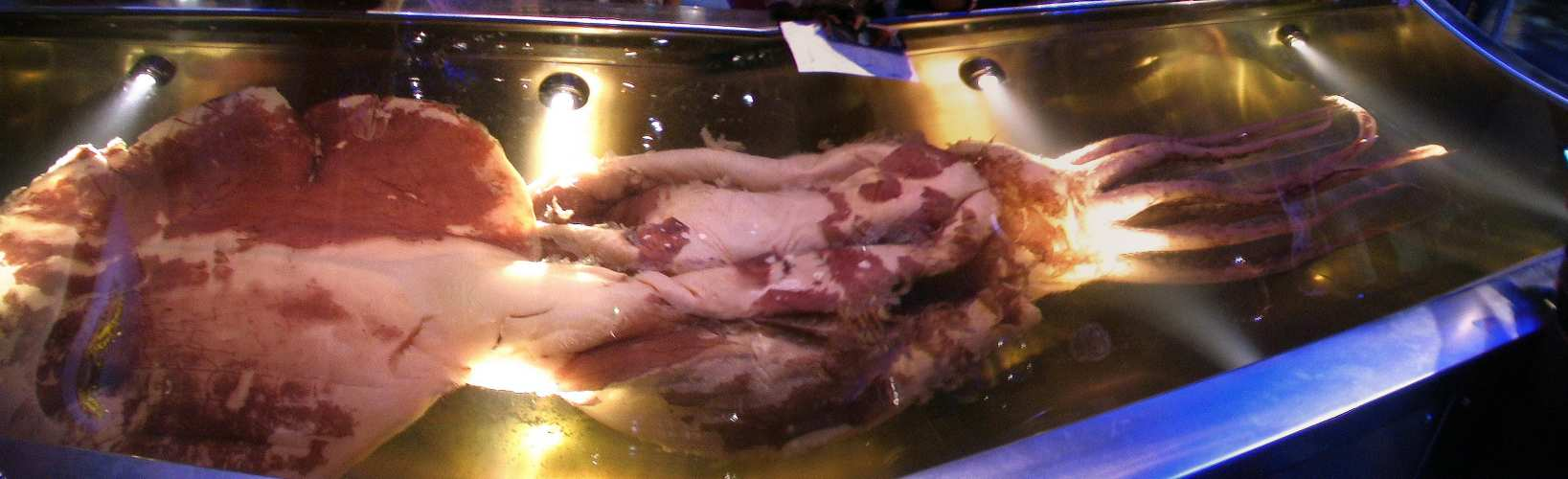
#19 (?/2/2007)
The preserved remains of the largest known colossal squid specimen, on display at the Museum of New Zealand Te Papa Tongarewa in Wellington in 2009

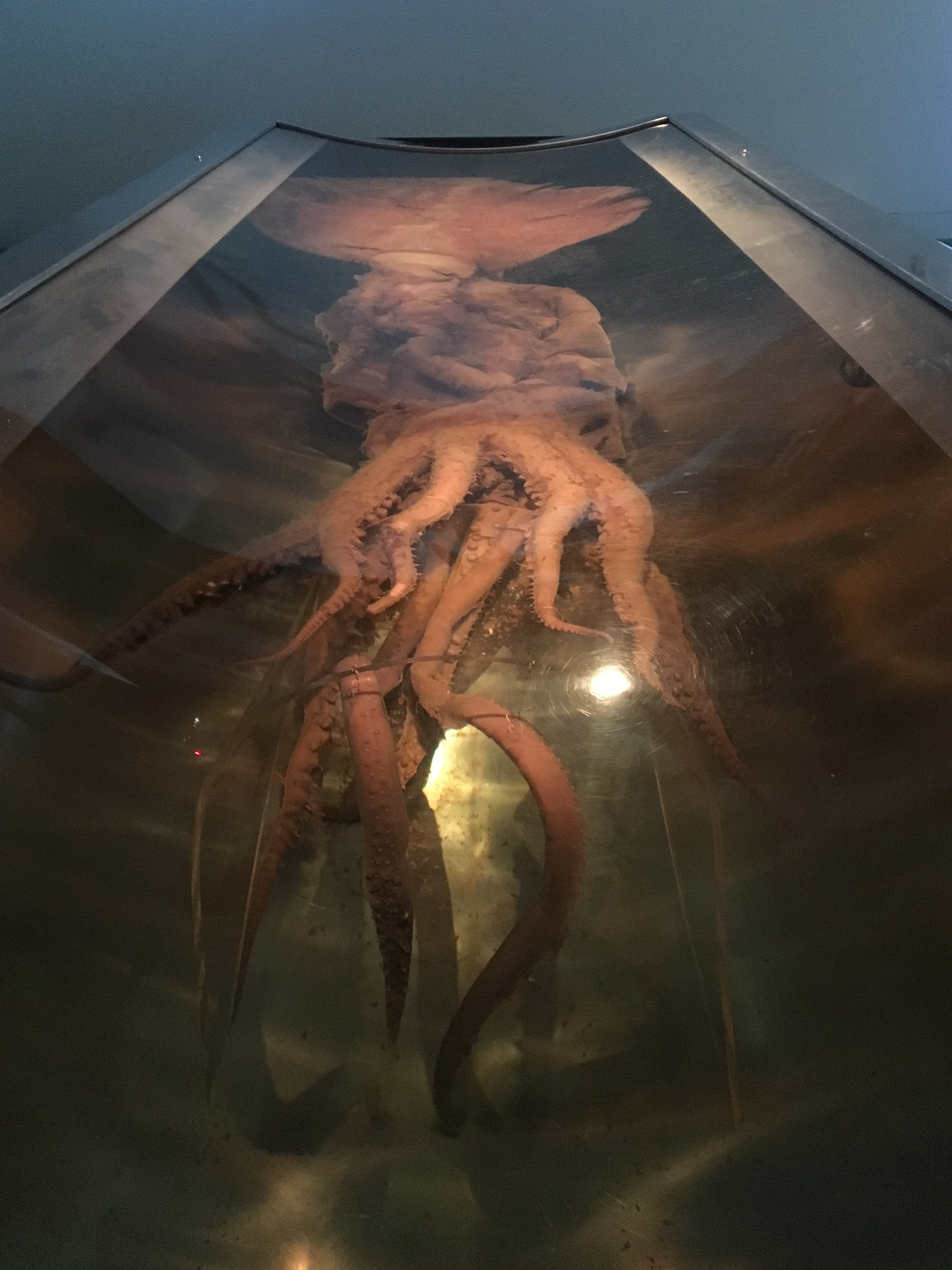
#19 (?/2/2007)
Oral view of the same specimen, as it appeared in 2019

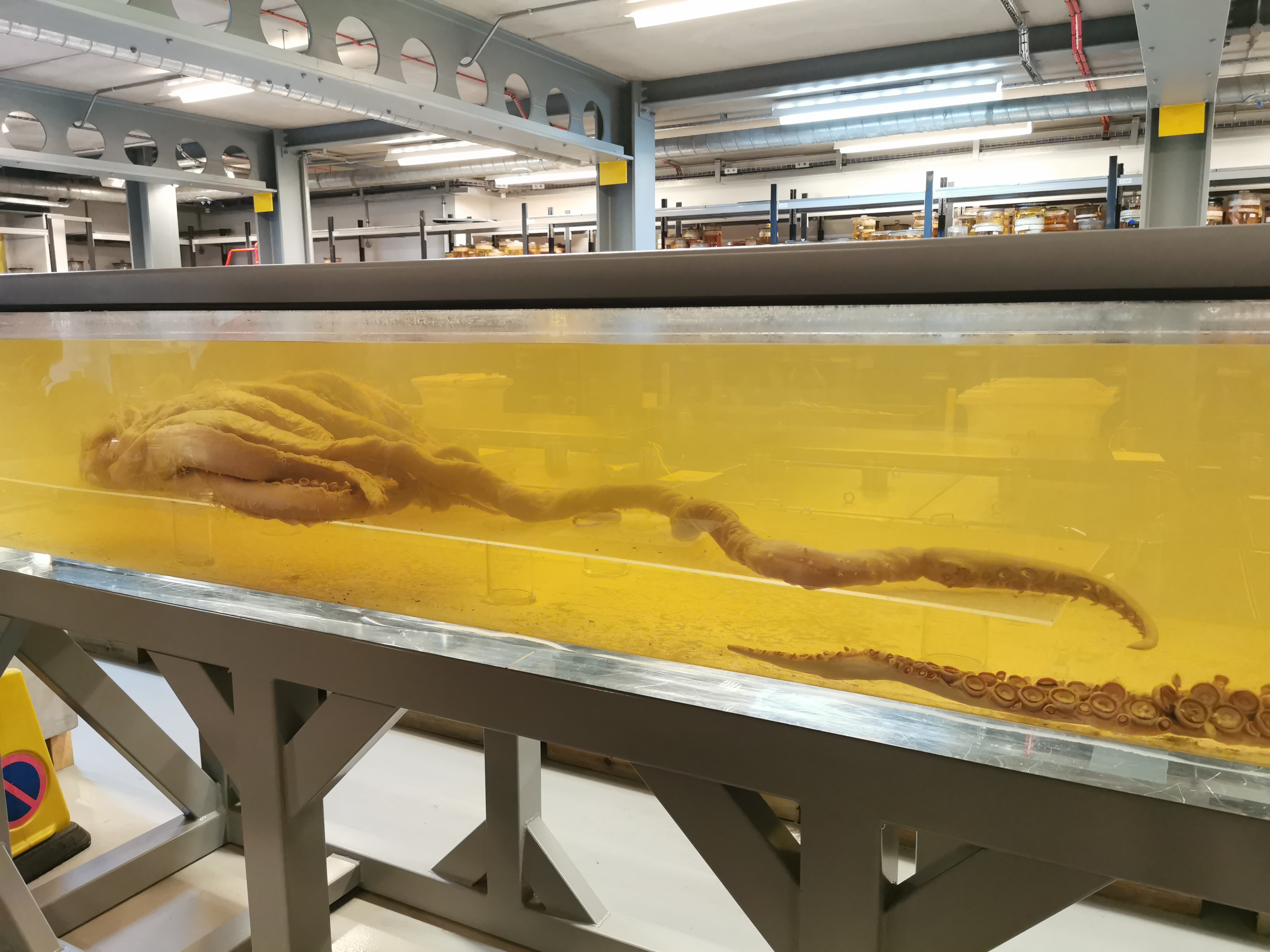
Head and limbs of a colossal squid displayed on a submerged plexiglass shelf next to the "Archie" giant squid specimen (tentacular club thereof visible to right) as part of the Spirit Collection Tour at London's Natural History Museum (NHM) (see also view from proximal end)

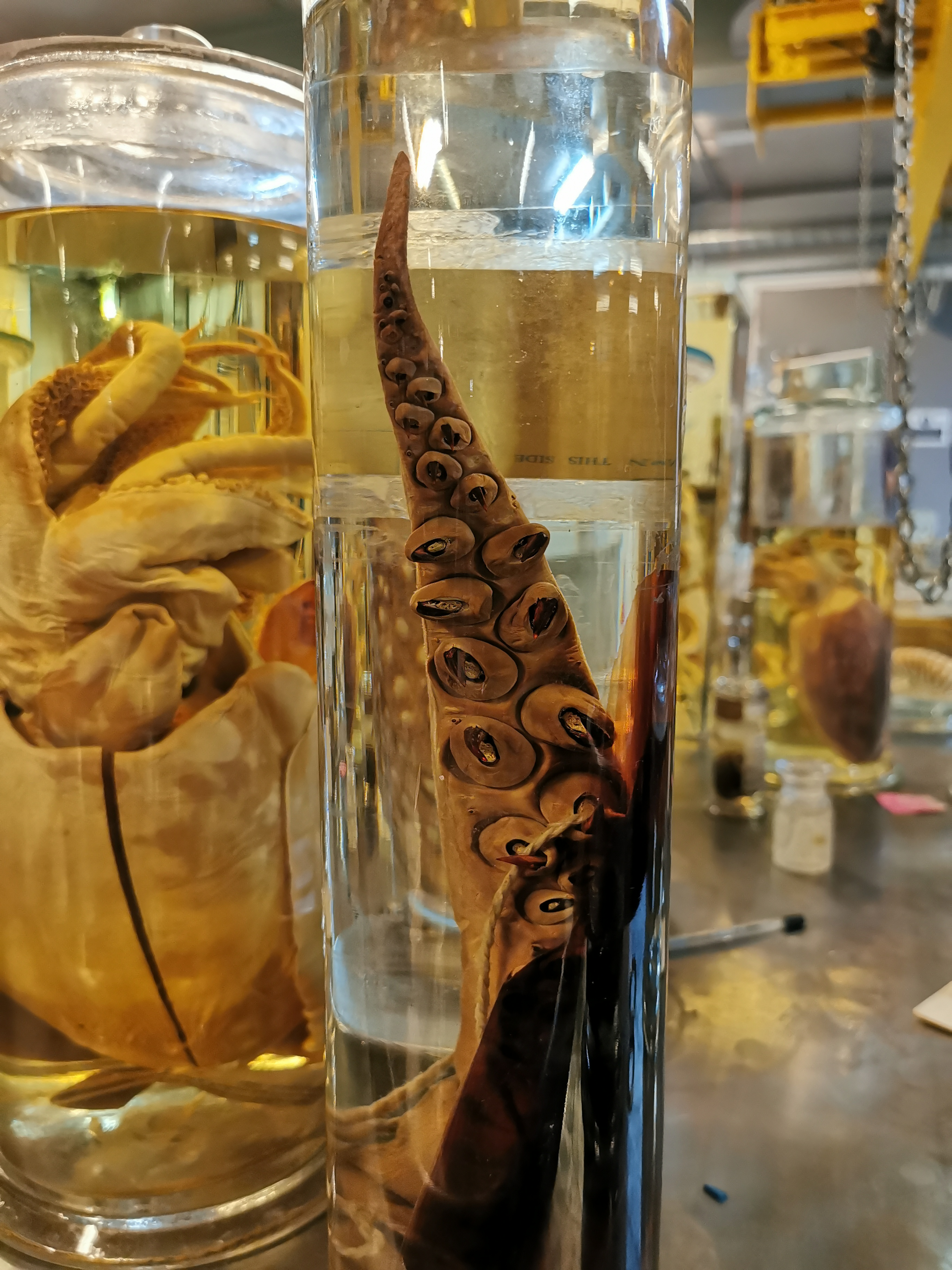
Tentacular club of a colossal squid collected by Malcolm R. Clarke, displayed in neutral formalin with two gladii of Loligo forbesii as part of the NHM's Spirit Collection Tour (see also specimen label and close-up of rotating suckers)

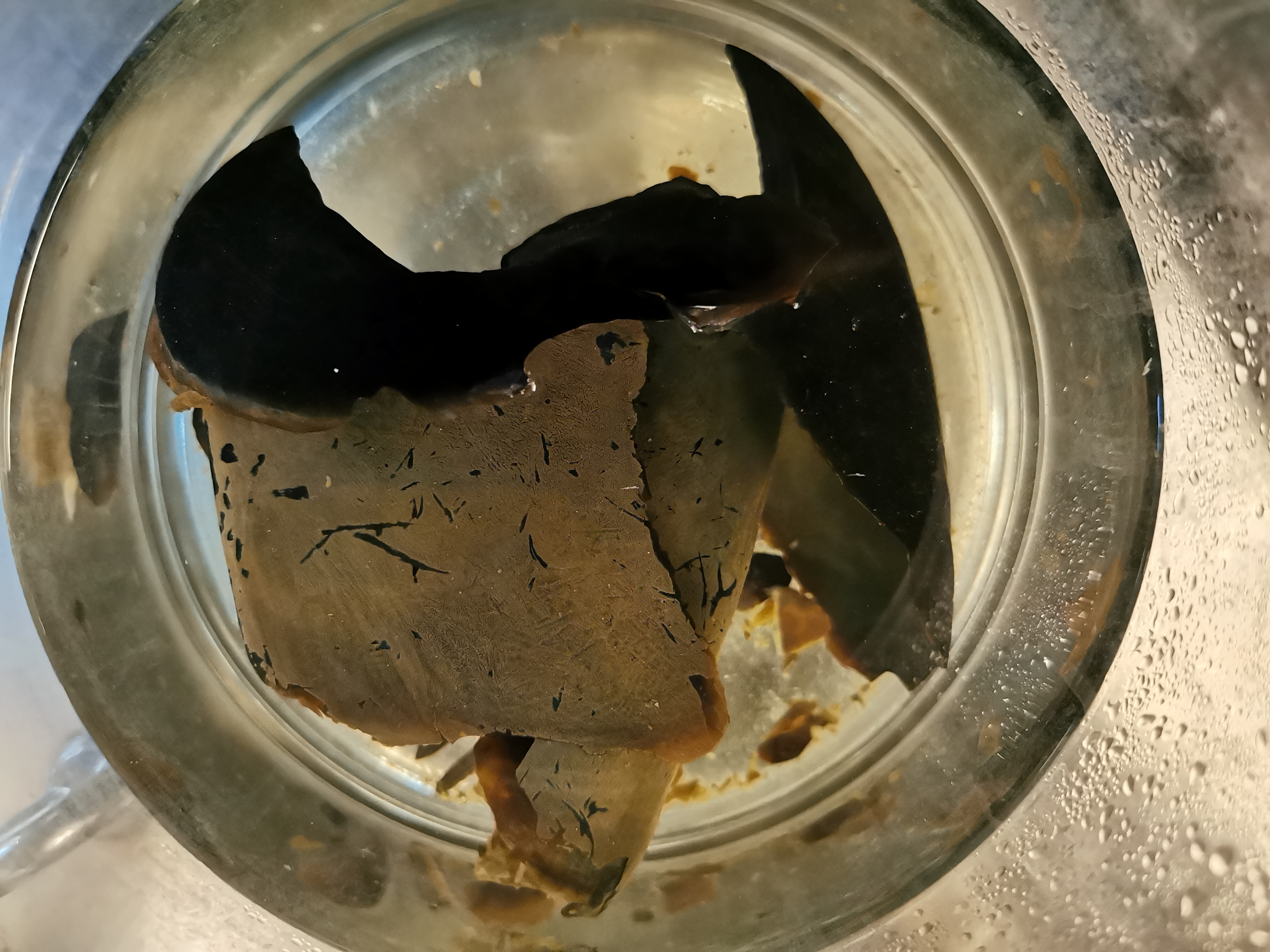
Two-part beak of a colossal squid exhibited during the NHM's Spirit Collection Tour

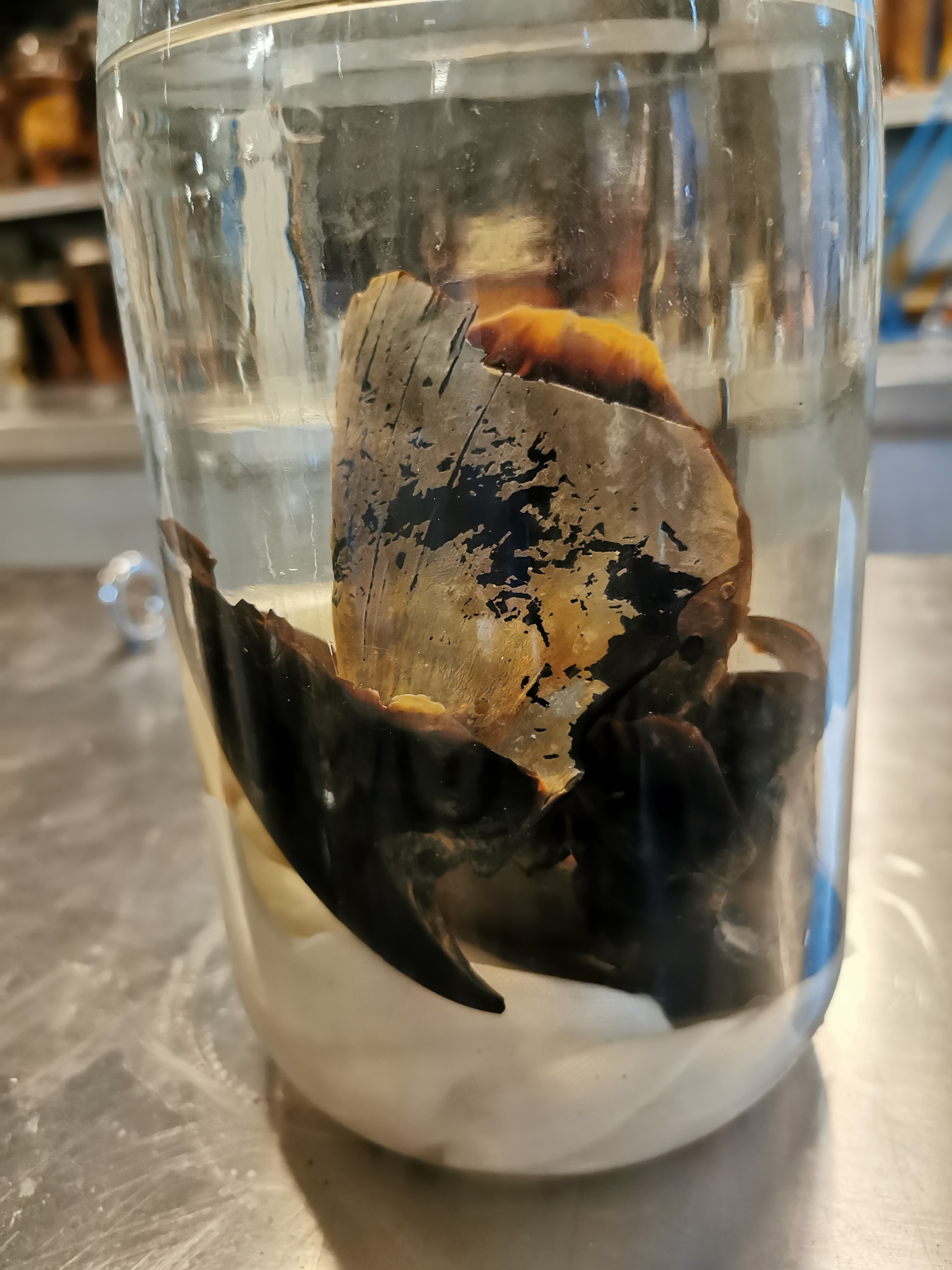
Another colossal squid beak on display as part of the NHM's Spirit Collection Tour (see also alternate view)

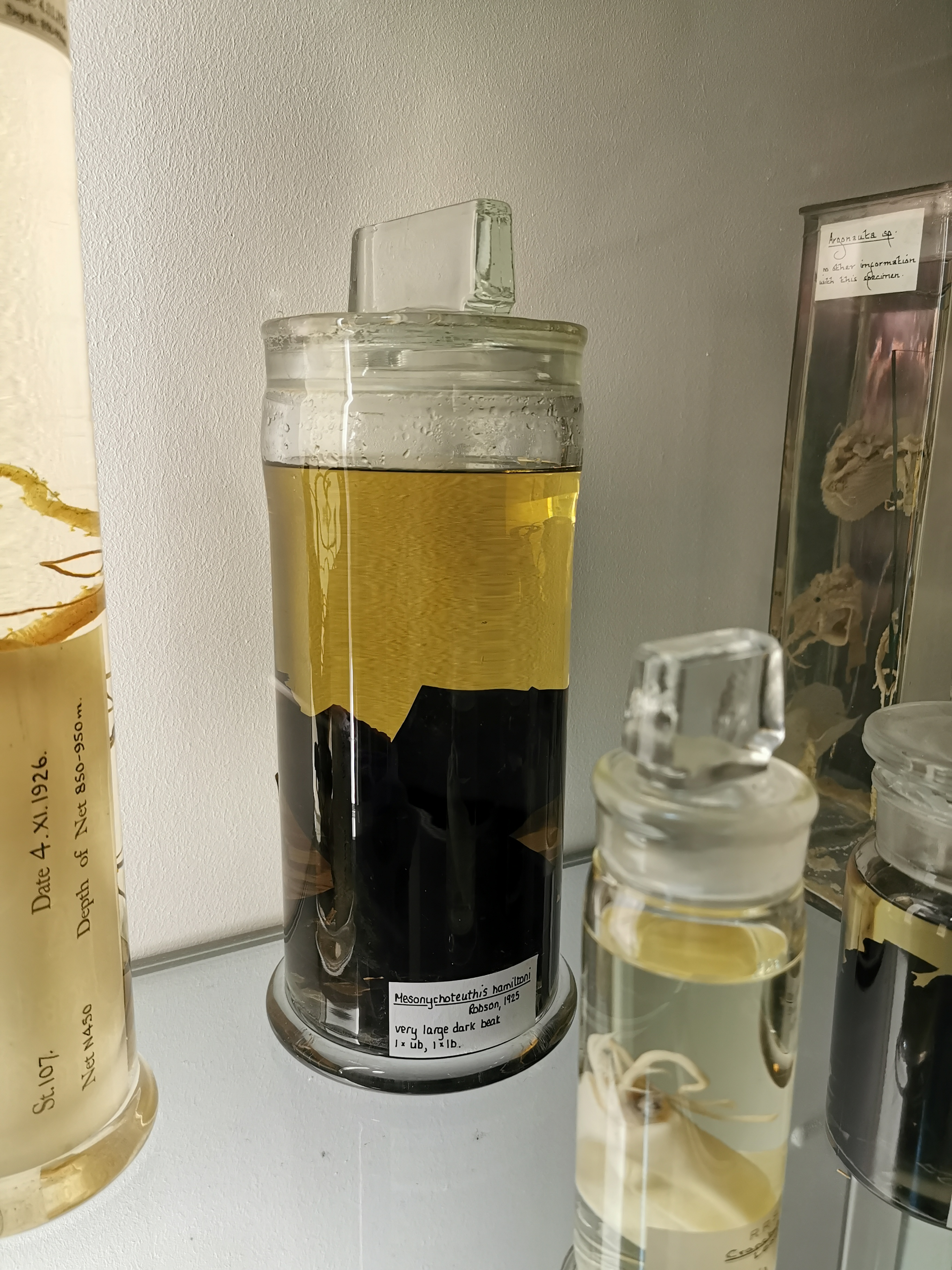
A "very large dark beak" of Mesonychoteuthis hamiltoni on display at the NHM's Darwin Centre
