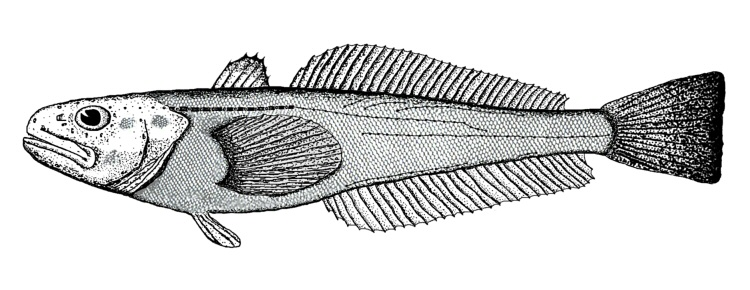
- Illustration of the 2nd known specimen

Scientific classification
- Kingdom: Animalia
- Phylum: Chordata
- Class: Actinopterygii
- Order: Perciformes
- Family: Nototheniidae
- Genus: Gvozdarus
- Species: G. svetovidovi

Binomial name
- Gvozdarus svetovidovi Balushkin, 1989

= Gvozdarus svetovidovi =

Species of fish

Gvozdarus svetovidovi, the naked-head toothfish, is a species of marine ray-finned fish belonging to the family Nototheniidae, the notothens or cod icefishes. It is found in the Ross and Cooperation Seas, probably south of the Antarctic Polar Front from pelagic waters down to depths of 550 m (1,804 ft), though it is normally found in a pelagic environment.

== Taxonomy ==
Gvozdarus svetovidovi was first formally described in 1989 by the Russian ichthyologist Arkadii Vladimirovich Balushkin with the type locality given as the Ross Sea at 73°36'S, 171°00'E, at a depth of 550 m (1,800 ft). When the genus Gvozdarus was described this species was the only species in the genus and was, therefore, its type species by monotypy. A second species, Gvozdarus balushkini, has since been added to the genus.

== Etymology ==
The specific name honours Anatoly Nikolaevich Svetovidov who was head of the Laboratory of Ichthyology at the USSR Academy of Sciences.

== Description ==
Gvozdarus svetovidovi has an elongate, fusiform body which is broadest at the front. The head is widest at its rear with a flat and wide space between the eyes and a snout which is longer than the diameter of its eyes. It has a large mouths which extends to the front of the pupil. The lower jaw protrudes slightly and both jaws have canine-like teeth with an inner patch near the jaw joint in the upper jaw. The body is covered in ctenoid scales but the head is naked. The first dorsal fin holds 7 spines, the second dorsal fin has 30 soft rays and the anal fin has 31 soft rays. This species is thought to attain a maximum total length of 100 cm (39 in). Their color is pale brown on the lower body while the head, back and flanks are dark. The dorsal fins are paler with transparent membranes. The pelvic and anal fins are light while the mouth and gill cavity are dark.

== Ecology ==
This species is a large, pelagic piscivore (fish-eating species, indicated by remains of the pelagic Antarctic silverfish (Pleuragramma antarcticum) found in stomachs).

== Commercial importance ==
This species is of no importance to commercial fisheries.
