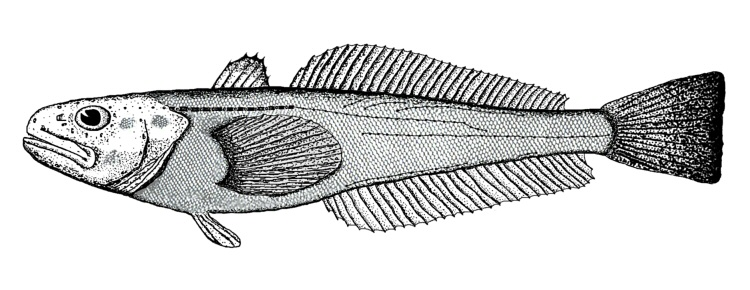
- Gvozdarus svetovidovi

Scientific classification
- Kingdom: Animalia
- Phylum: Chordata
- Class: Actinopterygii
- Order: Perciformes
- Family: Nototheniidae
- Genus: Gvozdarus; Balushkin, 1989

Type species
- Gvozdarus svetovidovi Balushkin, 1989

= Gvozdarus =

Genus of fishes

Gvozdarus is a genus of marine ray-finned fishes belonging to the family Nototheniidae, the notothens or cod icefishes. It is native to the Southern Ocean.

== Taxonomy ==
Gvozdarus was first formally described as a genus in 1989 by the Soviet ichthyologist Arkadii Vladimirovich Balushkin with the type species by monotypy being Gvozdarus svetovidovi, a second species has subsequently been described. Some authorities place this taxon in the subfamily Pleuragrammatinae, but the 5th edition of Fishes of the World does not include subfamilies in the Nototheniidae. The name of the genus is a Latinised version of a local name for the zander (Sander lucioperca) in Veliky Novgorod, Russia. Balushkin did not explain why he chose this name but it may refer to the similarity in form of G. svetovidovi, especially the long, pointed teeth, to the zander.

== Species ==
The recognized species in this genus are:

- Gvozdarus balushkini Voskoboinikova & Kellermann, 1993
- Gvozdarus svetovidovi Balushkin, 1989 (Naked-head toothfish)

== Characteristics ==
Gvozdarus notothens have an elongate, fusiform body which is broadest at the front. The head is widest at its rear with a flat and wide space between the eyes and a snout which is longer than the diameter of its eyes. They have large mouths which extends to the front of the pupil. The lower jaw protrudes slightly and both jaws have canine-like teeth with an inner patch near the jaw joint in the upper jaw. The largest known fish of this genus had a total length of 100 cm (39 in).

== Distribution, habitat and biology ==
Gvozdarus notothens are found in the Southern Ocean and the genus has a circumpolar distribution. The contents of the stomach of the holotype consisted of the remains, including a lower mandible, of the Antarctic silverfish (Pleuragramma antarcticum). The Antarctic silverfish is the most abundant pelagic fish found over the continental shelves of the Antarctic and this is taken to be an indication that these fishes are pelagic piscivores.
