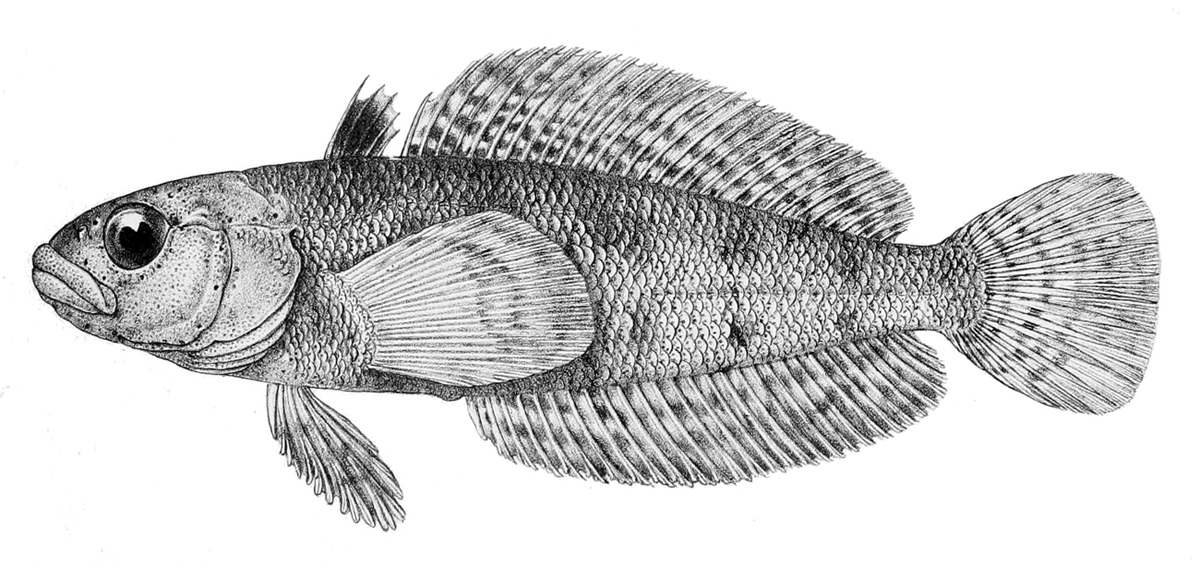

Scientific classification
- Kingdom: Animalia
- Phylum: Chordata
- Class: Actinopterygii
- Order: Perciformes
- Family: Nototheniidae
- Genus: Pagothenia
- Species: P. phocae

Binomial name
- Pagothenia phocae (Richardson, 1844)

Synonyms
- Notothenia phocae Richardson, 1844; Trematomus brachysoma Pappenheim, 1912; Pagothenia brachysoma Pappenheim, 1912; Pagothenia antarctica Nichols & La Monte, 1936

= Stocky rockcod =

Species of ray-finned fish

The stocky rockcod (Pagothenia phocae), also known as the bandtail notothen, is a species of marine ray-finned fish belonging to the family Nototheniidae, the notothens or cod icefishes. It is found in the Southern Ocean.

== Taxonomy ==
The stocky rockcod was first formally described in 1844 as Notothenia phocae by the Scottish naval surgeon, naturalist and Arctic explorer John Richardson with the type locality given as the Antarctic Glacial Ocean, off Victoria Land, the type being found among the stomach contents of a seal. The genus Pagothenia was described by John Treadwell Nichols and Francesca Raimonde La Monte in 1936 with a new species, P. antarctica as its type species and they noted that their new taxon was very alike Richardson's Notothenia phocae, P. antractica is now considered to be a junior synonym of N. phocae. The specific name phocae means "of a seal" as the holotypes were described after being identified in the stomach contents of a leopard seal (Hydrurga leptonyx).

Fishbase and some other authorities refer to this species as Pagothenia brachysoma which was described as Trematomus brachysoma by Paul Pappenheim in 1912 but Catalog of Fishes states that this is a synonym of Pagothenia phocae.

== Description ==
The stocky rockcod has an oblong body which is compressed towards the tail. It has a moderately sized mouth with the maxilla reaching to just beyond the front of the eye. The jaws are equipped with rows of small, sharp, conical teeth, larger at the front of the mouth and forming a single row at its back. The body is clothed in small, slightly ctenoid and non ctenoid scales with a largely naked head. The lateral lines are rather vague and have some tubed scales. The first dorsal fin has 4-5 spines, the second dorsal fin has 29-32 soft rays and the anal fin has 26-30 soft rays. This species attains a maximum total length of 17.2 cm (6.8 in). The overall colour is yellowish brown with a blue iridescence on the back, some individuals have patches of coral pink near the head. There are six dark spots on the back underneath the dorsal fins.

== Distribution, habitat and biology ==
The stocky rockcod is found in the Southern Ocean near to the shores of Antarctica in the Ross Sea, Davis Sea, Wilhelm II Coast, north of Edward VIII Ice Shelf and west coast of Antarctic Peninsula. This is a cryopelagic species, feeding on euphasids and copepods on the underside of the ice. The juveniles have been sound around the South Shetland Islands and Elephant Island in concentrations of krill.
