= Icefish =

Icefish may mean:

== Fish ==
- Channichthyidae, the crocodile icefish or white-blooded fish of the Antarctic region, so-named for their cold habitat and clear (colorless) blood without hemoglobin
  - Jonah's icefish (Neopagetopsis ionah), of the Southern Ocean
- Nototheniidae, the cod icefish or notothens of the Antarctic region, whose members have red, hemoglobin-rich blood
  - Patagonian toothfish (Dissostichus eleginoides), a species of Notothen found in cold southern waters
- Salangidae, the icefish or noodlefish, a family of small, transparent or semi-transparent ("ice-like") fishes found in fresh, brackish and marine waters in East Asia and the northwestern Pacific Ocean

== Other uses ==
- USS Icefish (SS-367), a submarine
- IceFish (band), a progressive rock project band started by Virgil Donati and Marco Sfogli

== See also ==
- Ice fishing
