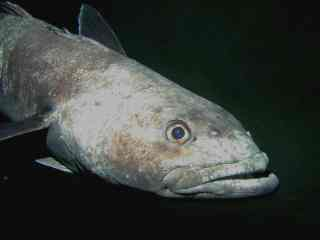
- Antarctic toothfish (D. mawsoni) in McMurdo Sound

Scientific classification
- Kingdom: Animalia
- Phylum: Chordata
- Class: Actinopterygii
- Order: Perciformes
- Family: Nototheniidae
- Genus: Dissostichus; Smitt, 1898

Type species
- Dissostichus eleginoides Smitt, 1898

Synonyms
- Macrias T. N. Gill & C. H. Townsend, 1901

= Dissostichus =

Antarctic toothfish, Antarctic cod

Genus of fish

Dissostichus, the toothfish, is a genus of marine ray-finned fish belonging to the family Nototheniidae, the notothens or cod icefish. These fish are found in the Southern Hemisphere. Toothfish are marketed for consumption in the United States as Chilean sea bass (or Chilean seabass) or less frequently as white cod. "Chilean sea bass" is a marketing name coined in 1977 by Lee Lantz, a fish wholesaler who wanted a more attractive name for selling the Patagonian toothfish to Americans. In 1994, the U.S. Food and Drug Administration (FDA) accepted "Chilean sea bass" as an "alternative market name" for Patagonian toothfish. The toothfish was remarkably successful in the United States, Europe and Asia, and earned the nickname "white gold" within the market. Toothfish are vital to the ecological structure of Southern Ocean ecosystems. For this reason, on 4 September a national day is dedicated to the toothfish in South Georgia.

== Taxonomy ==
Dissostichus was first described as a genus in 1898 by the Swedish zoologist Fredrik Adam Smitt, he was describing a new species from waters off Tierra del Fuego, Dissostichus eleginoides, which he placed as the only species in the new genus. Some authorities place this taxon in the subfamily Pleuragrammatinae, but the 5th edition of Fishes of the World does not include subfamilies in the Nototheniidae. The name of the genus Dissostichus is a compound of dissos which means "twofold" or "double" and stichus which means "row" or "line", an allusion to the two lateral lines of D. eleginoides.

=== Species ===
Two species in this genus are recognized:

- Dissostichus eleginoides Smitt, 1898 (Patagonian toothfish)
- Dissostichus mawsoni Norman, 1937 (Antarctic toothfish)

== Description ==
The Patagonian toothfish and the Antarctic toothfish are markedly similar in appearance, but can be identified via several morphological features. The Patagonian toothfish has a characteristic scaleless patch between the eyes and a longer visible lateral line.

Toothfishes are large in size, with both species reaching maximum sizes exceeding 100 kg. This trait distinguishes the toothfishes from other notothenioids.

== Distribution ==
The Patagonian toothfish is distributed circumpolarly near the Antarctic Convergence, spanning the Atlantic, Pacific and Indian sectors of the Southern Ocean, with a few populations near the Antarctic Peninsula as well as the coasts of Chile and Argentina. The Antarctic toothfish is distributed around the Antarctic continental shelf and in the Ross Sea, generally south of 60°S.

Both species are benthopelagic as adults. The Patagonian toothfish has been found at depths between 600 and 1500 m, and the Antarctic toothfish tends to be found at depths between 1300 and 1900 m. The Patagonian and Antarctic toothfish populations overlap geographically in the southern Indian Ocean, north of the Ross Sea and several south Atlantic islands. Since the Southern Ocean has not yet been fully sampled, both species may extend further throughout the region.

== Biology ==
Both species occupy similar ecological niches. They are piscivorous at all life stages. Juveniles mostly prey on smaller notothenioids, krill, squid and pelagic fishes. Prey range increases with maturity. As adults, both species consume a variety of fishes, cephalopods and crustaceans. The Patagonian toothfish is opportunistic, and sometimes scavenges penguin and fish remains that sink from the epipelagic zone. The toothfishes may compete with Adélie penguins for prey such as silverfish and krill.

Toothfish are important prey for large mammals. Patagonian toothfish predators include elephant seals, sperm whales, and killer whales. Antarctic toothfish predators include Weddell seals and whales, especially killer whales. Some data suggests that the overfishing of toothfish may stress whale populations. Hucke-Gaete et al. observed that when toothfish were removed from via longline capture, killer whales were more likely to prey on nearby sperm whales.

=== Life history ===
Much remains unknown regarding the life cycles of both toothfish species, particularly the Antarctic toothfish. Much of the existing data has been collected by reports from commercial fishing vessels. Current research suggests that both the Patagonian and Antarctic toothfishes tend to form discontinuous populations, meaning that little gene flow exists between populations.

Both species migrate during spawning season. However, the specific duration and distance of these migrations have not been fully characterized. Tag-and-release experiments on the Patagonian toothfish have indicated that most individuals migrate an average of 15 miles from their habitat, and that any migratory movement generally occurs after the fishes reach maturity. However, some anecdotal evidence demonstrates that the Patagonian toothfish may be capable of migrating between the northern and southern poles, likely by submerging beneath tropical and temperate waters.

Both species are long-lived and relatively slow-growing. The Patagonian toothfish can live up to at least 50 years of age and the Antarctic toothfish can live to at least 35 years of age. Both species show the fastest growth in the first 10 years of life, and reach maximum body size around 20 years of age. The Patagonian toothfish grows at an average rate of 2 cm and 1 kg per year.

==== Patagonian toothfish ====
The Patagonian toothfish spawns in deep waters during the austral winter and early spring, between June and September. Discontinuous oogenesis development patterns suggest that Patagonian toothfish do not spawn annually. Individuals migrate to spawn in shallower waters (800–1000 m), although migration patterns can vary widely between different geographic populations. Some data suggest that spawning yields decrease at higher latitudes.

Egg development occurs over a period of approximately three months, with hatching occurring in October or November. After hatching, the planktonic larvae drift for a period of time, likely until February. Around this time, the fish reach a critical size and become bathypelagic. They gradually inhabit deeper waters as they grow, migrating down the continental slope. Adult fish are generally found at depths greater than 500 m.

==== Antarctic toothfish ====
The life cycle of the Antarctic toothfish is less well-characterized. Researchers and fisheries are limited to collecting this species during the austral summer and autumn (December to May) due to harsh polar conditions during the austral winter (June to August). Scientists have not yet collected any juvenile or larvae Antarctic toothfish and have not yet verified the location, season or frequency of spawning activity. Hanchet et al. used all previously collected data from 1996 to 2008 to generate an updated model for the life cycle of the Antarctic toothfish within the Ross Sea fishery, although the authors note that much of this model is based on speculation and much of the data has not yet been collected fully. They estimated that the Antarctic toothfish adults spawn between June and November, and that spawning likely occurs north of 70°S, beyond the Ross continental shelf and slope.

Eggs likely have a development period of four to five months and hatch between November and February, developing more slowly than their Patagonian toothfish counterparts. Current data suggests that spawning requires a large amount of reproductive tissue, and may not occur annually. Planktonic larvae undergo larval drift for a period of several months, likely into late summer or early autumn. Researchers predict that the Antarctic toothfish inhabit benthic regions after reaching 15 cm. Sub-adult individuals develop within the Ross Sea and gradually inhabit deeper waters over a period of two to three years.

== Relation to humans ==
The Patagonian toothfish was initially captured in the 1970s as bycatch via trawl fishing vessels around South Georgia Island and off the coast of South America. Most of the individuals caught using this method were juveniles. In 1987, the Patagonian toothfish was caught as bycatch via longline fishing, a technique that captured the larger adults. The fish, marketed as "Chilean Sea Bass," became widely successful in restaurants due to its large size and white, oily flesh, which can be cooked in numerous ways.

Fish were collected in massive numbers, first in Chile and later in Argentina after the Chilean population declined abruptly in 1994. Exploratory fisheries for the Antarctic toothfish were established in the Ross Sea in 1996/1997. The fisheries for the two toothfish species are intended to be distinct; however, there is some concern that the species may be indistinguishable to commercial fishermen. In 2013, the FDA eliminated market distinctions between the species, meaning that the Antarctic toothfish, like its congener, could also be marketed as Chilean Sea Bass. Previously, the Antarctic toothfish was sold under the name "toothfish."

=== Commercial fisheries ===
All fisheries south of the Antarctic Convergence are regulated by the Commission for the Conservation of Antarctic Marine Living Resources (CCAMLR), which is a subset of the international Antarctic Treaty System designed to prevent exploitation of the region’s natural resources. CCAMLR currently oversees thirteen licensed toothfish fisheries, including seven exploratory fisheries and one research fishery. The five established fisheries target the Patagonian toothfish exclusively, and the exploratory fisheries, mostly concentrated in the Ross Sea, target the Antarctic toothfish primarily. The research fishery targets both species.

The Patagonian toothfish, which has been caught and sold since 1977, is currently being removed legally from the Southern Ocean at an estimated rate of 12,000 to 17,000 tons per year. The Antarctic toothfish, which has been caught and sold since 1988, is currently being removed legally from the Southern Ocean at an estimated rate of 4,000 tons per year. All known Antarctic toothfish and most Patagonian toothfish populations fall within the CCAMLR Convention Area. Northern Patagonian toothfish populations are managed by the nations that control the respective regions in which the populations reside; however, these nations are required to adhere to CCAMLR regulations.

=== Illegal, unreported and unregulated fishing ===
As of 2014, CCAMLR was allowing fisheries to remove the Antarctic toothfish at rates that would reduce the population to 50 percent of its current biomass. However, some scientists are concerned that estimations of toothfish biomass may be inaccurate due to a number of factors, including illegal, unreported and unregulated (IUU) fishing activities.

IUU activities can be challenging to prevent and prove. However, centralized international collaborative efforts (between Australia, New Zealand, the United Kingdom and France) to mitigate IUU activities have been reported as successful. As of 2012, measures included CCAMLR’s catch-documentation scheme along with on-sea, satellite and aerial surveillance. A 2012 report indicated that implementation of these measures has reduced IUU activity by 90 percent. However, in 2014 others stated that these numbers may be inaccurate, as IUU fishing in the Southern Ocean is difficult to prove.

=== Conservation efforts ===
In June 2010, 500 scientists formed the Antarctic and Southern Ocean Coalition (ASOC), advocating to CCAMLR for special protection of the entire Ross Sea. Chilean Sea Bass has been placed on the Red Lists of Greenpeace International and the One World One Ocean Campaign. As a result, a number of restaurant and grocery owners have publicly opted not to prepare or sell Chilean Sea Bass. Furthermore, advocacy projects have been undertaken to increase the scope of public awareness. The New Zealand documentary The Last Ocean was created to communicate the issue of toothfish fisheries, conveying the need to protect the Southern Ocean’s native biodiversity.

In October 2016, a 1.55 million km^{2} region of the Ross Sea was designated as a marine protected area by the CCAMLR, meaning that most fishing is banned in the area. The area will remain protected until 2052.

== See also ==
- Toothfish Day
- Patagonian Toothfish
- Antarctic Toothfish
