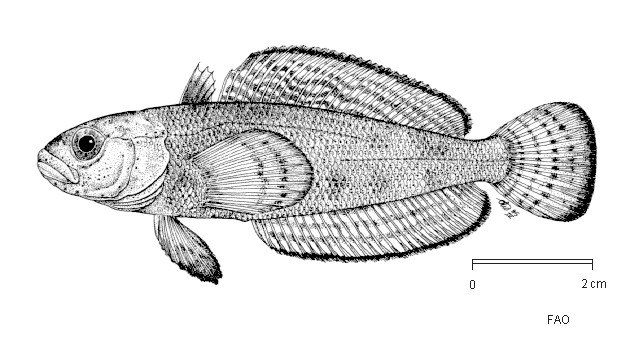
- Pagothenia phocae

Scientific classification
- Kingdom: Animalia
- Phylum: Chordata
- Class: Actinopterygii
- Order: Perciformes
- Family: Nototheniidae
- Genus: Pagothenia; Nichols & La Monte, 1936

Type species
- Pagothenia antarctica Nichols & La Monte, 1936

= Pagothenia =

Genus of fishes

Pagothenia is a genus of marine ray-finned fishes, belonging to the family Nototheniidae, the notothens or cod icefishes. These fishes occur in the Southern Ocean.

== Taxonomy ==
Pagothenia was formally described as a monotypic genus in 1936 by the American zoologists John Treadwell Nichols and Francesca Raimonde La Monte with the type species being P. antarctica which Nichols and La Monte were describing as a new species. P. antarctica was subsequently shown to be a synonym of P. brachysoma which was described by the German zoologist Paul Pappenheim in 1912. P. brachysoma is now regarded as a junior synonym of Notothenia phocae which was described in 1844 by the naval surgeon, Arctic explorer and naturalist John Richardson. Some authorities place this genus in the subfamily Trematominae, but the 5th edition of Fishes of the World does not include subfamilies in the Nototheniidae. Nichols and La Monte did not explain the etymology of the generic name but it may be a compound of the Greek words pagos which means "frost", being the root of the word pagophilia for someone who thrives or prefers to live in ice, and thenia which means "coming from" possibly a reference to the occurrence of P. antarctica under ice, the types being captured through a seal hole in crevasse filled with water.

== Species ==
The recognized species in this genus are:

- Pagothenia borchgrevinki (Boulenger, 1902) (bald notothen)
- Pagothenia phocae (Richardson, 1844) (stocky rockcod)

== Characteristics ==
Pagothenia have oblong bodies which are compressed towards the tail. They have a moderately sized mouth with the maxilla reaching to just beyond the front of the eye. The jaws are equipped with rows of small, sharp, conical teeth, larger at the front of the mouth and forming a single row at its back. The body is clothed in small, slightly ctenoid and non ctenoid scales with a largely naked head. The lateral lines are rather vague and may, or may not, have tubed scales. The rounded caudal fin has 16-17 branched rays. The pectoral fins are longer than the pelvic fins. The bald notothen reaches a maximum total length of 28 cm (11 in) while the stocky rock off is smaller with a maximum total length of 17.2 cm (6.8 in).

== Distribution, habitat and biology ==
Pagothenia are found in the Southern Ocean around Antarctica where they are cryopelagic, living on the underside of the sea ice. The juveniles have been found among krill swarms. The adults feed on krill and copepods. They spawn annually and have a long pelagic larval phase.
