= Toothfish Day =

Annual public holiday on 4 September

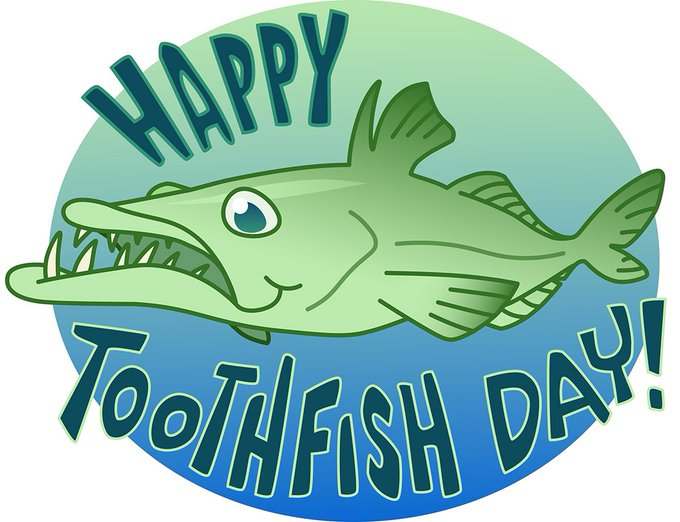
- A "Happy Toothfish Day" greeting illustrated by artist Ole Comoll
- Observed by: South Georgians & South Sandwich Islanders
- Significance: Holiday marking the end of toothfish fishing season
- Date: 4 September
- Next time: 4 September 2026
- Frequency: Annual

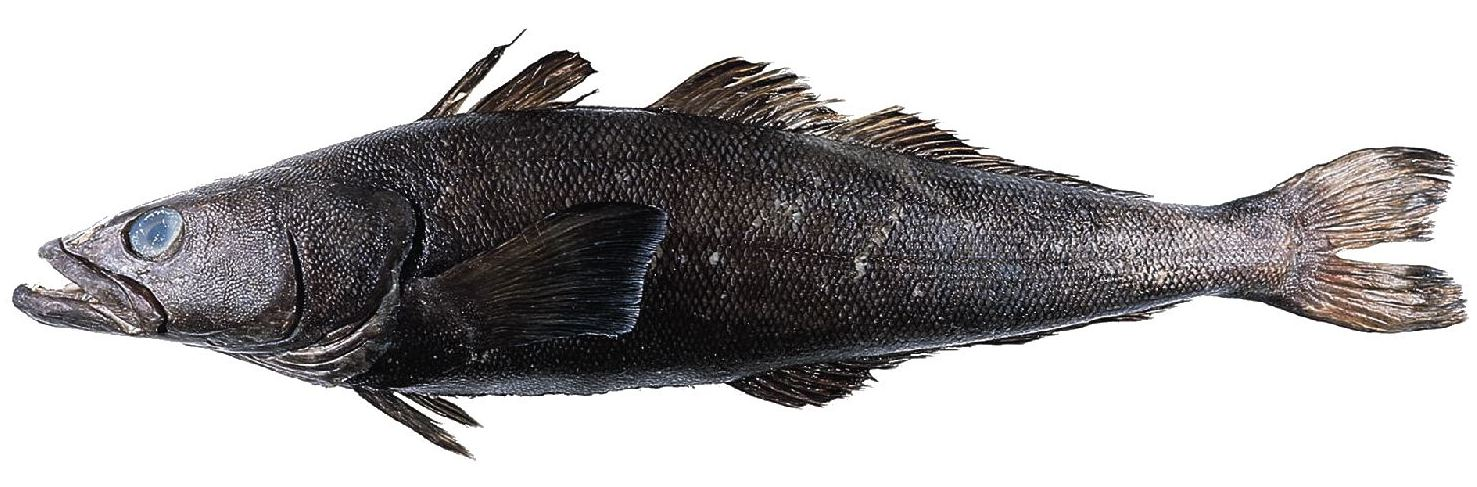
A specimen of a Patagonian toothfish (Dissostichus eleginoides)

Toothfish Day is a public holiday celebrated in the British Overseas Territory of South Georgia and the South Sandwich Islands. Usually held on 4 September, the holiday marks the end of the toothfish fishing season and shows the importance of the Patagonian toothfish fishery and sustainable fishing practices. To commemorate the holiday, the Government of South Georgia and the South Sandwich Islands holds a reception in Government House. Previously, it was known as Toothfish (end of season) Day from 2012 to 2014.

== Background ==
Toothfish Day is a public holiday celebrated in the British Overseas Territory of South Georgia and the South Sandwich Islands. It is annually commemorated on 4 September as a bank holiday, though it may be observed on a weekday if the date lands on a weekend. It is one of eleven public holidays in South Georgia and the South Sandwich Islands, which are appointed by the Governor in Council.

The holiday marks the end of the toothfish (Dissostichus, also called the Chilean sea bass) fishing season. Locals celebrate with a toast for the holiday. The Government of South Georgia and the South Sandwich Islands (GSGSSI) celebrates Toothfish Day with a reception at Government House in Stanley, Falkland Islands. The reception includes a quiz, a toast, spin the bottle, and a menu featuring dishes made with toothfish. GSGSSI also holds meetings and a reception in London in the mainland United Kingdom to mark the occasion.

The holiday was created to show the importance of the Patagonian toothfish (Dissostichus eleginoides) fishery and to highlight the sustainable fishing practices of the industry in the territory. The holiday dates back to at least 2012, when it was called "Toothfish (end of season) Day" and took place on 14 September. The holiday replaced a previously undesignated bank holiday. It remained under that name and stayed in mid-September until 2015, when it was instituted as simply Toothfish Day and moved to 4 September.

== Past dates ==
Past observances of Toothfish Day
Year	Date	Date Observed	Name	Reception Date
2012	14 September	14 September	Toothfish (end of season) Day	
2013	13 September	13 September	Toothfish (end of season) Day	
2014	15 September	15 September	Toothfish (end of season) Day	
2015	4 September	4 September	Toothfish Day	
2016	5 September	5 September	Toothfish Day	6 September
2017	4 September	4 September	Toothfish Day	
2018	4 September	4 September	Toothfish Day	
2019	4 September	4 September	Toothfish Day	4 September
2020	4 September	4 September	Toothfish Day	7 September
2021	4 September	6 September	Toothfish Day	29 September
2022	5 September	5 September	Toothfish Day	
2023	4 September	4 September	Toothfish Day	
