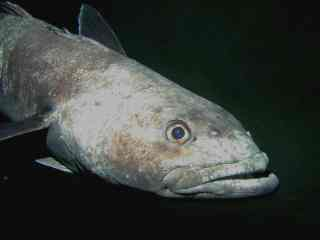

Scientific classification
- Kingdom: Animalia
- Phylum: Chordata
- Class: Actinopterygii
- Division: Teleostei
- Order: Perciformes
- Family: Nototheniidae
- Genus: Dissostichus
- Species: D. mawsoni

Binomial name
- Dissostichus mawsoni Norman, 1937

= Antarctic toothfish =

Species of fish

The Antarctic toothfish (Dissostichus mawsoni), also known as the Antarctic cod, is a large, black or brown fish found in very cold (even subzero) waters of the Southern Ocean near Antarctica. It is the largest species of bony fish in the Southern Ocean, feeding largely on smaller fishes and crustaceans, and, in turn, preyed on by orcas, other toothed whales, and seals. It is caught for food and marketed as Chilean sea bass together with its sister species, the more northerly Patagonian toothfish (D. eliginoides). Often mistakenly called "Antarctic cod", the Antarctic toothfish is a species in the (Nototheniidae), a family of fishes abundant in subantarctic waters.

== Name and taxonomy ==
The common name "toothfish" refers to the two rows of teeth in the upper jaw, thought to give it a shark-like appearance.

The genus name Dissostichus is from the Greek dissos (twofold) and stichus (line) and refers to the presence of two long lateral lines that enable the fish to sense prey. The species name, mawsoni, honors the Australian geologist Douglas Mawson who led the 1911–1914 Australasian Antarctic Expedition that explored the Antarctic coast and obtained the species' type specimen.

The Antarctic toothfish was first formally described in 1937 from the English ichthyologist John Roxborough Norman with the type locality given as off MacRobertson Land at 66°45'S, 62°03'E in Antarctica.

== Description ==
Fully grown, antarctic toothfish, (like their warmer-water relatives, the Patagonian toothfish, D. eleginoides) may grow to more than 1.7 m (5 ft 7 in) in length and 135 kg in mass, twice as large as the next-largest Antarctic species of fishes. Being large, and consistent with the unstructured food webs of the ocean (i.e., big fish eating little fish regardless of identity, even eating their own offspring), the Antarctic toothfish has been characterized as a voracious predator. Furthermore, by being by far the largest midwater fish in the Southern Ocean, it is thought to fill the ecological role that sharks play in other oceans. As an adaptation to that role, the Antarctic toothfish is one of only five notothenioid species that, as adults, are neutrally buoyant. This buoyancy is attained at 100–120 cm in length and enables them to spend time above the bottom without wasting energy. Both bottom-dwelling and mid-water prey are, therefore, available to them. Most other notothenioid fish and the majority of all Antarctic fishes, including smaller toothfish, are confined to the bottom. Coloring is black to olive brown, sometimes lighter on the undersides, with a mottled pattern on body and fins. Small fish blend in very well among the benthic sponges and corals. The species has a broad head, an elongated body, long dorsal and anal fins, large pectoral fins, and a rudder-like caudal fin. They typically move slowly, but are capable of speed bursts that may elude predatory seals.

== Feeding ecology ==
Over the continental shelf, Antarctic toothfish feed on shrimp (Nauticaris spp.) and small fish, principally another neutrally buoyant nototheniid, the Antarctic silverfish (Pleuragramma antarcticum). This loosely schooling species is also a major prey of Adélie (Pygoscelis adeliae) and emperor penguins (Aptenodytes forsteri), Weddell seals (Leptonychotes weddellii) and Antarctic minke whales (Balaenoptera bonaerensis). Therefore, competition for prey among toothfish and these other mesopredators (middle trophic level predators) could be very important. The large Antarctic toothfish are eaten by sperm whales (Physeter macrocephalus), killer whales (Orcinus orca), Weddell seals, and possibly colossal squid (Mesonychoteuthis hamiltoni). Toothfish that are dwelling on the bottom, particularly those caught during the summer on the continental slope, eat mainly grenadiers (Macrouridae), but also feed on other smaller fish species and skates (Raja spp.). They also feed on the colossal squid. Antarctic toothfish have been caught to depths of 2200 m, though based on commercial fishing effort, few occur that deep.

== Aging and reproduction ==
Aging data indicate Antarctic toothfish are relatively fast-growing when young, but then growth slows later in life. They reach about one-third of maximum size after 5 years, and half maximum by 10 years, after which growth slows considerably. To grow fast when small is an adaptation of most predatory fish, e.g., sharks, so as not to be small for very long. The maximum age recorded so far has been 48 years. Antarctic toothfish take a long time to mature (13 years for males, 17 years for females) and once mature may not spawn every year, though the actual spawning interval is undocumented. Only a few Antarctic toothfish with mature eggs have ever been caught, meaning knowledge is sparse about fecundity. They spawn sometime during winter. Large, mature, older fish have been caught among the seamounts of the Pacific-Antarctic Ridge, a location thus thought to be important for spawning. Smaller, subadult Antarctic toothfish tend to concentrate in shallower waters on the continental shelf, while a large portion of the older fish are found on in the continental slope. This sequestering by size and age could be another adaptation for small fish to avoid being eaten by large ones. The recruitment potential of Antarctic toothfish, a measure of both fecundity and survival to spawning age, is not known.

== Anatomy and physiology ==
The Antarctic toothfish has a lightweight, partially cartilaginous skeleton, lacks a swim bladder, and has fatty deposits which act as a stored energy source, particularly during spawning. This fat also makes large toothfish neutrally buoyant. Many toothfish caught over the seamounts are very depleted of fat, and this is thought perhaps to be related to spawning and spawning migration, which are energy-demanding activities. It is not known what happens to these fat-depleted fish, including whether they reach, or how long it takes them to reach, breeding condition again; this ostensibly occurs upon returning to continental-slope waters. Antarctic toothfish have vision and lateral line systems well adapted to find prey in low light levels. Since ice covers the surface of the ocean where Antarctic toothfish occur even in summer, these sensory specializations likely evolved to enable survival in the reduced light levels found under ice and in the Antarctic winter, as well as at deep depths. Antarctic toothfish also have a very well developed sense of smell, which is why they are easily caught by baited hooks and also scavenge the remains of penguins killed by other predators.

== Cold adaptation ==
The Antarctic toothfish lives in subzero degree water below latitude 60°S. It is noteworthy, like most other Antarctic notothenioids, for producing antifreeze glycoproteins, a feature not seen in its closest relative, the Patagonian toothfish, which typically inhabits slightly warmer waters. The presence of antifreeze glycoproteins allows the Antarctic toothfish (and other notothenioids) to thrive in subzero waters of the Southern Ocean surrounding Antarctica. The Antarctic toothfish's voracious appetite also is important in coping with cold water. It is mainly caught in the Ross Sea in the austral summer, but has also been recorded from Antarctic coastal waters south of the Indian Ocean sector, in the vicinity of the Antarctic Peninsula, and near the South Sandwich Islands.

== Fishery and associated ecosystem ==
A fishery for Antarctic toothfish, managed by the Convention for the Conservation of Antarctic Marine Living Resources (CCAMLR), has existed since 1997. The existence of this fishery in the Ross Sea, the area where most Antarctic toothfish are caught, is very contentious - the main argument proposed for this is the lack of accurate population parameters, such as original stock size, fecundity, and recruitment. Moreover, the main fishing grounds are presumed by some researchers to cover the area through which the entire stock of Antarctic toothfish pass. Typically, the fishing season has finished in the area by the end of February and for the remainder of the year, much of the area is covered by sea ice, providing a natural impediment to fishing. This fishery is characterised by opponents as being a challenge to manage owing to the nature of benthic longline fishing. The bycatch of other fish can also be significant, with the ratio of toothfish caught ranging from 4.5% to 17.9% and averaging 9.3% from the 1999/2000 fishing season to 2013/14 in CCAMLR Subarea 88.1 when the toothfish catch first exceeded 50 tonnes and from 2.3% to 24.5% averaging 12.4% in CCAMLR Subarea 88.2 up to the latest publicly available figure from 2013/14. The bycatch of other fish species is also regulated to a maximum amount annually by CCAMLR. CCAMLR decision rules are based on determining the catch level that will ensure that the median estimated spawning stock biomass (not total biomass) is greater than or equal to 50% of the average pre-exploitation spawning biomass after a further 35 years of fishing (i.e. 35 years from each year of assessment), with the additional condition that the probability is less than a 10% that the spawning biomass will decline below 20% of the pre-exploitation level at any time during this period. Current spawning stock biomass for Antarctic toothfish in the Ross Sea Region is estimated to be at 75% of the pre-exploitation level (95% Bayesian probability interval 71–78%), well above the 50% target reference point.

An independent study was reported to have detected the disappearance of large fish at the southern periphery of its range in the McMurdo Sound and was postulated to be consistent with this apparent loss of large fish. However, more recent work has shown this was not the case in 2014. Some studies have reported that the prevalence of fish-eating killer whales has been apparently decreasing in the southern Ross Sea, foraging efficiency of Weddell seals is decreasing, and numbers of Adélie penguins (competitors for Antarctic silverfish) have been increasing. More recent studies have confirmed visual sightings of Weddell seals and Type-C killer whales holding and consuming large toothfish in the McMurdo Sound area and raise questions over the previously assumed importance of assumed dominance of Antarctic silverfish (Pleuragramma antarcticum) in the diet of Weddell seal and Type-C killer whales. These reports highlight the importance of managing this fishery in the maintenance of the ecosystem by continuing to collect information on both Antarctic toothfish life history and the interaction of that species with predators and prey. An important research programme in this regard is the annual 'Shelf' survey carried out annually since 2012, which is designed to monitor the abundance of subadult Antarctic toothfish in areas where subadult-sized fish have been regularly found (e.g., in the southern Ross Sea) has been designed provide data to better estimate recruitment variability and provide an important early-warning signal of changes in toothfish recruitment. The project also is used for additional targeted data collection to better understand the lifecycle and ecosystem role of Antarctic toothfish.

Research has provided evidence for long-distance migrations of type-C killer whales between the Ross Sea and New Zealand waters, indicating a much wider range that had been postulated by a number of scientists. One adult female type-C killer whale has been seen in both New Zealand waters and McMurdo Sound, Antarctica, and a high large proportion of type-C killer whales sighted in McMurdo Sound have scars caused by cookiecutter sharks that are currently assumed to be limited to north of 50°S. At the same time as this study was occurring, Italian whale experts at Terra Nova Bay, about 360 km north of Scott Base, deployed satellite transmitters on type-C killer whales to determine the whales' movements. Their results independently verified that type-C killer whales were commuting between Scott Base and the waters off Northland.

The total catch of Antarctic toothfish in 2013–14 was 3820 tonnes; 3,320 tonnes of this were taken from the Ross Sea (FAO Statistical Divisions 88.1 and 88.2), with the remainder taken from other high seas areas within the CCAMLR convention area.

== Management ==
The ecosystem approach to fishing is encapsulated in Article II of the CAMLR Convention. The ecosystem approach uses decision rules based on both population status targets and limit reference points, and incorporates uncertainty and ecosystem status in the calculation of these targets. Different reference points to account for the needs of dependent predators in the ecosystem are used depending on the location of the species in the food web. The ecosystem fisheries management approach by CCAMLR involves use of move-on rules to protect trophic interactions, and limit direct effects of fishing on fish bycatch, seabirds, and vulnerable marine ecosystems. Annually reviewed mitigation measures such as line weighting and streamer lines minimize seabird bycatch, which have resulted in a substantial reduction in accidental seabird mortalities in the CAMLR Convention Area. The 50% (target) and 20% (limit) reference points used by the CCAMLR decision rules exceed the requirements for target and limit reference points set by almost all national and international fisheries management organizations, even for species longer lived than toothfish. A wide study of many fisheries generally indicated that most reach maximum sustainable yield at 30–35% of their pre-exploitation abundances. CCAMLR uses a more conservative reference level to allow exploitation at a level where toothfish recruitment and the ecosystem in general is not appreciably impacted. This is required by Article II of the CAMLR Convention. A common misunderstanding of the CCAMLR decision rules is an assumption that the decline in population size will follow a clear trajectory from the starting year to a point 35 years later when the stock size will reach 50% of pre-exploitation levels and an assumption that no feedback occurs during each assessment. The catch limit, though, is recalculated based on all updated or revised data at each annual or biennial assessment. This approach is used to ensure that the 50% level will be approached slowly and enables an ongoing readjustment of catch levels as knowledge improves.

=== Environment and bycatch ===
CCAMLR imposes stringent environmental protection and bycatch mitigation measures to Antarctic toothfish fisheries, including:

- Monitoring of daytime setting and movement of vessels from the fishery should any vessel catch more than three seabirds
- Use of streamer lines during setting to keep birds away from baited hooks
- Weighting of lines to ensure fast sink rates to prevent seabirds from accessing baited hooks
- The use of bird exclusion devices to prevent birds from accessing hooks whilst lines are being hauled
- Limitations on the release of fish offal overboard at the same time as setting and hauling of lines to avoid attracting seabirds: An additional requirement prohibits the dumping of all offal south of 60°S, the region where Antarctic toothfish are caught
- Prohibition on the dumping of oil, plastic, garbage, food waste, poultry, eggs or eggshells, sewage, and ash by fishing vessels
- Prohibition of the use of plastic packaging bands on fishing vessels

Incidental mortality of seabirds as a result of fishing has fallen to near-zero levels in the CCAMLR convention area. No mortality of seabirds or marine mammals was recorded as a result of fishing for Antarctic toothfish in 2011–12 and only two seabirds (southern giant petrels Macronectes giganteus) have been killed as a result of fishing in the Ross Sea since 1996/97.

=== Compliance ===
Compliance measures adopted by CCAMLR apply to all Antarctic toothfish fisheries. These include:

- At-sea inspections of fishing vessels
- Vessel licensing
- Port inspections of fishing vessels
- Continuous reporting of fishing vessel positions via satellite-linked vessel monitoring systems
- Catch documentation scheme for toothfish, which tracks toothfish from the point of landing through to the final point of sale and requires verification and authorisation by government authorities at each step
- The requirement to carry two scientific observers on each licensed vessel – including one from a member state other than the vessel flag

=== Sustainability ===
In November 2010, the Marine Stewardship Council (MSC) certified the Ross Sea Antarctic toothfish fishery as a sustainable and well-managed fishery. The certification is contentious, with many conservation groups protesting the certification due to the paucity of information needed to reliably manage the fishery, and that only eight of the 19 vessels in the fishery during the latest year for which data are publicly available were certified. During the 2013–14 season, vessels operating under the Marine Stewardship Certification landed 51.3% of all Antarctic toothfish from the Ross Sea Region (CCAMLR Subarea 88.1) and 64.7% of Antarctic toothfish from the Amundsen Sea sector (CCAMLR Subarea 88.2).

The argument that only a portion of Antarctic toothfish is certified, the high price it commands, and the remote areas where a large proportion of the fish are caught have been advanced as an encouragement to illegal, unreported, and unregulated (IUU) fishing and mislabeling. A 2011 genetic study of MSC-labeled Antarctic toothfish found in markets revealed a significant proportion was not from the MSC-certified stock, and many were not toothfish at all. The MSC had conducted its own internal study, which found no evidence of mislabeling. The MSC conducts an annual audit of the fishery which includes sampling of certified product.

Due to the challenges that faced toothfish management in the 1990s and early 2000s (e.g., IUU fishing, mislabeling, and inadequate data for management), consumer seafood guides such as Seafood Watch placed toothfish of both species (Chilean seabass) on their red, or "avoid", list; however, in light of up-to-date, internationally peer-reviewed scientific information, in April 2013, Seafood Watch upgraded the Ross Sea Antarctic toothfish fishery to a "good alternative". Following a comprehensive review in 2012, the Monterey Bay Aquarium revised its rating of Antarctic toothfish to 'good alternative'.

Greenpeace International added the Antarctic toothfish to its seafood red list in 2010. This approach is at variance with the high score given the fishery when it was granted certification by the MSC.
