= Public holidays in South Georgia and the South Sandwich Islands =

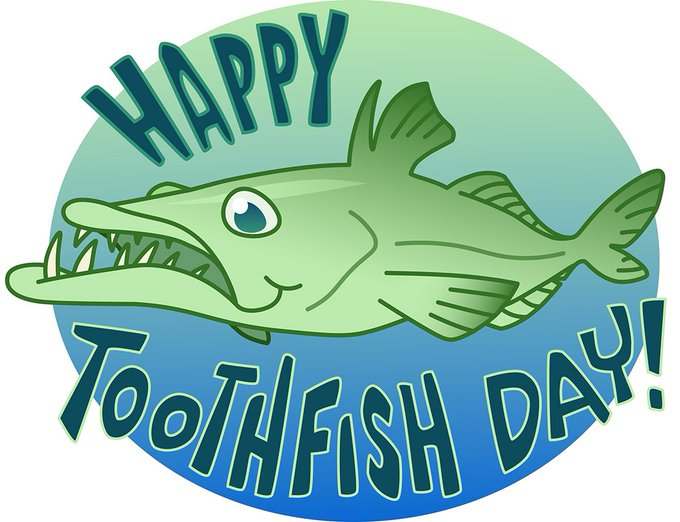
a Happy Toothfish Day greeting illustrated by artist Ole Comoll

This is a list of public holidays in South Georgia and the South Sandwich Islands.

| Date | Holiday | Remarks |
|---|---|---|
| January 1 | New Year's Day | |
| January 17 | Possession Day | In remembrance of Captain James Cook took possession of the islands for Britain in 1775. |
| movable holiday | Good Friday | |
| movable holiday | Easter Monday | |
| A Saturday in April | King's Birthday | |
| April 25 | Liberation Day | Liberated from Argentina in the Falklands War, 1982. |
| May 20 | Shackleton Day | |
| movable holiday | Midwinter Day | |
| September 4 | Toothfish Day | |
| December 25 | Christmas Day | |
| December 26 | Boxing Day | |
