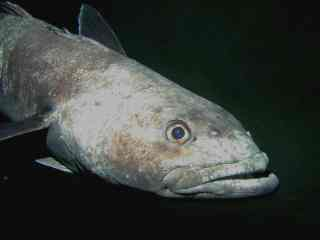
- Head of Antarctic toothfish (Dissostichus mawsoni) in McMurdo Sound

Scientific classification
- Kingdom: Animalia
- Phylum: Chordata
- Class: Actinopterygii
- Order: Perciformes
- Suborder: Notothenioidei
- Family: Nototheniidae; Günther, 1861

Genera
- see text

= Nototheniidae =

Cod icefishes

Family of fishes

In some scientific literature, the term "cod icefish" is used to identify members of this family. This should not be confused with the term "icefish," which refers to the "white-blooded" fishes of the family Channichthyidae. See Icefish (disambiguation).

Nototheniidae, the notothens or cod icefishes, is a family of ray-finned fishes, part of the suborder Notothenioidei which is traditionally placed within the order Perciformes. They are largely found in the Southern Ocean.

== Taxonomy ==
Nototheniidae was described as a family in 1861 by the German-born British ichthyologist Albert Günther with the type genus being Notothenia which had been described in 1844 by Sir John Richardson with the species Notothenia coriiceps which Richardson had also described in 1844 subsequently being designated as the type in 1862 by Theodore Nicholas Gill. The name Notothenia means "coming from the south", a reference to the Antarctic distribution of the genus. They are traditionally placed in the order Perciformes together with their relatives, Actual phylogenetic relationships among species of suborder Notothenioidei have not yet been determined with certainty.

=== Genera ===
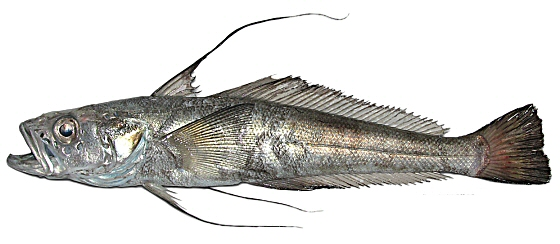
Longfin icedevil (Aethotaxis mitopteryx)

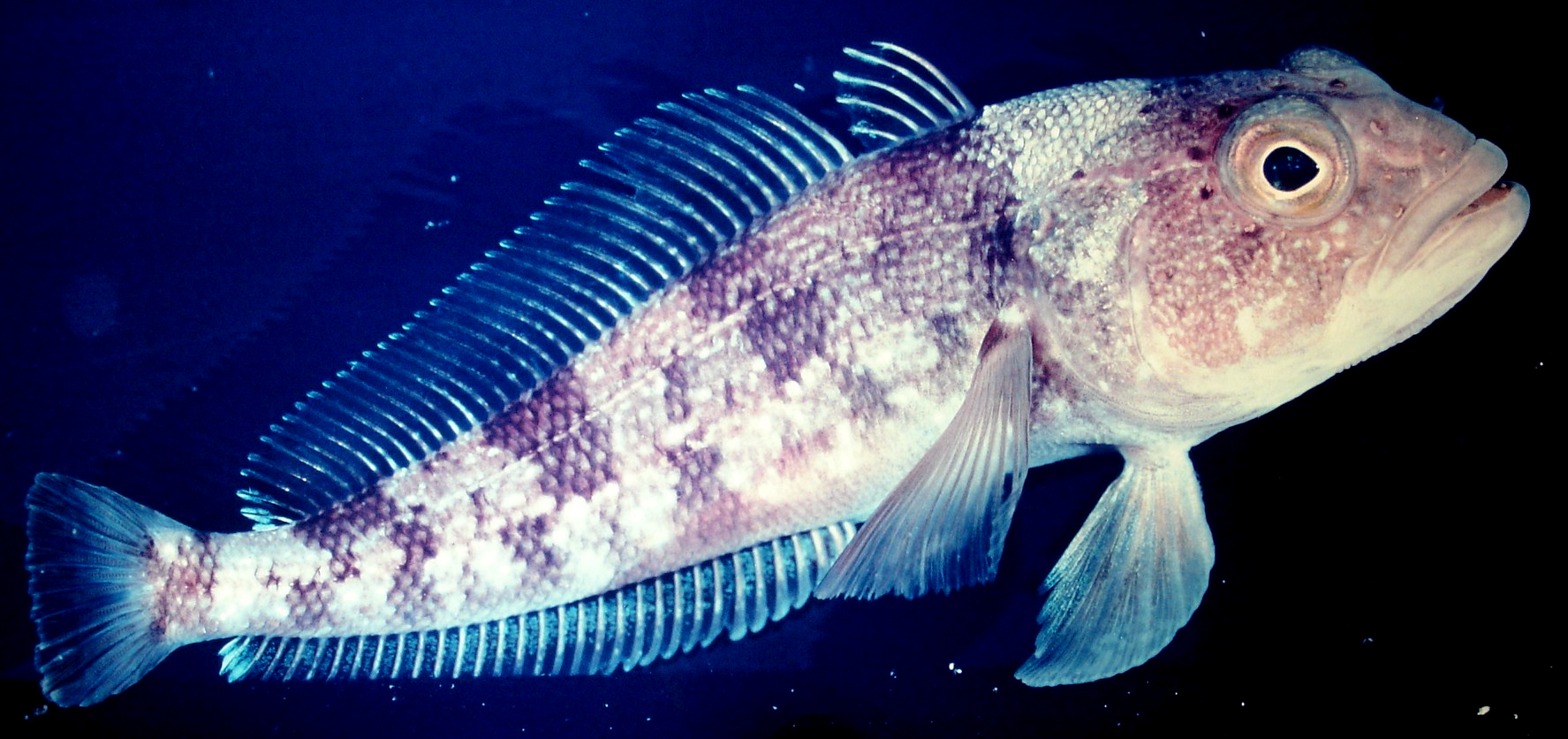
Emerald rockcod (Trematomus bernacchii)

The following subfamilies and genera are classified within the family Nototheniidae:

- Subfamily Pleuragrammatinae Andersen & Hureau 1979
  - Genus Aethotaxis H. H. DeWitt, 1962
  - Genus Dissostichus Smitt, 1898
  - Genus Gvozdarus Balushkin, 1989
  - Genus Pleuragramma Balushkin, 1982
- Subfamily Nototheniinae Günther 1861
  - Genus Gobionotothen Balushkin, 1976
  - Genus Indonotothenia Balushkin, 1984
  - Genus Lepidonotothen Balushkin, 1976
  - Genus Notothenia Richardson, 1844
  - Genus Nototheniops Balushkin, 1976 (=Lindbergichthys Balushkin, 1979)
  - Genus Paranotothenia Balushkin, 1976
  - Genus Patagonotothen Balushkin, 1976
- Subfamily Trematominae Balushkin,1982
  - Genus Cryothenia Daniels, 1981
  - Genus Pagothenia Nichols & La Monte, 1936
  - Genus Pseudotrematomus Balushkin, 1982
  - Genus Trematomus Boulenger, 1902

== Characteristics ==
Nototheniidae fishes have fusiform or elongate and oblong bodies. They typically have two dorsal fins, the first having 3 to 11 spines and the second having 25–42 segmented fin rays. The anal fin is similar to the second dorsal fin and has 22 to 40 segmented rays. All but the last dorsal and anal fin rays are branched. The caudal fin is rounded to forked and the pectoral fins are large. The mouth is terminal and may be horizontal or angled with a protrusible upper jaw. There are no teeth on the roof of the mouth. in most species there are no spines on the preoperculum or operculum. Any scales are usually ctenoid although the spinules may be reduced or absent. They have between 1 and 3 lateral lines. They vary in size from. Total length of 11 cm (4.3 in) in Patagonotothen cornucola to 215 cm (85 in) in the Patagonian toothfish (Dissostichus eleginoides).

== Distribution and habitat ==
Nototheniidae species are largely found in the Southern Ocean and are particularly abundant off the shores of Antarctica. As the dominant Antarctic fish taxa, they occupy both sea-bottom and water-column ecological niches.

Nototheniidae is a family of teleost fishes found mainly in the Southern Ocean, surrounding the continent of Antarctica. The family comprises about 50 species of fish that are adapted to living in the cold, nutrient-rich waters of the Southern Ocean. The Nototheniidae family includes some of the most ecologically and evolutionarily important fish in the Antarctic ecosystem, making them a crucial subject for scientific study.

Nototheniidae is a family of perciform fish that are primarily found in the Southern Ocean surrounding Antarctica, with some species also occurring in the sub-Antarctic regions of the southern hemisphere. They are known for their unique adaptations to the cold, such as the ability to produce antifreeze proteins to prevent their bodily fluids from freezing. The family includes over 100 species, making it the most diverse group of fish in the Southern Ocean. Nototheniidae inhabits a variety of habitats, from shallow coastal waters to deep ocean trenches. Many species are bottom-dwellers and can be found in rocky areas or on the seafloor, while others are pelagic and swim in the water column. Some species migrate seasonally to different habitats for feeding or spawning purposes. Due to their abundance in the Southern Ocean, Nototheniidae is an important part of the food chain for many marine predators, including seals, whales, and birds.

== Biology ==
Nototheniidae species have no swim bladder, however, they have other depth-related adaptations, such as increased fatty tissues and reduced mineralization of the bones, resulting in a body density approaching neutral, to fill a variety of niches. The spleen may be used to remove ice crystals from circulating blood. As the chilly Antarctic and sub-Antarctic waters of the Southern Ocean average −1 to 4 °C (30–39 °F), most species of these regions produce antifreeze glycoproteins to prevent the formation of ice crystals in blood and other body fluids.

The concentration of antifreeze glycoproteins can vary with differing environmental conditions, such as colder environments caused by location. Larger amounts of the proteins have been found in species with habitats in higher latitudes, due to the higher expression of the protein and longer degradation time compared to relatives in more temperate regions, portraying flexible temperature regulation.

Some species exhibit polymorphism, for example, the circum-Antarctic Trematomus newnesi exists as two morphs in the Ross Sea, the typical morph and a large-mouthed/broad-headed morph.

== Fisheries ==
Nototheniidae species are the major fish resource in the Southern Ocean, many notothens are under increasing pressure from commercial fishing, particularly the Patagonian toothfish and the Antarctic toothfish.
