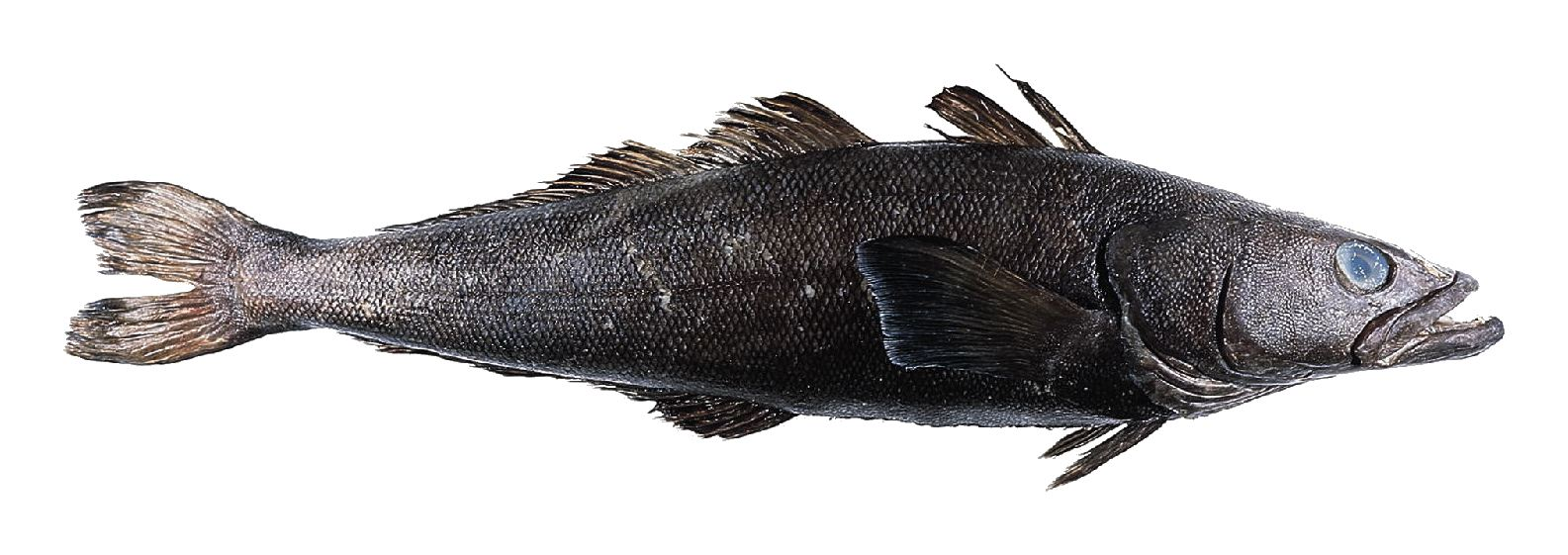

Scientific classification
- Kingdom: Animalia
- Phylum: Chordata
- Class: Actinopterygii
- Division: Teleostei
- Order: Perciformes
- Family: Nototheniidae
- Genus: Dissostichus
- Species: D. eleginoides

Binomial name
- Dissostichus eleginoides Smitt, 1898

Synonyms
- Macrias amissus T. N. Gill & C. H. Townsend, 1901; Dissostichus amissus (T. N. Gill & C. H. Townsend, 1901)

= Patagonian toothfish =

Species of fish

The Patagonian toothfish (Dissostichus eleginoides), also known as Chilean sea bass and mero, is a species of notothen found in cold waters (1–4 °C or 34–39 °F) between depths of 45 and 3,850 m (150 and 12,630 ft) in the southern Atlantic, Pacific, and Indian Oceans and Southern Ocean on seamounts and continental shelves around most Subantarctic islands.

The average weight of a commercially caught Patagonian toothfish is 7–10 kg (15–22 lb), depending on the fishery, with large adults occasionally exceeding 100 kg (220 lb). They are thought to live up to 50 years and to reach a length up to 2.3 m (7.5 ft). Several commercial fisheries exist for Patagonian toothfish, which are detailed below.

A close relative, the Antarctic toothfish (Dissostichus mawsoni), is found farther south around the edges of the Antarctic shelf, and a Marine Stewardship Council-certified fishery is active in the Ross Sea; it is also sometimes marketed as Chilean sea bass.

== Taxonomy ==
The Patagonian toothfish was first formally described in 1898 by the Swedish zoologist Fredrik Adam Smitt with the type locality given as Puerto Toro at 55°24'S, 68°17'W on the Chilean part of Tierra del Fuego. Smitt also described the new genus Dissostichus for this new species, meaning that the Patagonian toothfish is the type species of this genus by monotypy. The specific name eleginoides means having the form of, i.e. having a similar shape to, Eleginops.

== Description ==
The Patagonian toothfish has a streamlined, fusiform body that has a depth that fits into its standard length 5 to 6.4 times. It has a flattened head with a wide, flat area between the eyes. The snout is longer than the diameter of the eyes. The mouth is large, extending past the middle of the eye. There are two rows of teeth in the upper jaw, the teeth in the outer row being the larger and canine-like. The lower jaw has a row of spaced canine-like teeth. Additional canine-like teeth are found outside the teeth rows at the joint of the upper and lower jaws. There are two lateral lines; both made up of tubed scales, an upper one and another along the mid flanks. The upper lateral line has 88–104 scales while the lower line has 61–77 scales. The first dorsal fin has 8 to 10 spines; the second dorsal fin has 28 to 30 soft rays, while the anal fin also has 28–30 soft rays. The caudal fin is emarginate. The pectoral fins are large and shaped like fans. The head and body are covered in ctenoid scales except for the front of the head. This species attains a maximum total length of 215 cm (85 in) although 70 cm (28 in) is more typical, and a maximum published weight of 200 kg (440 lb). The overall colour is brownish-grey with darker blotches.

== Distribution and habitat ==
The Patagonian toothfish is found in the southeastern Pacific and southwestern Atlantic Oceans. It occurs in southern Chile around the coast of Patagonia, in Argentina, and the Falkland Islands. It has also been recorded at Macquarie Island in the southwestern Pacific Ocean and the Southern Ocean at South Georgia and from the sub-Antarctic islands and seamounts of the Indian Sector. There is a single record of a vagrant from the Davis Strait in the northwestern Atlantic Ocean off Greenland, it is thought that this individual migrated over 10,000 km (6,200 mi) and that it transited across the tropical areas in deep, cold regions of the ocean. The juveniles are semi-pelagic, becoming demersal at depths between 150 and 400 m (490 and 1,310 ft). Adults move to deeper habitats, being found at depths in excess of 1,000 m (3,300 ft).

== Biology ==
Patagonian toothfish spawn in deep water (around 1,000 m) during the austral winter, producing pelagic eggs and larvae. Larvae switch to a demersal habitat at around 100 m (1 year old) and inhabit relatively shallow water (<300 m) until 6–7 years of age, when they begin a gradual migration into deeper water. As juveniles in shallow water, toothfish are primarily piscivorous, consuming the most abundant, suitably sized local prey. With increasing size and habitat depth, the diet diversifies and includes more scavenging of squid, fish, and crustaceans. In turn, toothfish constitute a small part of the diets of sperm whales, southern elephant seals, and colossal squid.

As most toothfish fisheries are managed in accordance with Commission for the Conservation of Antarctic Marine Living Resources (CCAMLR) regulations and conservation measures, CCAMLR adopts an "ecosystem approach", which requires that all other living resources of the Southern Ocean are treated as an integrated system where effects on predator, prey, and related species are considered, and decisions on sustainable harvesting levels are made based on sound, internationally peer-reviewed scientific advice.

== Fisheries and fisheries management ==
=== Commercial name ===
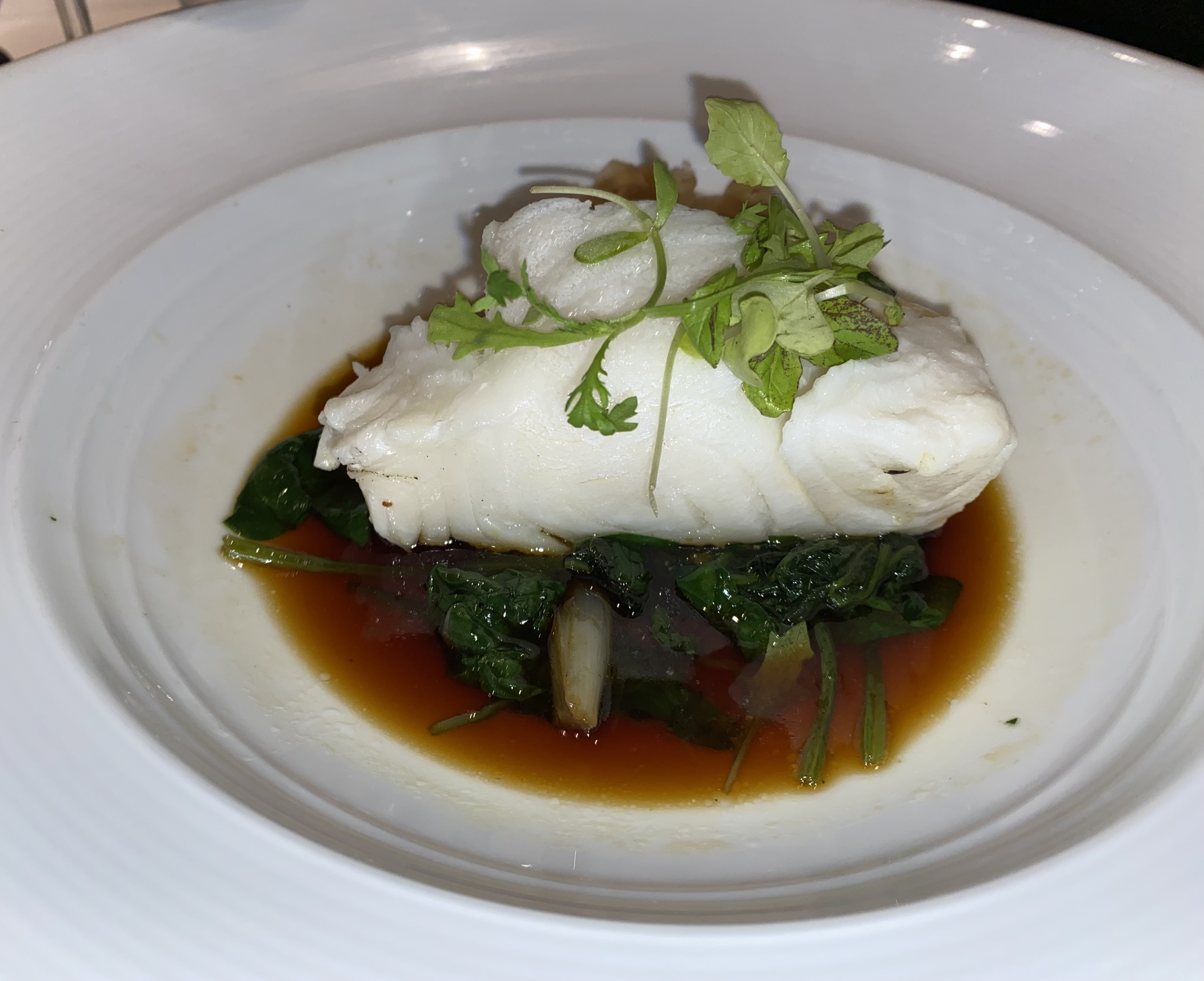
Chilean sea bass cooked "Hong Kong" style from Eddie V's in Fort Lauderdale, FL

The Patagonian and the Antarctic toothfishes are sometimes sold under the culinary name "Chilean sea bass" in the United States and Canada.

The name "Chilean sea bass" was invented by a fish wholesaler named Lee Lantz in 1977. He was looking for a name to make it attractive to the American market. He considered "Pacific sea bass" and "South American sea bass" before settling on "Chilean sea bass". In 1994, the U.S. Food and Drug Administration accepted "Chilean sea bass" as an "alternative market name" for Patagonian toothfish, and in 2013 for Antarctic toothfish.

In the UK, the approved commercial designations for D. eleginoides and D. mawsoni are "icefish" and "toothfish". This has created some confusion, as a genuine "icefish" (Champsocephalus gunnari) caught in subantarctic waters does not resemble toothfish in any way.

In Singapore, the Patagonian toothfish is marketed as a type of cod fish.

=== Management ===
Commercial fishing of toothfish is managed by the CCAMLR inside the CCAMLR Convention Area, which spans the Antarctic continent and waters between the 45th and 60th parallels south. Some fisheries inside territorial waters within the convention area (e.g. Crozet, Prince Edward, and Marion Islands) are managed separately by countries with territorial waters taking CCAMLR management practices into account. Toothfish fisheries outside the CCAMLR Convention Area in the coastal waters of Argentina, Chile, and Uruguay are managed by the relevant coastal state. However, these fisheries are still subject to the CCAMLR Catch Documentation Scheme, which tracks the trade of toothfish from the point of unloading to the point of final consumption.

In the legal toothfish fisheries managed by CCAMLR and countries with territorial waters, the most common method is fishing by longlines (where a long "mainline" is set in the water, with many baited hooks coming off that line). A small quantity of toothfish is caught by trawling (where a net is towed behind the boat for short periods). For all methods of legal fishing for toothfish, the interactions with, and risks to, seabirds are minimal. This is a result of requirements for legal operators to use mitigation devices or approaches, such as:

- Seasonal fishery closures during the summer due to increases in seabird abundance for chick rearing
- No setting of hooks during the daytime
- No fishing without having a bird-scaring line trailing out the back of the boat to keep birds away from the hooks
- Bird exclusion devices or "Brickle curtains" to be used on 100% of hauls
- Boats must use weighted longlines so that the baits and hooks sink before the birds can grab them;
- Limitations on release of offal overboard at the same time as the setting or hauling of lines (to avoid attracting seabirds when they may otherwise be vulnerable to the baits and hooks)

In 2011, the CCAMLR Scientific Committee Chair, David Agnew, was quoted as saying, "levels of seabird mortality are negligible in most areas", with the one region yet to achieve these "near zero" results, having reduced seabird interactions by over 98% from their peak levels, and have continued to improve each year. Nevertheless, interactions between the fishery and marine mammals such as sperm whales, orca, fur seals, and elephant seals are not uncommon and can be fatal.

Trawling generally catches toothfish in the smaller size range, which requires calculations to be made at the annual stock assessment meetings of CCAMLR to take these catches of smaller-sized fish into account, and lowers the overall available catch of toothfish by trawl. CCAMLR has prohibited all trawl fishing in high seas waters and exploratory fisheries.

=== Compliance ===
To minimize the risk of long-term adverse effects on target species, bycatch species, and marine ecosystems, CCAMLR uses several compliance systems to monitor fishing activities in the convention area. These include:

- Vessel licensing
- Monitoring of transhipments
- Vessel and port inspection systems
- Automated satellite-linked vessel-monitoring systems
- Catch document scheme (CDS): The scheme for Patagonian toothfish (Dissostichus eleginoides) and Antarctic toothfish (Dissostichus mawsoni) was one measure that ensured reductions in illegal fishing for toothfish and reduced the scope for trade in illegally caught fish. The CDS is an innovative online catch document information system (Dissostichus Catch Document) developed to identify legal toothfish harvested, which tracks toothfish from the point of landing throughout the trade cycle to the point of sale. The CDS requires verification and authorization by national authorities at regular intervals in the trade cycle. Identification of the origin of toothfish entering the ports and markets of CDS parties is essential.

=== Legal fishing ===
The Coalition of Legal Toothfish Operators, Inc. (COLTO) is a toothfish fishing industry group whose members represent around 80% of the legal toothfish catch worldwide. Seven of the fisheries that COLTO members fish are now independently certified by the Marine Stewardship Council (MSC) as sustainable and well-managed fisheries. Commercial fishing of Patagonian and Antarctic toothfish is managed by CCAMLR around most of the Subantarctic and Antarctic regions, but a fishery that lies within a nation's exclusive economic zone (EEZ) is managed by that nation, taking into account management recommendations and approaches by CCAMLR.

In 2004, the South Georgia toothfish fishery (CCAMLR Statistical Division 48.3) was the first toothfish fishery to be MSC-certified and was recertified in 2009 and 2014, as all MSC-certified fisheries must be audited annually and fully reassessed every five years. The South Georgia fishery is managed by the UK overseas territory of South Georgia and the South Sandwich Islands.

The Ross Sea fishery (CCAMLR Statistical Division 88.1 and 88.2) was the second toothfish fishery to be independently evaluated and certified by the MSC as sustainable and well-managed in 2010 and recertified in 2015. This fishery catches mainly Antarctic toothfish, a close relative of the Patagonian toothfish.

The Heard Island and McDonald Islands fishery (CCAMLR Statistical Division 58.5.2) was certified as a sustainable and well-managed fishery by the MSC in March 2012 (and recertified in 2017) and is operated under Australian jurisdiction in a manner consistent with CCAMLR regulations. Two Australian companies operate four vessels - Austral Fisheries and Australian Longline.

The Macquarie Island toothfish fishery is within the Australian EEZ and is situated outside the CCAMLR Convention Area within FAO Statistical Area 81, though it is managed in a complementary way with the conservation measures adopted by CCAMLR. In May 2012, this was the fourth toothfish fishery to gain MSC certification (and recertified in 2017). Two Australian companies are allocated quota in this fishery.

France regulates Patagonian toothfish in the waters surrounding the French islands in the South Indian Ocean, with scientific oversight from the National Museum of Natural History. These fisheries are located around the Kerguelen Islands (CCAMLR Statistical Division 58.5.1) and the Crozet Islands (CCAMLR Statistical Division 58.6). Six fishing companies based out of Reunion Island have been granted authorisations. The Kerguelen Island fishery was certified by the MSC in September 2013 (recertified in 2018) and the Crozet Islands fishery was certified by the MSC in 2017.

The Falkland Islands, a self-governing British Overseas Territory, also has a toothfish fishery and was awarded MSC certification in 2014. The Falklands do not fall in the CCAMLR Convention area, though regulations on fishing methods, science, and management mirror CCAMLR requirements. The Total Allowable Catch (TAC) is caught by a sole longline vessel.

Combined, over 50% of all legally harvested toothfish is independently assessed and certified by the MSC as being from sustainable and well-managed fisheries.

The Chilean toothfish fishery is separated into two separate fleets. The "artisanal fleet" of small boats operates in the region north of 47°S inside the Chilean EEZ, and six vessels from the "industrial fleet" operate south of 47°S inside the Chilean EEZ, as well as on the high seas both within and outside CCAMLR waters. The TAC for the industrial fleet is determined each year by the Chilean government based on biological studies carried out by both public and private, scientific bodies. Since 2006, artisanal fleet catches have fluctuated between 2,091t and 1,558t per annum.

The Argentine Federal Fisheries Council manages Argentina's toothfish fishery off its coastline under recommendations from the National Fisheries Research Institute. The Argentine TAC is caught by five vessels.

The Prince Edward and Marion Islands toothfish fishery is managed and regulated by Branch Fisheries, part of the South African Minister of Agriculture, Forestry, and Fisheries. The South African Marine Resource Authorities fully supports and follows all CCAMLR conservation measures. The TAC is fished by two vessels belonging to two fishing companies/cooperatives, with catches having been restricted significantly following excessive illegal, unreported, and unregulated (IUU) fishing in those waters in the late 1990s. TACs from this fishery have slowly started to increase as the stock begins to recover.

The global toothfish catch is around 30,000 tonnes, with around 80% of this coming from COLTO members and around half being independently certified as coming from sustainable and well-managed fisheries by the Marine Stewardship Council.

=== Illegal fishing ===
In the late 1990s to early 2000s, illegal, unreported and unregulated (IUU) fishing for toothfish nearly collapsed some fisheries in the Southern Ocean. However, since 2005, because of CCAMLR member nations, government patrol vessels, NGOs, media exposure, and trade and port state measures, IUU fishing has been all but eliminated from within countries' EEZs, and until 2015, a relatively small portion of IUU fishing still occurred in high seas areas. In 2014 and 2015, several major campaigns tried to eliminate IUU fishing for toothfish. This included the Sea Shepherd campaign, "Operation Icefish", which pursued one of the vessels, the Thunder, for 110 days before it was scuttled. Operations by the Royal New Zealand Navy, the Royal Australian Navy, Interpol, and governments of Spain, Thailand, Malaysia, and Indonesia all combined to successfully apprehend, arrest and prosecute all of the remaining 6 IUU vessels fishing illegally for toothfish on the high seas.

At the peak of IUU fishing, illegal catches were estimated to be 32,000 tonnes in 1997, with about 55 vessels believed to be active. By 2010, IUU catches had fallen to an estimated 1,615 tonnes, all taken in high-seas areas, with just four IUU fishing vessels reported to be active. This decreased IUU fishing by over 95% since the mid-1990s. CCAMLR estimated in 2012 that 90% of IUU catches at the time were of Antarctic toothfish, not Patagonian toothfish.

CCAMLR annually reviews information on IUU fishing activities in the convention area and has established a contracting party and a noncontracting party IUU vessel list (CCAMLR Conservation Measure 10-06 and Conservation Measure 10–07). Vessels included on the IUU lists have engaged in IUU activities in the convention area and undermined the effectiveness of conservation measures, thereby threatening toothfish stocks, marine habitats, and bycatch species. Vessels are included on the IUU vessel lists after a consensus decision based on set criteria from the commission. This measure, combined with additional surveillance by member nations' catch documentation schemes, has played a significant part in the reduction of IUU fishing for toothfish.

In the past, France sold some fishing rights to Japanese and other foreign fisheries, but because of IUU fishing, rights are now reserved for French fishers based at Réunion Island. Because of the previous poaching, the French Navy and Australian Customs vessels still work in concert, patrolling both French and Australian EEZs, having made numerous arrests and seizures in the late 1990s to early 2000s. An Australian Customs vessel, the Southern Supporter, was involved in the renowned chase and apprehension of an IUU vessel in the 2003 Viarsa incident that stretched over 7,200 km.

TACs for legal operators in CCAMLR are set, taking into account the estimated IUU catches from past years and any IUU activity that may be occurring in the different fisheries. In some fisheries, this has meant a considerable reduction in legal catches – an example of this is the Australian Heard Island and McDonald Islands fishery, where the legal TAC was 3,800 t in 1996/97. This was dropped to a minimum of 2,427 t by 2006/07, with a substantial portion of that decline attributed to the IUU catches taken from the fishery between 1996 and 2002. Since then, no IUU fishing has occurred in that fishery, and the legal TAC has steadily increased.

In addition to the catch documentation system mentioned above, USA regulations do not allow toothfish imports without valid Dissostichus catch documents; dealer permits and preapproval certificates must be issued in advance by NOAA. In addition, toothfish must be caught from vessels equipped with satellite-linked automated VMSs that track vessel movements from port to port to ensure compliance with set quotas and boundaries. All vessel VMS data must be reported to the centralized CCAMLR system, with confirmation to USA required that it has occurred, for any products from those boats to be imported into the United States.

As revealed by the "black spider memos", Charles, Prince of Wales, was worried about the future for the species. An open reply noted that sea birds had been protected in toothfish fisheries globally and that IUU fishing was virtually eliminated.

The EU has also imposed requirements against IUU fishing that include:

- Only marine fisheries products validated as legal by the relevant flag state or exporting state can be imported or exported from the EU.
- A European blacklist covers IUU vessels and states that turn a blind eye to illegal fishing activities.
- EU operators who fish illegally anywhere in the world, under any flag, face substantial penalties proportionate to the economic value of their catch, which deprive them of any profit.

=== Seafood chooser organizations ===
Patagonian toothfish is listed by the Monterey Bay Aquarium on its Seafood Watch list and pocket guides. In April 2013, Seafood Watch produced an updated report, indicating new ratings for some fisheries, which allocates about 78% of toothfish caught worldwide, which are:

- Best Choice – Heard Island and McDonald Islands Fishery (Australia), Macquarie Island Fishery (Australia), Falkland Islands Fishery
- Good Alternative – South Georgia Fishery, Kerguelen Islands Fishery (France), Ross Sea Antarctic toothfish Fishery
- Avoid – Prince Edward & Marion Island Fishery (South Africa), Chile, Crozet Islands Fishery (France)
- Not Rated – Argentina

In 2010, Greenpeace International added the Patagonian toothfish to its seafood red list. "The Greenpeace International seafood red list is a list of fish that are commonly sold in supermarkets around the world, and which have a very high risk of being sourced from unsustainable fisheries." Greenpeace have not updated their rating of toothfish since the 2013 Monterey Bay Aquarium review.

== See also ==
- Toothfish Day
