= D'Urville Sea =

Marginal sea off East Antarctica

- Location within Antarctica
- Location: Antarctica
- Coordinates: 65°00′S 140°00′E
- Type: Sea
- Part of: Southern Ocean
- Managing agency: France
- Surface elevation: 0 m (0 ft)

D'Urville Sea in Eastern Antarctica.

D'Urville Sea or Dumont-d'Urville Sea is a sea of the Southern Ocean, north of the coast of Adélie Land, East Antarctica. It is named after the French explorer and officer Jules Dumont d'Urville.
