= Fredrik Adam Smitt =

Swedish zoologist (1839–1904)

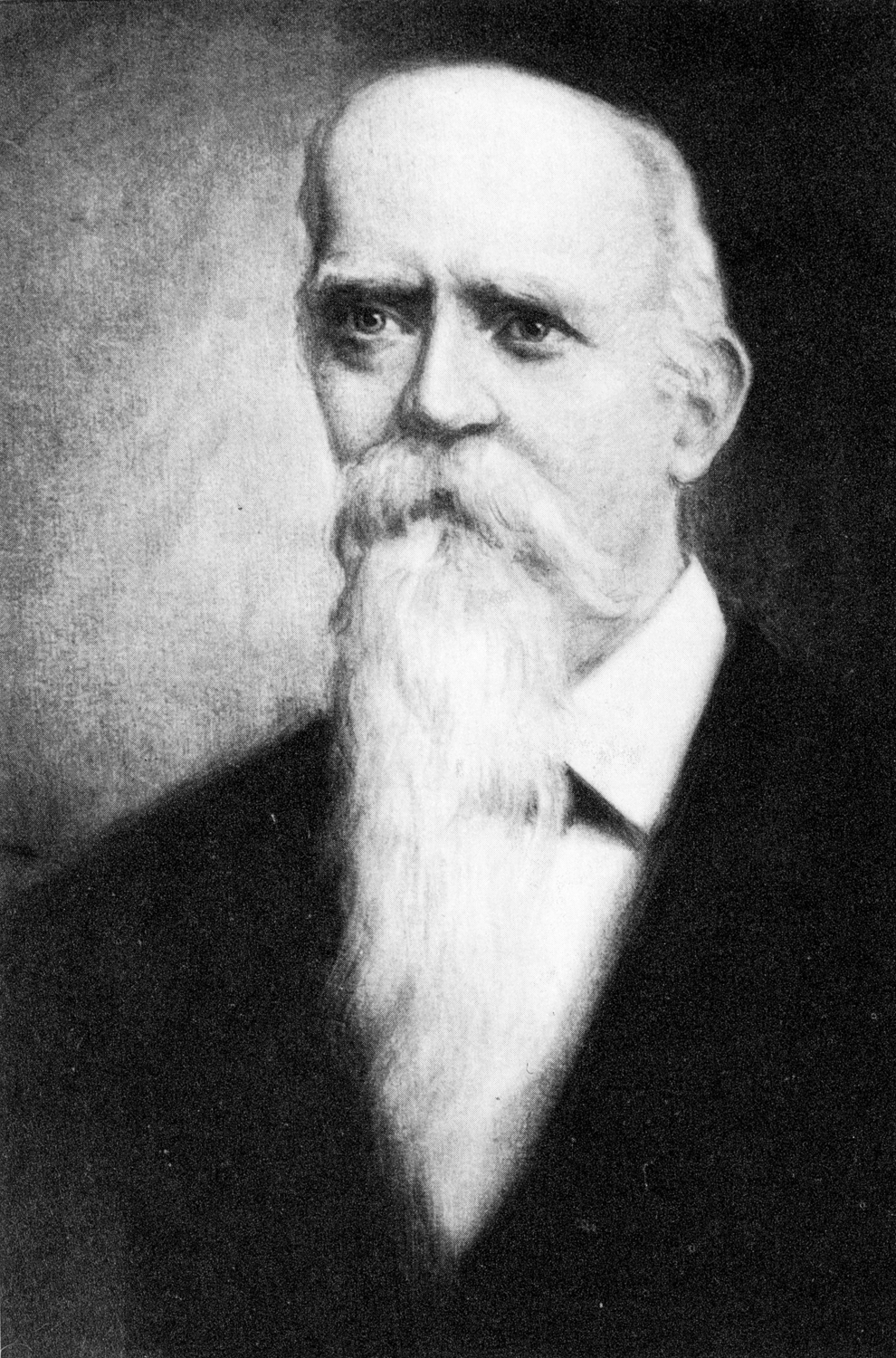
Fredrik Adam Smitt,

Fredrik Adam Smitt (9 May 1839 in Halmstad – 19 February 1904 in Stockholm) was a Swedish zoologist.

== Biography ==
Smitt studied in Lund and Uppsala where he received his doctorate in 1863. In 1861 and 1868 He participated in the Swedish expeditions to Svalbard. In 1871 he was appointed professor at the Swedish Museum of Natural History, where he was in charge of the Department of Vertebrates. From 1879 he also taught zoology at Stockholm University.

Smitt produced both popular works and many scientific papers. Besides his scientific work, Smitt also championed the modernization of the techniques herring fisheries.

== Taxon described by him ==
- See Category:Taxa named by Fredrik Adam Smitt

== Selected works ==
- Ur högre djurens utvecklingshistoria (1876)
- Ryggradsdjurens geologiska utveckling och slägtskapsförhållanden (1882)
- Kritisk förteckning öfver i Riksmuseum befintliga salmonider (1886)
- Skandinaviens fiskar, revised edition (1892)
- A history of Scandinavian fishes (1892)
