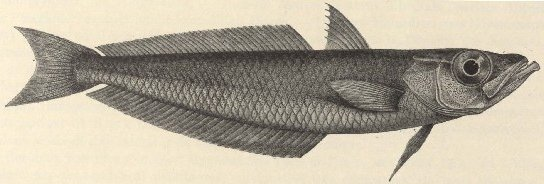

Conservation status
- Least Concern (IUCN 3.1)

Scientific classification
- Kingdom: Animalia
- Phylum: Chordata
- Class: Actinopterygii
- Division: Teleostei
- Order: Perciformes
- Family: Nototheniidae
- Genus: Pleuragramma; Boulenger, 1902
- Species: P. antarcticum

Binomial name
- Pleuragramma antarcticum Boulenger, 1902

= Antarctic silverfish =

Species of fish

The Antarctic silverfish (Pleuragramma antarcticum), or Antarctic herring, is a species of marine ray-finned fish belonging to the family Nototheniidae, the notothens or cod icefishes. It is native to the Southern Ocean and the only truly pelagic fish in the waters near Antarctica. It is a keystone species in the ecosystem of the Southern Ocean.

== Response to changing temperatures ==
While widely distributed around the Antarctic, the species appears to have largely disappeared from the western side of the northern Antarctic Peninsula, based on a 2010 research cruise funded by the National Science Foundation under the US Antarctic Program. Due to climate change, the rising water temperatures in the Antarctic Peninsula cause this decline in Antarctic Silverfish abundance by interfering with psychological adaptations and spawning behaviors in ice. Additionally, Antarctic Silverfish mortality rates spike after only a 5°C increase in water temperature, due to the presence of antifreeze glycoproteins in their blood, a common adaptation of Nototheniidae to survive in freezing waters.

=== Food Chain ===
The decline in Antarctic Silverfish abundance causes great disruption in the Western Antarctic Peninsula's food web. They are a high-caloric prey species to many other arctic species including larger fish, penguins, and large marine mammals, making up a significant percentage of those species diets. Antarctic Silverfish also help with regulation of the Antarctic trophic system by feeding on a wide variety of primary producers, encouraging a shift in primary production to upper trophic levels.

== Taxonomy ==
The Antarctic silverfish was first formally described in 1902 by the Belgian-born British zoologist George Albert Boulenger with the type locality given as Victoria Land in Antarctica. It is the only species in the monotypic genus Pleuagramma which was also described by Boulenger. Some authorities place this taxon in the subfamily Pleuragrammatinae, but the 5th edition of Fishes of the World does not include subfamilies in the Nototheniidae. The genus name is a compound of pleuro meaning "side" with a which means "without" and gramma meaning "line", an allusion to the absence of a lateral line.

== Description ==
Antarctic silverfish usually grow to about 15 cm (5.9 in) in length, with a maximum of 25 cm (9.8 in). The maximum reported weight of this species is 200 g. Antarctic silverfish have a maximum reported age of 20 years. When alive, they are pink with a silver tint, but turn silver only after death. All the fins are pale. The dorsal side is slightly darker. This Antarctic marine fish is one of several in the region that produce antifreeze glycopeptides as an adaptation against the extreme cold of Antarctic waters.

== Reproduction and ecology ==
Female Antarctic Silverfish release their eggs into sea ice along the Antarctic Peninsula to await fertilization. Antarctic Silverfish migrate in schools to seek out areas of high sea ice abundance; this forage determines spawning season. It usually occurs between the late winter months and early spring, and larvae hatching occurs around November-December. Each life stage of the Antarctic Silverfish occurs at different levels of the water columns, moving deeper as they mature. An exception is the move closer to surface level between the larval stage and metamorphosis occurring at 2-3 years old. The postlarvae, 8–17 mm (0.31–0.67 in) in size, feed on eggs of calanoids (Calanoida), sea snails Limacina and tintinnids (Tintinnida). Juveniles feed on copepods (Copepoda), mostly on Oncaea curvata and can be found at depths of 50 to 400 m (160–1,310 ft), while adults can be found at depths 0–728 m (0–2,388 ft). As their size increases, so does the size of their prey items. The age of sexual maturation of the Antarctic Silverfish is 6+ years, adults being the most abundant over the Ross Ice Shelf.
