= List of non-avian biota of Heard Island and McDonald Islands =

The following non-avian biota have been observed on and around Heard Island and the adjacent McDonald Islands, which are part of the same Australian territory. For the list of birds, see List of birds of Heard and McDonald Islands.

Included on this list are seven species of mammal, 23 taxa of fish, 25 species of terrestrial arthropods, one land snail, one flowering plant, and one species of kelp.

== Mammals ==
Scientific name	Authority	Common name
Arctophoca gazella	(Peters, 1875)	Antarctic fur seal
Arctophoca tropicalis	(Gray, 1872)	Subantarctic fur seal
Balaenoptera physalus	(Linnaeus, 1758)	Fin whale
Delphinidae sp.	Gray, 1821	Dolphin sp.
Hydrurga leptonyx	(Blainville, 1820)	Leopard seal
Mirounga leonina	(Linnaeus, 1758)	Southern elephant seal
Physeter macrocephalus	(Linnaeus, 1758)	Sperm whale

== Fish ==
Scientific name	Authority	Common name
Bathyraja eatonii	(Günther, 1876)	Eaton's skate
Bathyraja irrasa	(Hureau and Ozouf-Costaz, 1980)	Kerguelen sandpaper skate
Bathyraja murrayi	(Günther, 1880)	Murray's skate
Champsocephalus gunnari	Lönnberg	Mackerel icefish
Channichthys rhinoceratus	(Richardson, 1844)	Unicorn icefish
Dissostichus eleginoides	(Smitt, 1898)	Patagonian toothfish
Electrona antarctica	(Günther, 1878)	Lanternfish
Electrona carlsbergi	(Tanning, 1932)	Lanternfish
Gobionotothen acuta	Günther	Triangular rockcod
Gymnoscopelus braueri	(Lönnberg, 1905)	Lanternfish
Gymnoscopelus nicholsi	(Gilbert, 1911)	Nichol's lanternfish
Gymnoscopelus opisthopterus	(Fraser-Brunner, 1949)	Lanternfish
Krefftichthys anderssoni	(Lönnberg, 1905)	Lanternfish
Lepidonotothen mizops	(Günther, 1880)	Toad rockcod
Lepidonotothen squamifrons	Günther	Grey rockcod
Muraenolepis sp.		Moray cod
Notolepis coatsi	(Dollo, 1908)	Antarctic jonasfish
Notothenia coriiceps	(Richardson, 1844)	Black rockcod
Notothenia rossii	(Richardson, 1844)	Marbled rockcod
Nototheniidae sp.		Icefish
Paradiplospinus gracilis	Brauer	Snake mackerel
Protomyctophum bolini	(Fraser-Brunner, 1949)	Lanternfish
Zanclorhynchus spinifer	Günther	Horsefish

== Terrestrial arthropods ==
Scientific name	Authority	Common name
Alaskozetes antarcticus		Mite
Amalopteryx maritima		True fly
Anatalanta aptera		True fly
Antarctonesiotes gracilipes		Beetle
Calycopteryx mosleyi minor (variation)		True fly
Calycopteryx mosleyi mosleyi		True fly
Canonopsis sericeus sericeus		Beetle
Cryptopygus antarcticus		Antarctic springtail
Ctenolepisma longicaudata		Bristle-tail
Ectemnorrhinus (s. str.) crassipes		Beetle
Ectemnorrhinus (s. str.) jelbarti		Beetle
Ectemnorrhinus forbesi		Beetle
Ectemnorrhinus hoseasoni		Beetle
Embryonopsis halticella		Moth
Globoppia intermedia	Hammer	Mite
Halozetes marinus	(Lohmann)	Mite
Ixodes kerguelensis		Tick
Meropathus chuni		Weevils
Notiopsylla kerguelensis		Flea
Parapsyllus magellanicus heardi		Flea
Parisotoma octooculata		Springtail
Pringleophaga heardensis		Clothes moth
Tineola bisiella		Clothes moth
Tullbergia antarctica	(Lubbock, 1876)	Springtail
Tullbergia bisetosa	(Borner, 1903)	Springtail
Tullbergia templei	Wise, 1970	Springtail

== Terrestrial mollusk ==
Scientific name	Authority	Common name
Notodiscus hookeri		Subantarctic land snail

== Flowering plant ==
Scientific name	Authority	Common name
Azorella selago		Cushion plant

== Marine algae ==
Scientific name	Authority	Common name
Kelp species		kelp

== See also ==
- Antarctic realm
- Fauna of Heard Island and McDonald Islands
