= Astrid Andreasen =

Faroese artist and illustrator

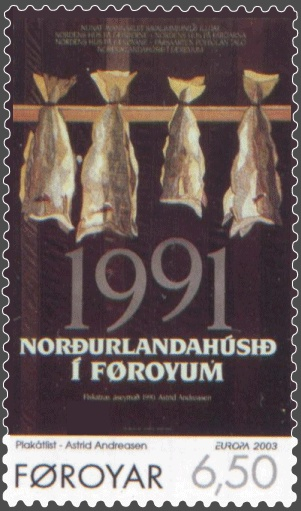
Faroe stamp 440 fish tree.

Astrid Jóhanna Andreasen (born 31 July 1948 in Vestmanna, Faroe Islands) is a Faroese artist, illustrator and postage stamp designer. As a scientific illustrator, she specialises in marine animals.

== Biography ==
Andreasen grew up in Vestmanna, as the daughter of Andreas Andreasen (1906–1974), a teacher, and Daniella Andreasen, a housewife. Early in her career she produced illustrations for collections of her father's poetry. From 1968 to 1970 she studied at a vocational school in Kerteminde in Denmark to become a teacher of embroidery. In 1974 she studied to become an occupational therapist in Hellerup. In the 1970s she took a job as a therapist in Tórshavn hospital where she worked with mentally handicapped people, teaching them embroidery and other art forms.

From 1984 to 1986, Andreasen learned illustration and weaving at the Academy of Arts in Århus, and from 1990 to 1991 she specialized in scientific illustration at the Gerlesborg School of Fine Art as well as at the Tjärnö Marine Biological Laboratory.

Andreasen worked from 1999 until 2016 as a scientific illustrator at the National Museum of the Faroe Islands. She has gained international recognition through her illustrations for Postverk Føroya. As an artist she is especially known for her textile art works, which are held by the collection of the National Gallery of the Faroe Islands. Together with her daughter Katrin (born 1971), she produced the altarpiece of the Vestmanna church, a Tree of Life made out of wood and metal.

In 2018, Andreasen was awarded the Faroese Award of honor.

== Stamps ==
=== Fish ===
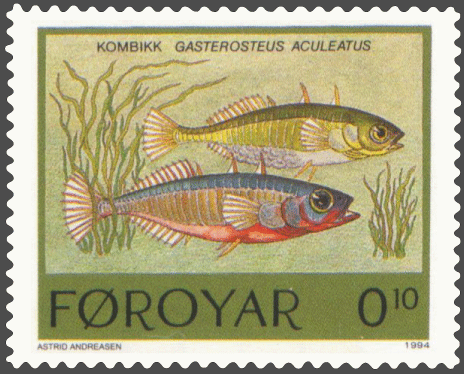
FR 248 of 1994: Kombikk - stickleback (Gasterosteus aculeatus)

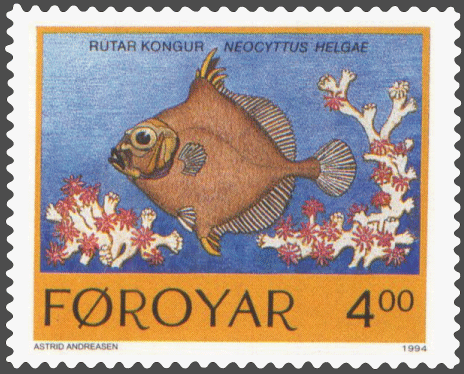
FR 249: Rútar kongur - false boarfish (Neocyttus helgae)

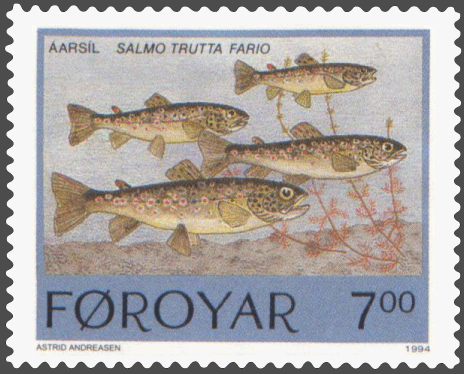
FR 250: Áarsíl - brown trout (Salmo trutta fario)

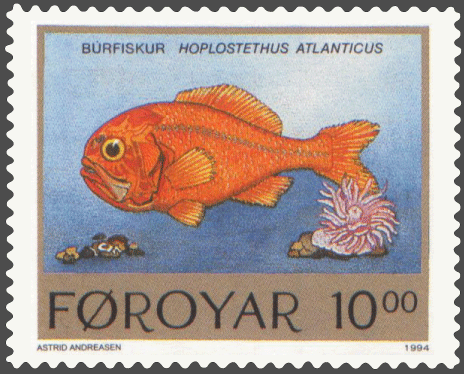
FR 251: Búrfiskur - orange roughy (Hoplostethus atlanticus)

=== Leafhoppers ===
Date of issue: 6 February 1995

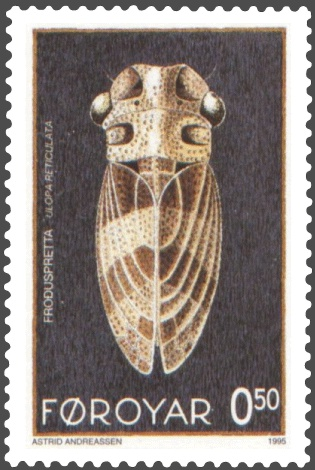
FR 264: Ulopa reticulata

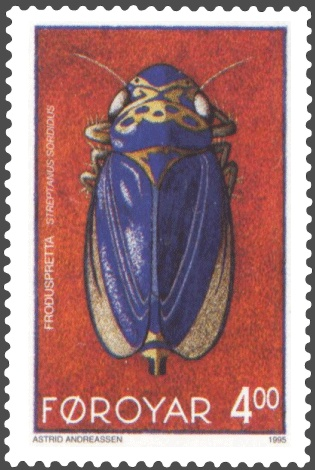
FR 265: Streptanus sordidus

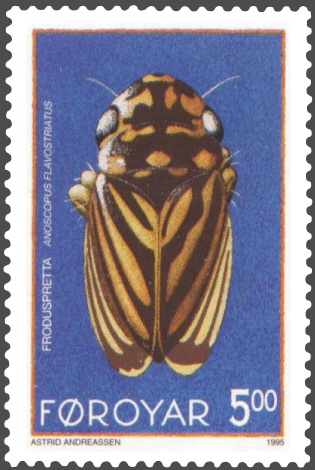
FR 266: Anoscopus flavostriatus

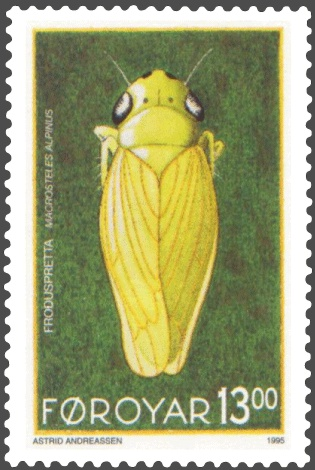
FR 267: Macrosteles alpinus

=== Raven ===
Date of issue: 12 June 1995.

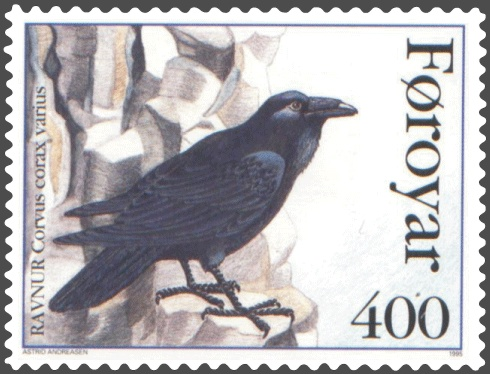
FR 275: North Atlantic raven (Corvus corax varius)

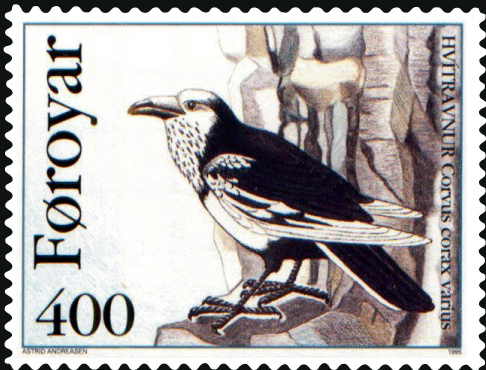
FR 276: Pied raven (Corvus corax varius morpha leucophaeus)

=== Invasion birds ===
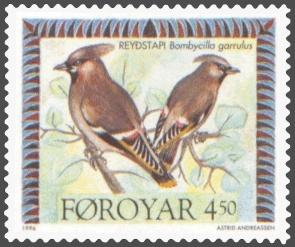
FR 290: Waxwing (Bombycilla garrulus)

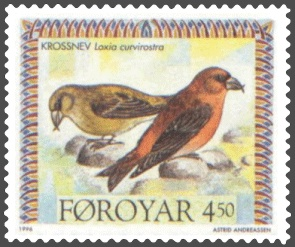
FR 291: Common crossbill (Loxia curvirostra)

=== Mushrooms of the Faroes ===
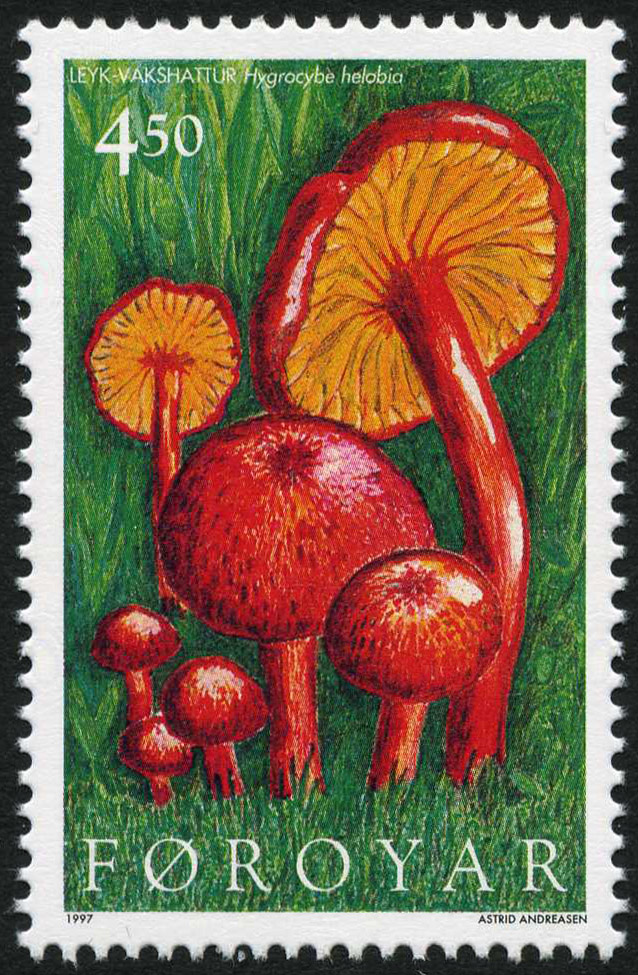
FR 303: Leyk-vakshattur (Hygrocybe helobia)

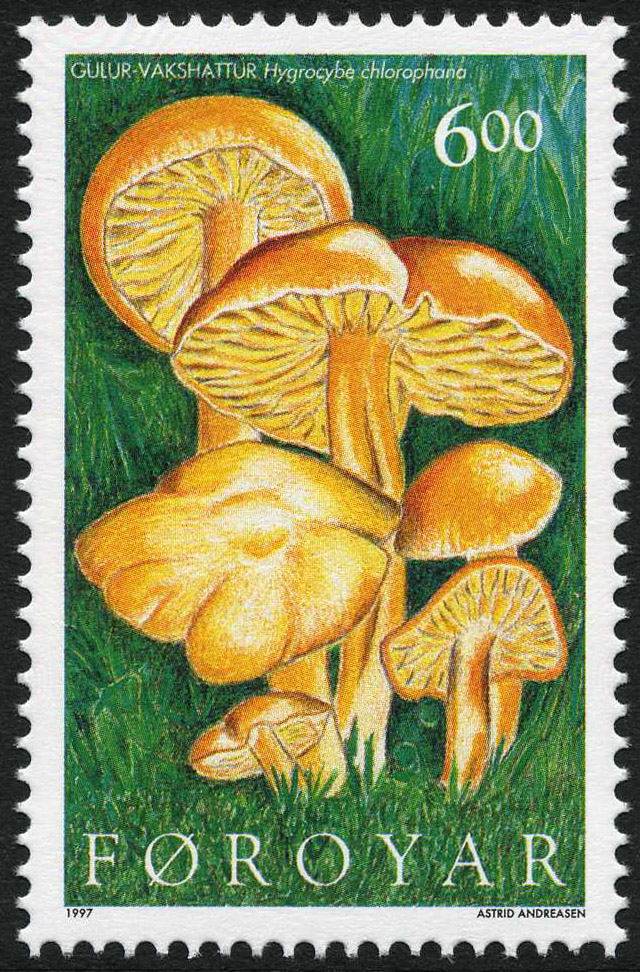
FR 304: Gulur vakshattur (Hygrocybe chlorophana)

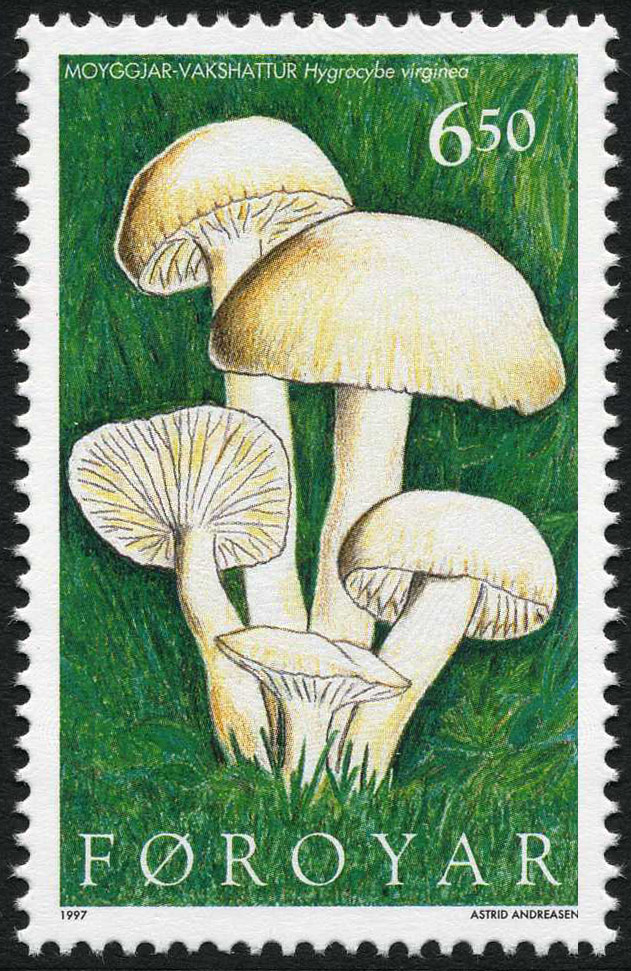
FR 305: Moyggjar-vakshattur (Hygrocybe virginiae)

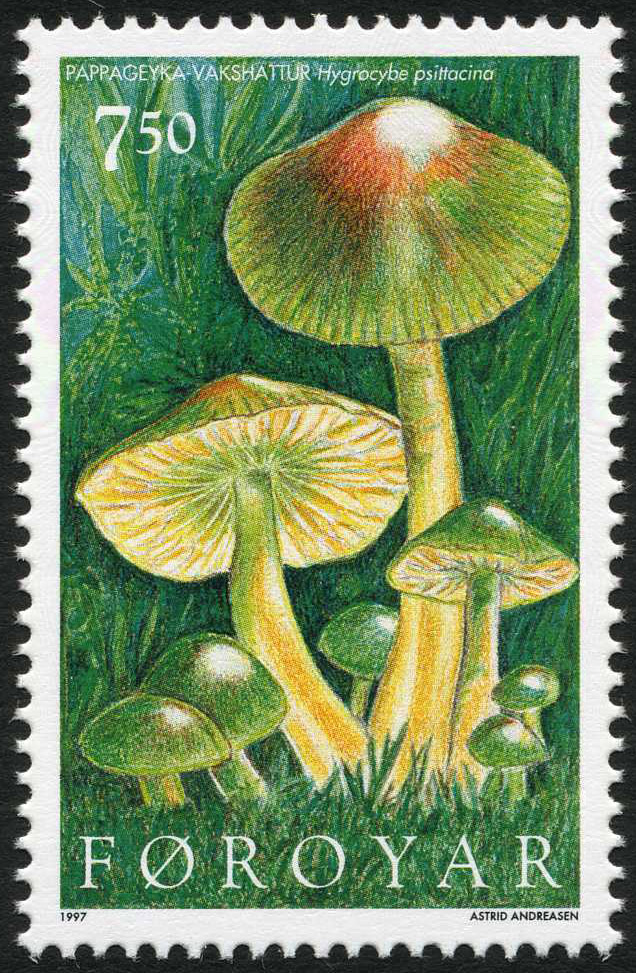
FR 306: Papageyka-vakshattur (Hygrocybe psittacina)

=== Invasion Birds '97 ===
Date of issue: 17 February 1997.

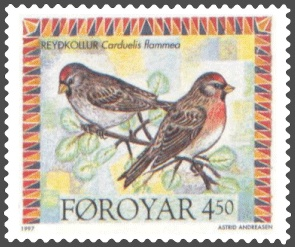
FR 307: Reyðkollur - redpoll (Carduelis flammea)

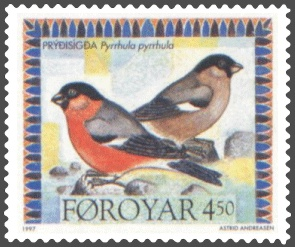
FR 308: Prýðisígda - bullfinch (Pyrrhula pyrrhula)

=== Sedentary Birds I ===
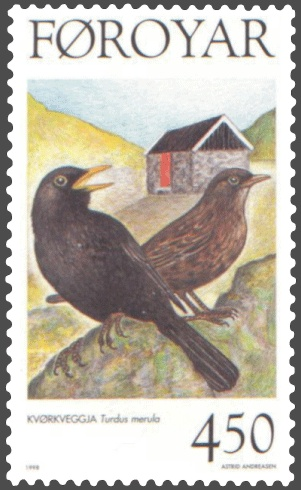
FR 324: Blackbird (Turdus merula)

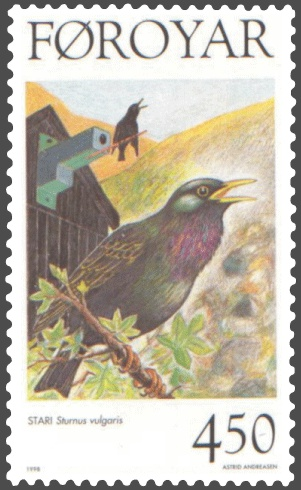
FR 325: Starling (Sturnus vulgaris faeroensis)

=== Sedentary Birds II ===
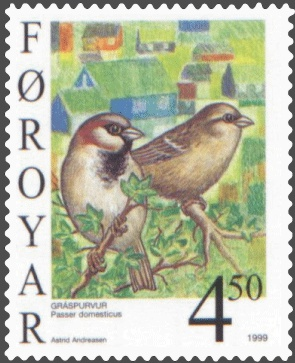
FR 344: House sparrow (Passer domesticus)

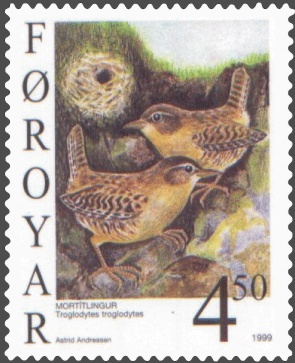
FR 345: Wren (Troglodytes troglodytes)

=== Molluscs ===
Date of issue: 11 February 2002

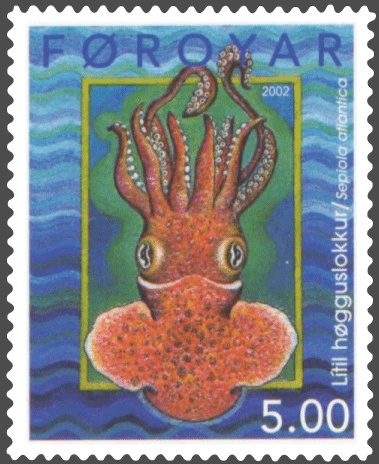
FO 409: Lítli høgguslokkur (Sepiola atlantica) ten armed squid

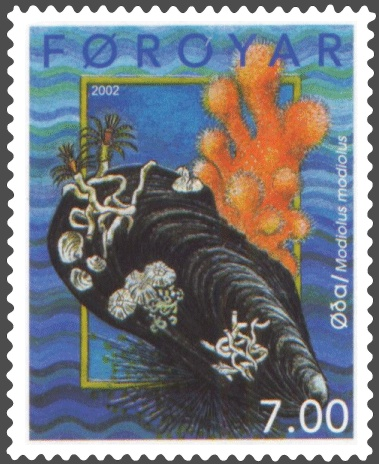
FO 410: Øða (Modiolus modiolus) horse mussel

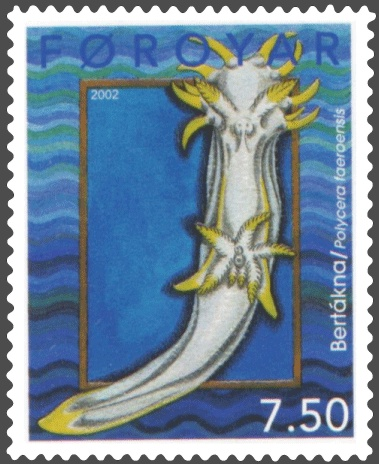
FO 411: Bertákna (Polycera faeroensis) sea slug - a species, which got its name from the Faroes

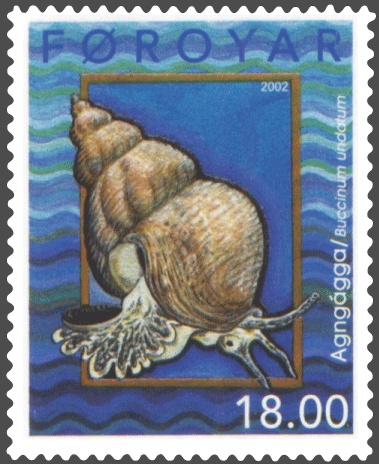
FO 412: Agngágga (Buccinum undatum) common northern welk

Text on stamps.fo

- [ Molluscs]

=== Art on posters ===
Date of issue: 14 April 2003

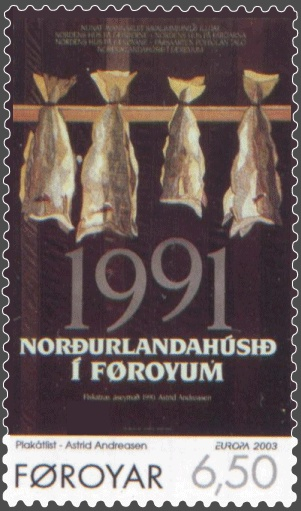
FO 440: Fish tree

=== Storm Petrel ===
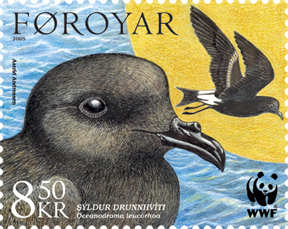
FO 522: Leach's petrel (Oceanodroma leuchorhoa)

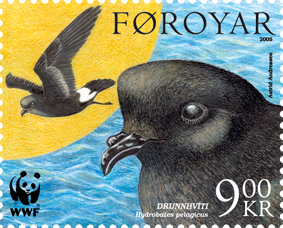
FO 523: Storm petrel (Hydrobates pelagicus)

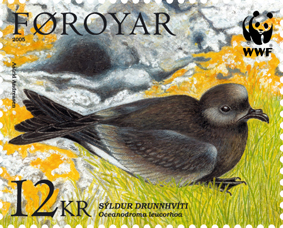
FO 524: Leach's petrel (Oceanodroma leucorrhoa)

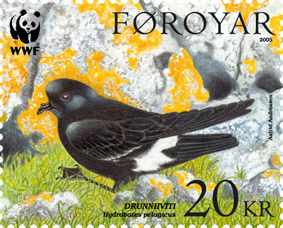
FO 525: Storm petrel (Hydrobates pelagicus)

=== Deepwater Fishes ===
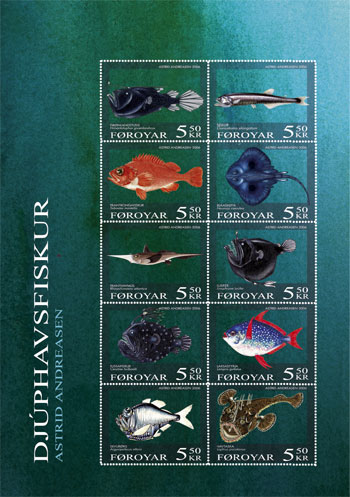
FO 539-548: Deepwater fishes

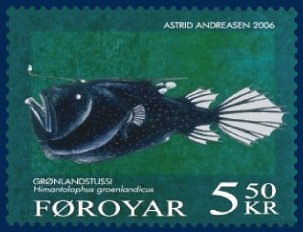
FO 539: Grønlandstussi - Atlantic footballfish (Himantolophus groenlandicus)

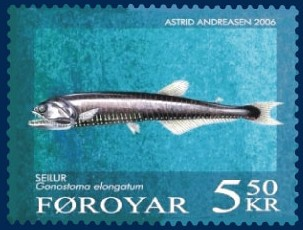
FO 540: Seilur - elongated bristlemouth (Gonostoma elongatum)

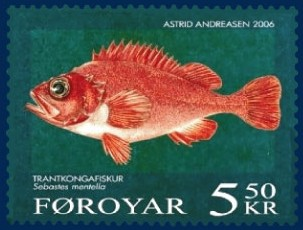
FO 541: Trantakongafiskur - deepwater redfish (Sebastes mentella)

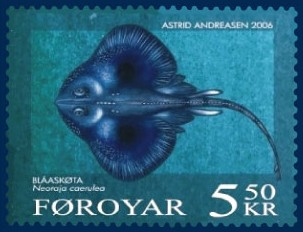
FO 542: Bláaskøta - Blu-ray (Neoraja caerulea)

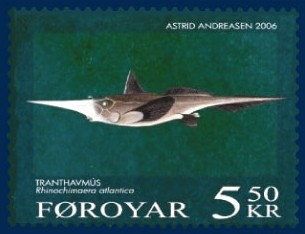
FO 543: Tranthavmús - straightnose rabbitfish (rhinochimaera atlantica)

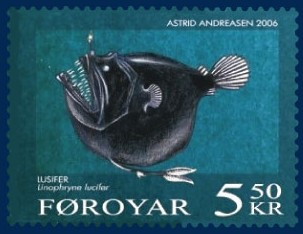
FO 544: Lusifer (Linophryne lucifera)

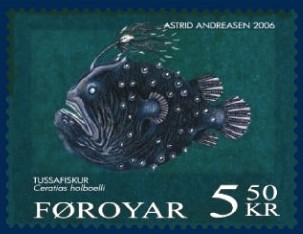
FO 545: Tussafiskur - deep-sea angler (Ceratias holboelli)

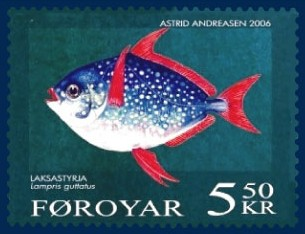
FO 546: Laksastyrja - moonfish (Lampris guttatus)

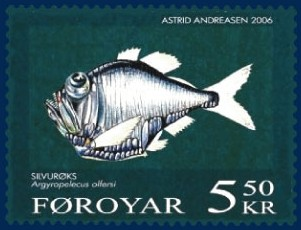
FO 547: Silvurøks - hatchet fish (Argyropelecus olfersi)

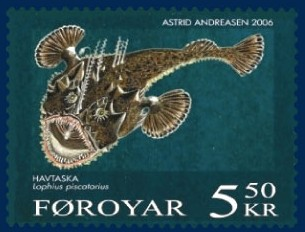
FO 548: Havtaska - anglerfish (Lophius piscatorius)

== Other works ==
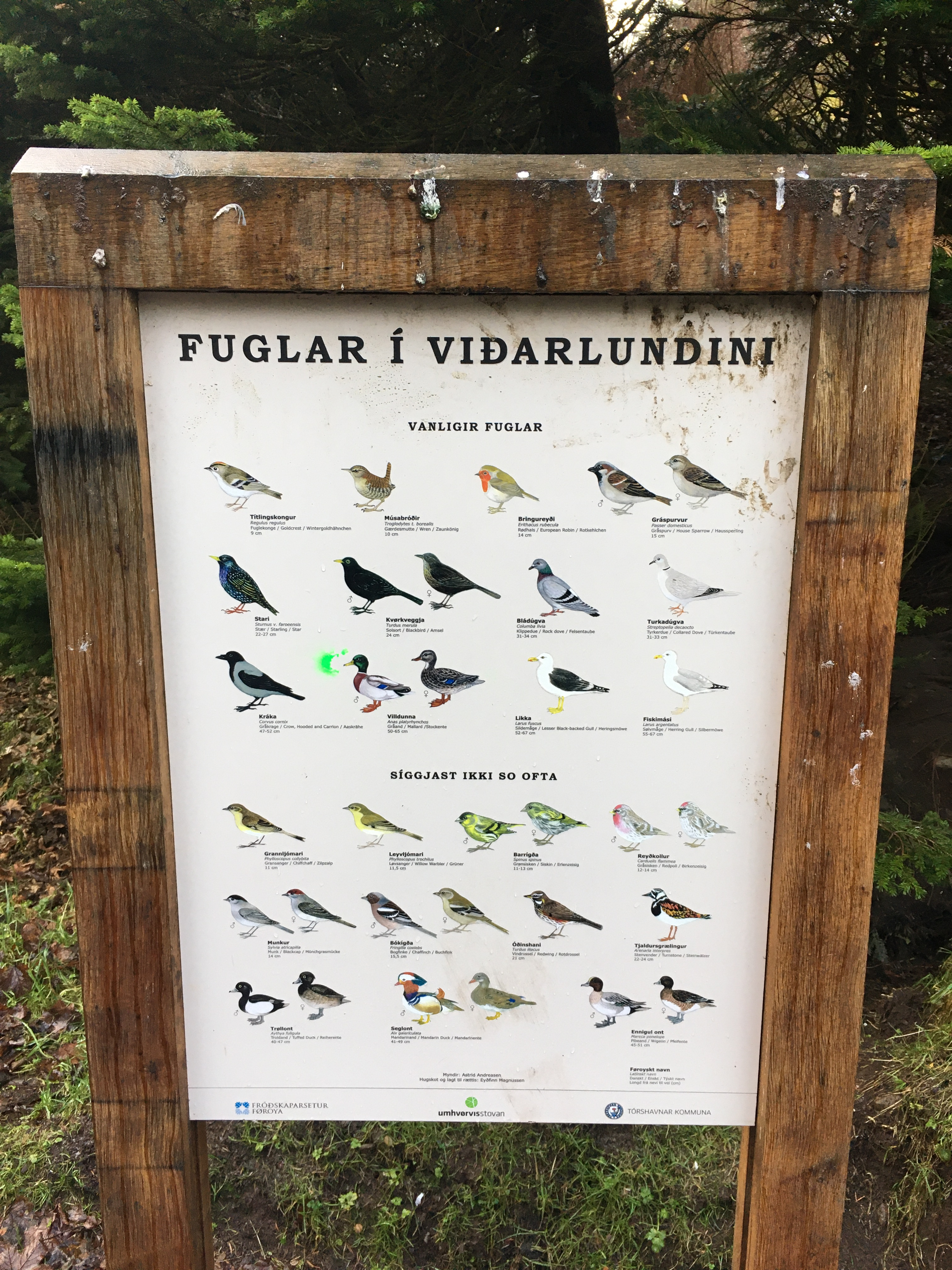
Information sign about the birdlife of Viðarlundin park in Tórshavn
