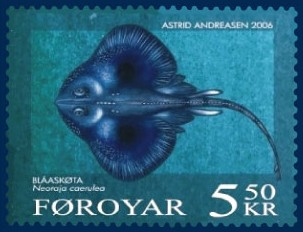
- Neoraja caerulea on a Faeroese stamp

Scientific classification
- Kingdom: Animalia
- Phylum: Chordata
- Class: Chondrichthyes
- Subclass: Elasmobranchii
- Order: Rajiformes
- Family: Rajidae
- Genus: Neoraja; McEachran & Compagno, 1982

Type species
- Breviraja caerulea Stehmann, 1976

= Neoraja =

Genus of cartilaginous fishes

Neoraja is a genus of fish in the family Rajidae found in the Atlantic Ocean. These small, deep-water skates all reach a total length of approximately 30 centimetres (12 in).

== Species ==
- Neoraja africana (Stehmann & Séret, 1983) (West African pygmy skate)
- Neoraja caerulea (Stehmann, 1976) (Blue ray)
- Neoraja carolinensis McEachran & Stehmann, 1984 (Carolina pygmy skate)
- Neoraja iberica Stehmann, Séret, M. E. Costa & Baro, 2008 (Iberian pygmy skate)
- Neoraja stehmanni (Hulley, 1972) (African pygmy skate)
