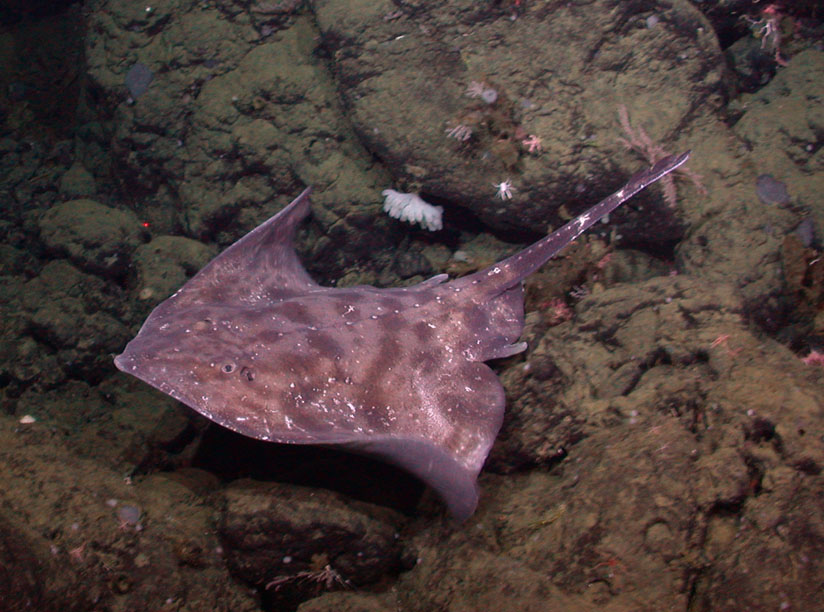
- Broad skate (A. badia)

Scientific classification
- Kingdom: Animalia
- Phylum: Chordata
- Class: Chondrichthyes
- Subclass: Elasmobranchii
- Order: Rajiformes
- Family: Rajidae
- Genus: Amblyraja; Malm, 1877

Type species
- Raja radiata Donovan, 1808

= Amblyraja =

Genus of cartilaginous fishes

Amblyraja is a genus of skates that primarily are found in the Atlantic, but species also occur in the East and North Pacific, the Arabian Sea, the sub-Antarctic, and off Southern Australia and New Zealand.

== Species ==
Nine recognized species are placed in this genus:

- Amblyraja badia (Garman, 1899) (Broad skate)
- Amblyraja doellojuradoi (Pozzi, 1935) (Southern thorny skate)
- Amblyraja frerichsi (G. Krefft, 1968) (Thickbody skate)
- Amblyraja georgiana (Norman, 1938) (Antarctic starry skate)
- Amblyraja hyperborea (Collett, 1879) (Arctic skate)
- Amblyraja jenseni (Bigelow & Schroeder, 1950) (Shorttail skate)
- Amblyraja radiata (Donovan, 1808) (Thorny skate)
- Amblyraja reversa (Lloyd, 1906) (Reversed skate)
- Amblyraja taaf (E. E. Meisner, 1987) (Whiteleg skate)

Synonyms

- Amblyraja badia (Garman, 1899) accepted as Amblyraja hyperborea (broad skate)
- Amblyraja robertsi (Hulley, 1970) accepted as Amblyraja hyperborea (bigmouth skate)
