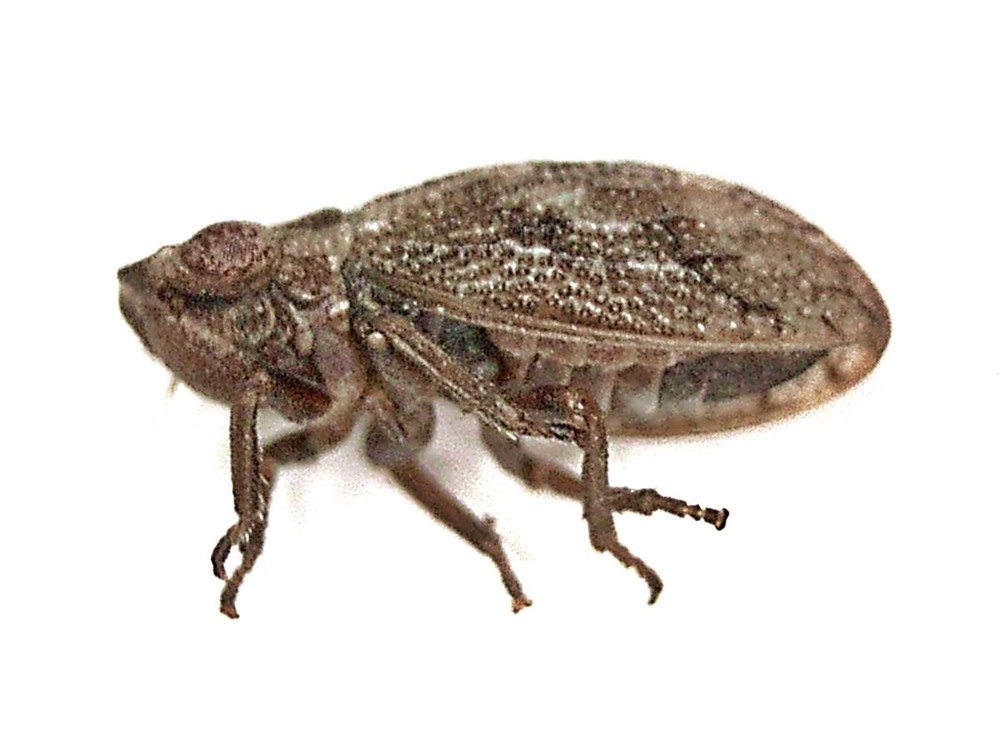
- Ulopa reticulata

Scientific classification
- Kingdom: Animalia
- Phylum: Arthropoda
- Class: Insecta
- Order: Hemiptera
- Suborder: Auchenorrhyncha
- Family: Cicadellidae
- Subfamily: Ulopinae
- Tribe: Ulopini
- Genus: Ulopa; Fallén, 1814

= Ulopa =

Genus of true bugs

Ulopa is a genus of insects, belonging to the family Cicadellidae.

The genus was described in 1814 by Carl Fredrik Fallén.

Species are found in Europe.

== Species ==
The World Auchenorrhyncha Database includes:

1. Ulopa carneae Wagner, 1955
2. Ulopa reticulata Fabricius, 1794

Note: Ulopa brunneus Singh-Pruthi, 1930 is a synonym of Daimachus exemplificatus Distant, 1916
