= Metelectrona =

Scientific classification
- Domain: Eukaryota
- Kingdom: Animalia
- Phylum: Chordata
- Class: Actinopterygii
- Order: Myctophiformes
- Family: Myctophidae
- Genus: Metelectrona; Wisner, 1963

Genus of fishes

Metelectrona is a genus of lanternfishes.

== Species ==
There are currently three recognized species in this genus:

- Metelectrona ahlstromi Wisner, 1963
- Metelectrona herwigi Hulley, 1981 (Herwig's lanternfish)
- Metelectrona ventralis (Becker, 1963) (Flaccid lanternfish)
