= Protomyctophum normani =

Scientific classification
- Kingdom: Animalia
- Phylum: Chordata
- Class: Actinopterygii
- Order: Myctophiformes
- Family: Myctophidae
- Genus: Protomyctophum
- Species: P. normani

Binomial name
- Protomyctophum normani Tåning, 1932

Species of fish

Protomyctophum normani is a species of lanternfish.
