= Flaccid lanternfish =

Scientific classification
- Domain: Eukaryota
- Kingdom: Animalia
- Phylum: Chordata
- Class: Actinopterygii
- Order: Myctophiformes
- Family: Myctophidae
- Genus: Metelectrona
- Species: M. ventralis

Binomial name
- Metelectrona ventralis Becker, 1963

Synonyms
- Electrona ventralis Becker, 1963

Species of fish

The flaccid lanternfish (Metelectrona ventralis) is a species of oceanodromous lanternfish that has a lifespan of up to two years. It has been found in stomachs of Champsocephalus gunnari and Dissostichus eleginoides.

== Distribution/habitat ==
It is a bathypelagic species, living in waters from 0 to 426 m (0 to 1,398 ft) deep, and may rise to the surface at 350 m (1,150 ft) at night.

== Description ==
It reaches a length of up to 10.7 cm (4.2 in), and has 13 to 15 dorsal soft rays, and 20 to 22 anal soft rays.
