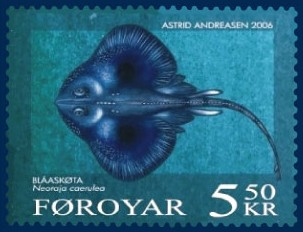
- Faeroese stamp with illustration of Neoraja caerulea by Astrid Andreasen.

Conservation status
- Least Concern (IUCN 3.1)

Scientific classification
- Kingdom: Animalia
- Phylum: Chordata
- Class: Chondrichthyes
- Subclass: Elasmobranchii
- Order: Rajiformes
- Family: Rajidae
- Genus: Neoraja
- Species: N. caerulea

Binomial name
- Neoraja caerulea (Stehmann, 1976)

Synonyms
- Breviraja caerulea

= Neoraja caerulea =

Species of fish

Neoraja caerulea, also known as the blue ray or blue pygmy skate, is a species of fish in the family Rajidae. This small ray reaches a total length of approximately 30 centimetres (12 in) and is endemic to the north-eastern Atlantic Ocean off Ireland and Iceland, and south to the Bay of Biscay.

== Description ==
N. caerulea has a maxiumum total length of 35 centimetres (14 in). Its dorsal surface is coarse and has a violet to bluish colouration, though it has specimens have occasionally been found which are cloudy greyish-brown in colour. The disc's ventral surface is smooth and centrally white with brown blotches and blackish to dark brown-violet disc margins. The tail and trunk has a pale grey colouration and has between 6-9 dark bands, while its underside is pale and covered in dense prickles. The tail is thin and longer than the disc. Adult males have both alar and malar thorns. The blue pigmy skate has up to 12 orbital thorns, as well as a median row of 33-58 small-sized thorns which occur along its trunk and tail. Its snout has a filamentous tip and is short and blunt. The upper and lower jaws have 47-55 rows.

== Distribution and habitat ==
It occurs at depths of 600 to 1,262 metres (1,969 to 4,140 ft). N. caerulea has been found in water temperatures between 6.4–9.1 °C (43.5–48.4 °F).

== Biology ==
N. caerulea eats small benthic invertebrates. It is oviparous.
