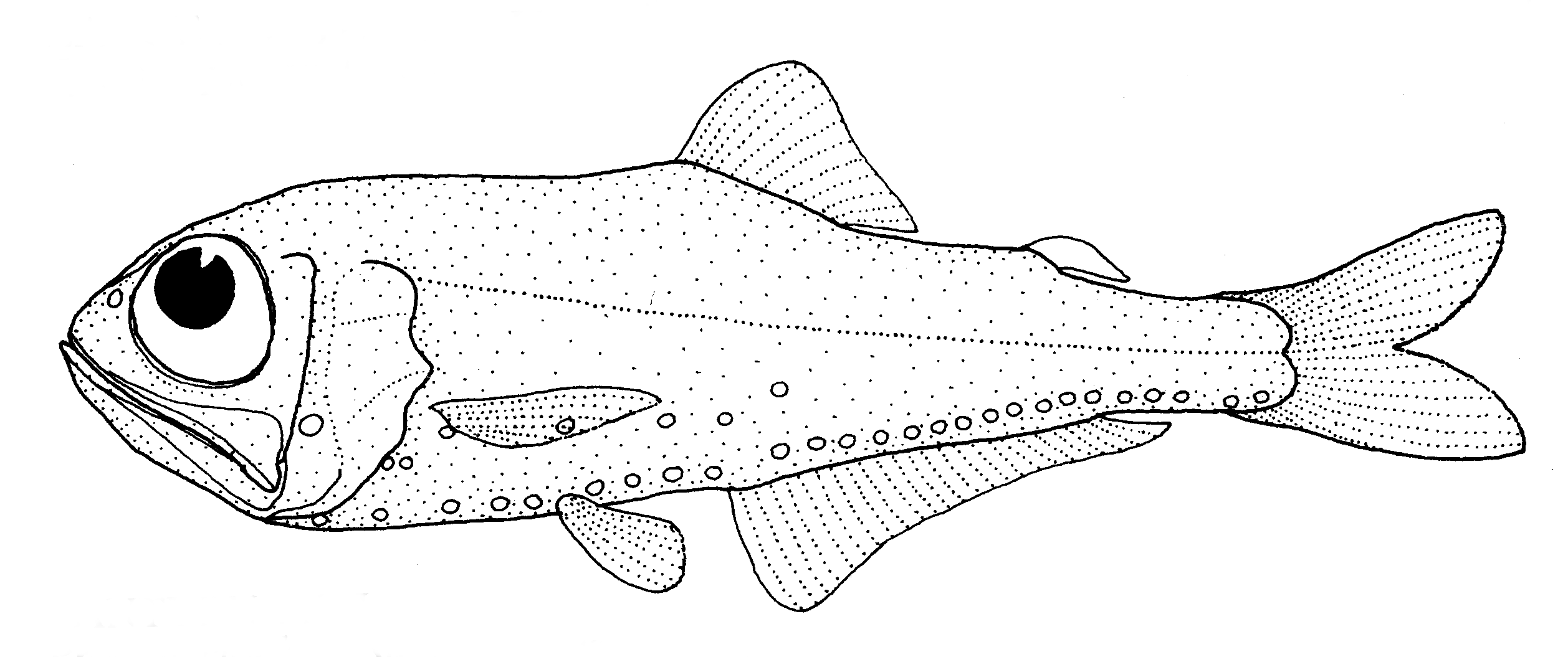
- Subparallel Lanternfish (P. subparallelum)

Scientific classification
- Domain: Eukaryota
- Kingdom: Animalia
- Phylum: Chordata
- Class: Actinopterygii
- Order: Myctophiformes
- Family: Myctophidae
- Genus: Protomyctophum; Fraser-Brunner, 1949

Species
- See text.

= Protomyctophum =

Protomyctophum Temporal range: Pliocene to Present

Genus of fishes

Protomyctophum is a genus of lanternfishes.

== Species ==
There are currently 16 recognized species in this genus:

- Protomyctophum andriashevi Becker, 1963
- Protomyctophum arcticum (Lütken, 1892) (Arctic telescope)
- Protomyctophum beckeri Wisner, 1971
- Protomyctophum bolini (Fraser-Brunner, 1949)
- Protomyctophum chilense Wisner, 1971
- Protomyctophum choriodon Hulley, 1981
- Protomyctophum crockeri (Bolin, 1939) (California flashlightfish)
- Protomyctophum gemmatum Hulley, 1981
- Protomyctophum kolaevi Prokofiev, 2004
- Protomyctophum luciferum Hulley, 1981
- Protomyctophum mcginnisi Prokofiev, 2005
- Protomyctophum normani (Tåning, 1932) (Norman's lanternfish)
- Protomyctophum parallelum (Lönnberg, 1905) (Parallel lanternfish)
- Protomyctophum subparallelum (Tåning, 1932) (Subparallel lanternfish)
- Protomyctophum tenisoni (Norman, 1930)
- Protomyctophum thompsoni (W. M. Chapman, 1944) (Bigeye lanternfish)
