= Protomyctophum thompsoni =

Scientific classification
- Domain: Eukaryota
- Kingdom: Animalia
- Phylum: Chordata
- Class: Actinopterygii
- Order: Myctophiformes
- Family: Myctophidae
- Genus: Protomyctophum
- Species: P. thompsoni

Binomial name
- Protomyctophum thompsoni Chapman, 1944

Species of fish

Protomyctophum thompsoni is a species of lanternfish.
