= Thorny skate =

Conservation status
- Vulnerable (IUCN 3.1)

Scientific classification
- Kingdom: Animalia
- Phylum: Chordata
- Class: Chondrichthyes
- Subclass: Elasmobranchii
- Order: Rajiformes
- Family: Rajidae
- Genus: Amblyraja
- Species: A. radiata

Binomial name
- Amblyraja radiata (Donovan, 1808)

Synonyms
- Raja radiata

Species of fish

The thorny skate (Amblyraja radiata) is a species of fish in the family Rajidae. This bottom-living skate lives in the North and south-eastern Atlantic Ocean in depths ranging from 20 to 1,000 m (66–3,281 ft) and water temperatures from −1 to 14 °C (30–57 °F).

== Species description ==
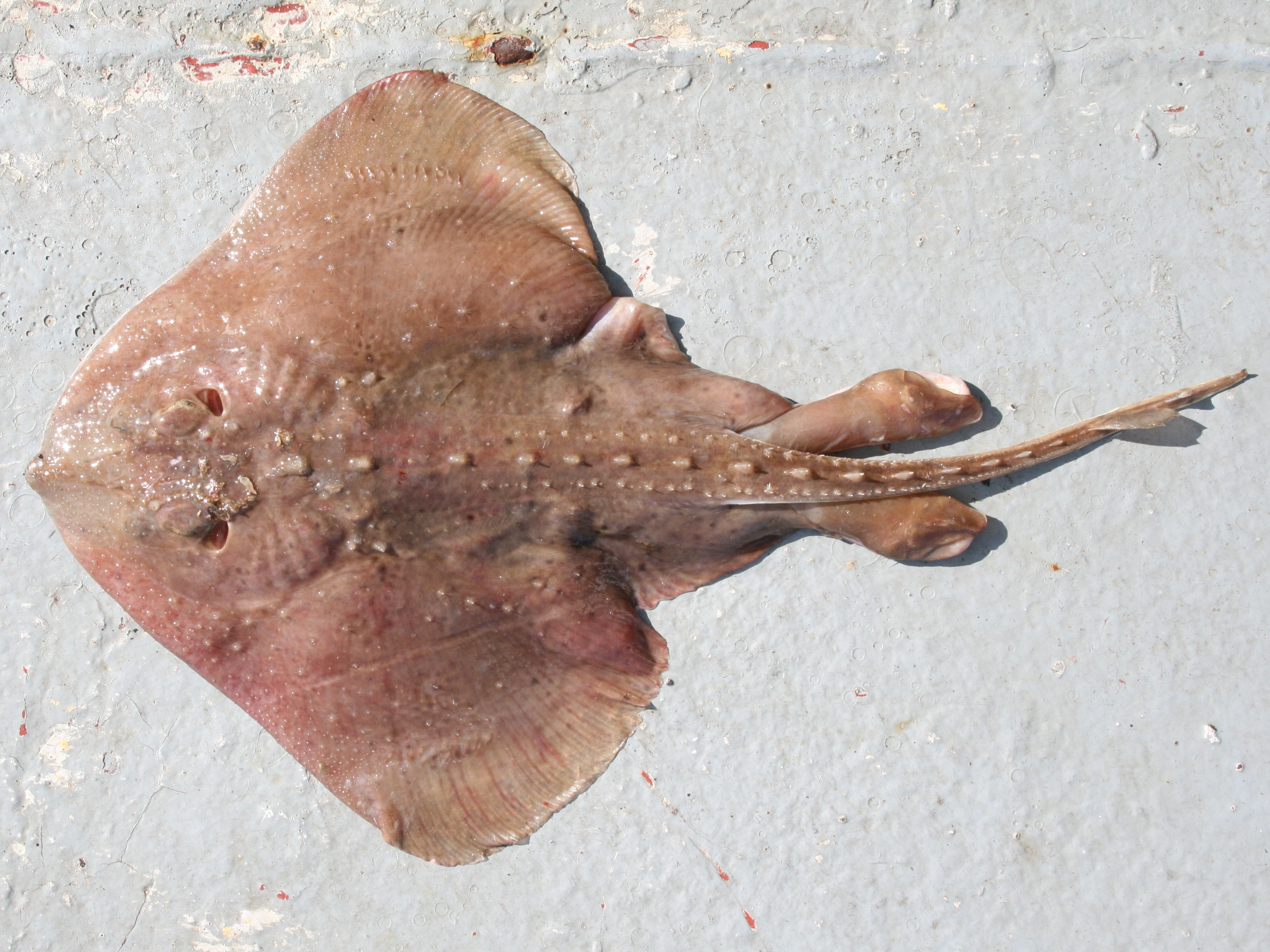

The thorny skate reaches up to 1.05 m (3.4 ft) in total length and 11.4 kg (25 lb) in weight. Males have alar thorns. The species lacks any interdorsal thorns. The upper and lower jaws of the thorny skate have 38-40 rows of teeth. Its underside is smooth, but the upper side, as the name suggests, is very rough with many small thorns all over and 13–17 larger ones in line from the back of the head to end of the tail. The top side is brown with possibly black spots and the underside is white. It has a hard, roughly triangular snout and a tail, which is shorter than its body. It eats crustaceans, small fishes, and worms.

== Distribution and habitat ==
Amblyraja radiata has been found from depths of 25–1,400 metres (82–4,593 ft), but primarily occurs between 27–439 metres (89–1,440 ft). It lives over muddy and sandy substrates.

== Reproduction ==
Dried egg capsule of thorny skate

Amblyraja radiata is oviparous, with females able to produce 10-45 egg capsules annually, which are 3–8 centimetres (1.2–3.1 in) long and 2.5–6 centimetres (0.98–2.36 in) wide and hatch outside of the body. The time required for incubation can take up to 36 months when at higher latitudes. At birth, thorny skates have a total length of 8–12 centimetres (3.1–4.7 in).

== Conservation status ==
Thorny skate are taken as bycatch in some fisheries. It is a U.S. National Marine Fisheries Service species of concern, which are those species about which the U.S. National Oceanic and Atmospheric Administration, National Marine Fisheries Service, has some concerns regarding status and threats, but for which insufficient information is available to indicate a need to list the species under the U.S. Endangered Species Act.
