= Protomyctophum parallelum =

Scientific classification
- Kingdom: Animalia
- Phylum: Chordata
- Class: Actinopterygii
- Order: Myctophiformes
- Family: Myctophidae
- Genus: Protomyctophum
- Species: P. parallelum

Binomial name
- Protomyctophum parallelum Lönnberg, 1905

Species of fish

Protomyctophum parallelum is a species of lanternfish.
