= Protomyctophum arcticum =

Scientific classification
- Kingdom: Animalia
- Phylum: Chordata
- Class: Actinopterygii
- Order: Myctophiformes
- Family: Myctophidae
- Genus: Protomyctophum
- Species: P. arcticum

Binomial name
- Protomyctophum arcticum Lütken, 1892

Species of fish

Protomyctophum arcticum is a species of lanternfish.
