= Thickbody skate =

Conservation status
- Vulnerable (IUCN 3.1)

Scientific classification
- Kingdom: Animalia
- Phylum: Chordata
- Class: Chondrichthyes
- Subclass: Elasmobranchii
- Order: Rajiformes
- Family: Rajidae
- Genus: Amblyraja
- Species: A. frerichsi

Binomial name
- Amblyraja frerichsi G. Krefft, 1968

Species of fish

The thickbody skate (Amblyraja frerichsi) is a species of fish in the family Rajidae found off the coasts of Argentina, Brazil, Chile, Peru and possibly the Falkland Islands (Malvinas). Its natural habitat is open seas.

== Etymology ==
The skate is named in honor of Thomas Frerichs, the captain of the research vessel Walther Herwig, from which the holotype specimen was collected, in recognition of his interest in deep-water fishing and his role in making specimens available for scientific study. Pasted text.

== Description ==
A. frerichsi is a large, dark-coloured skate. The dorsal surface ranges from dark lead-grey to blackish-grey, while the ventral surface is similarly dark and may appear almost blackish-blue in freshly caught specimens. Juveniles may have white mottling on the underside.

== Habitat ==
The species is a deep-water skate. Krefft recorded 143 specimens from depths of 600–1,000 m, with most sampling occurring at 800 and 1,000 m.

== Ecology ==
The remains of a fish were observed in the stomach of the holotype.
