= Jensen's skate =

Conservation status
- Least Concern (IUCN 3.1)

Scientific classification
- Kingdom: Animalia
- Phylum: Chordata
- Class: Chondrichthyes
- Subclass: Elasmobranchii
- Order: Rajiformes
- Family: Rajidae
- Genus: Amblyraja
- Species: A. jenseni

Binomial name
- Amblyraja jenseni (Bigelow & Schroeder, 1950)

Synonyms
- Raja jenseni

Species of cartilaginous fish

Jensen's skate (Amblyraja jenseni), also known as the shorttail skate, is a rare deep-sea skate typically found in the North Atlantic Ocean. The skate is named in honor of Danish zoologist Adolf Severin Jensen (1866–1953), of Lund University, for his contributions to the ichthyology of the North Atlantic Ocean.

== Species description ==
A. jenseni is a medium-sized skate. Populations of the species vary in size, such that those in the Mid-Atlantic ridge are largest with a total length range of 696-1113mm and those in the Northwest Atlantic are smaller, ranging 223-691mm in total length. The skate is widest at about 73 percent of the way from the tip of the snout to the axils of the pectoral fins. The disc of the skate is about 1.35 times as wide as it is long. The snout tip is rounded and does not project.

Jensen's skate has been found in a wide variety of chocolate-brown to gray colors. Specimens can typically be sorted into "light" or "dark" varieties, with corresponding markings. About one third of specimens exhibit light coloring and the remaining two-thirds exhibit dark coloring. The dorsal side of the skate has dark edges on the wings, dark spots on the disc, and alternating light and dark bands on the tail. The ventral side of the side is typically dark, with light areas around the mouth, snout, nostrils, around the gill slits, in the center of the abdomen behind the gills, on the claspers, and on the anterior lobe of the pelvic fins. The ventral surface is white in juveniles, and gets darker with age. Observations of the light color morph tend to be in the North-East Atlantic and North-West Atlantic, while dark color morphs are most frequently observed in the Mid-Atlantic Range.

Prickly scales cover the dorsal side in patches on the snout, between orbits, above the eyes, in front of the scapular regions, over the pectorals, and in dense belts on either side of the tail. The skate is smooth on the posterior margins of the pectorals, and the ventral side of the disc and tail.

Cartilaginous fishes, including skates, exhibit sexual dimorphism. Female Jensen's skates are larger than males, have longer first and third gill slits, and have a different number of nuchal and interdorsal thorns. In males, the lower part of the ventral fins becomes a copulative organ. Sexually mature male skates also have hook-shaped organs near their pectoral fins and the edges of the disc to hold onto the female during copulation. More specimens should be collected to gain further insights into the differences between male and female Jensen's skates.

A. jenseni closely resembles A. hyperborea, another deep-sea skate. The two species vary in their teeth: A. hyperborea has 38-44 series of teeth, whereas A. jenseni has 56-66 series of teeth. A. jenseni lacks thorns on its anterior margins and mid-posterior portions of its pectorals, as well as near the mid-dorsal line on the disc behind the nuchal region. The two species are separated geographically by the Davis Strait, which separates Arctic and Atlantic waters.

== Systematics and taxonomy ==
Order Rajiformes defines the batoids, a diverse group with 10 suborders. Skates (suborder Rajoidei) comprise the most genera and species within the batoids. Jensen's skate is a member of the family Rajidae, of which 13 genera and over 130 species are recognized. Amblyraja is the genus name of which 10 species are recognized: Amblyraja badia (Garman, 1899)—Broad skate, Amblyraja doellojuradoi (Pozzi, 1935)—Southern thorny skate, Amblyraja frerichsi (Krefft, 1968)—Thickbody skate, Amblyraja georgiana (Norman, 1938)—Antarctic starry skate, Amblyraja hyperborea (Collette, 1879)—Arctic skate, Amblyraja jenseni (Bigelow and Schroeder, 1950)—Jensen's skate, Amblyraja radiata (Donovan, 1808)—Thorny skate, Amblyraja reversa (Lloyd, 1906)—Reversed skate, Amblyraja robertsi (Hulley, 1970)—Bigmouth skate, and Amblyraja taaf (Meisner, 1987)—Whiteleg skate. There are at least two undescribed species within the genus.

== Distribution and habitat ==
Jensen's skate has been found in three main regions: the North-East Atlantic Ocean, the North-West Atlantic, and the Mid-Atlantic Ridge. The skate's known range includes the waters off the coast of North America near New England down to South Carolina, off the coast of Greenland, and across the Atlantic, west of the British Isles.

Specimens derived from the three main regions have different morphological features, varying in color and size likely due to long-term geographical isolation. Given that only a few specimens have been analyzed (n=19), it is hard to define exact geographical morphology differences, but researchers conclude there are regional differences to some degree. Specimens from the North-East Atlantic and North-West Atlantic are more similar to each other morphologically than they are to specimens from the Mid-Atlantic Ridge.

Jensen's skate is a benthic-benthopelagic species, inhabiting very deep marine environments. Specimens collected in the Mid-Atlantic Range were found at the greatest mean depth of 1996 m. Specimens from the North-East Atlantic were found in a similar range, with a mean of 1650 m, and specimens from the North-West Atlantic were found at the shallowest mean depth of 864 m. The North-East Atlantic waters Jensen's skate occupies have mean temperatures ranging (-0.1–6.9 ˚C).

== Life history ==
Jensen's skate feeds on fish, cephalopods, and decapod crustaceans, filling a similar ecological role as higher predators. Other species of deep-sea skates have similar diets.

Sexual maturity in skates can be determined by measuring their reproductive organs, which are correlated with the total length of the organisms. Male Jensen's skates reach sexual maturity when they are greater than 106 cm long, while female Jensen's skates reach sexual maturity when they are greater than 96 cm. Male skates have reproductive organs called claspers, which help hold onto the female during copulation. Juvenile male Jensen's skates typically have 0.2 cm long claspers, which increase in length as the fish grows until it reaches sexual maturity. After copulation, female skates develop pairs of purses, or egg cases, within their uterus. Jensen's skates are oviparous, meaning that the female eventually lays the purses and does not give live birth. Very little research exists describing the reproductive season of Jensen's skate, but studies of closely related species indicate species in the Amblyraja genus are typically fertile year-round with variable seasonal peaks in reproduction. Related species lay about 41-56 egg cases per year, indicating that Jensen's skate probably lays a similar amount. The egg cases of Jensen's skate are large, measuring 12 centimetres (4.7 in) in length by 8 centimetres (3.1 in) in width.

== Conservation status ==
As of 2019, Jensen's skate was listed as a species of Least Concern by the IUCN Shark Specialist Group. This species is not culturally significant for humans, nor is it significantly affected by human behavior. This deep-sea skate has typically only been caught when people were specifically seeking it out for scientific research purposes.
