= Amblyraja reversa =

Conservation status
- Data Deficient (IUCN 3.1)

Scientific classification
- Kingdom: Animalia
- Phylum: Chordata
- Class: Chondrichthyes
- Subclass: Elasmobranchii
- Order: Rajiformes
- Family: Rajidae
- Genus: Amblyraja
- Species: A. reversa

Binomial name
- Amblyraja reversa (Lloyd, 1906)

Species of cartilaginous fish

Amblyraja reversa, commonly known as the reversed skate, is a deepwater skate known from a single specimen. Based on the single specimen, its range is predicted to include at least the Western Indian Ocean, specifically the Baluchistan coast in the Arabian Sea.

Due to the limited knowledge of its biology and extent of capture in fisheries, this species is assessed as data deficient.
