= Protomyctophum crockeri =

Scientific classification
- Kingdom: Animalia
- Phylum: Chordata
- Class: Actinopterygii
- Order: Myctophiformes
- Family: Myctophidae
- Genus: Protomyctophum
- Species: P. crockeri

Binomial name
- Protomyctophum crockeri Bolin, 1939

Species of fish

Protomyctophum crockeri is a species of lanternfish.
