= Protomyctophum andriashevi =

Scientific classification
- Domain: Eukaryota
- Kingdom: Animalia
- Phylum: Chordata
- Class: Actinopterygii
- Order: Myctophiformes
- Family: Myctophidae
- Genus: Protomyctophum
- Species: P. andriashevi

Binomial name
- Protomyctophum andriashevi Becker, 1963

Species of fish

Protomyctophum andriashevi is a species of lanternfish which is circumpolar in the Southern Ocean. It is sometimes called Andriashev's lanternfish.
