= Protomyctophum mcginnisi =

Scientific classification
- Kingdom: Animalia
- Phylum: Chordata
- Class: Actinopterygii
- Order: Myctophiformes
- Family: Myctophidae
- Genus: Protomyctophum
- Species: P. mcginnisi

Binomial name
- Protomyctophum mcginnisi Prokofiev, 2005

Species of fish

Protomyctophum mcginnisi is a species of lanternfish.
