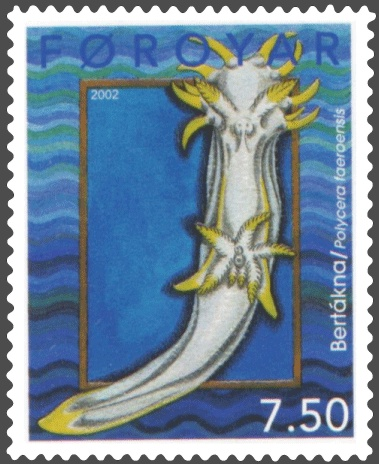
- Polycera faeroensis at 2002 Faroe Islands stamp made by Astrid Andreasen and published by Postverk Føroya.

Scientific classification
- Kingdom: Animalia
- Phylum: Mollusca
- Class: Gastropoda
- Order: Nudibranchia
- Family: Polyceridae
- Genus: Polycera
- Species: P. faeroensis

Binomial name
- Polycera faeroensis Lemche, 1929

= Polycera faeroensis =

Species of gastropod

Polycera faeroensis is a species of sea slug, a dorid nudibranch, a shell-less marine gastropod mollusc in the family Polyceridae.

== Distribution ==
This nudibranch is described originally from Faeroe Islands. In the northeast Atlantic it is a common species in shallow water as far south as Portugal.

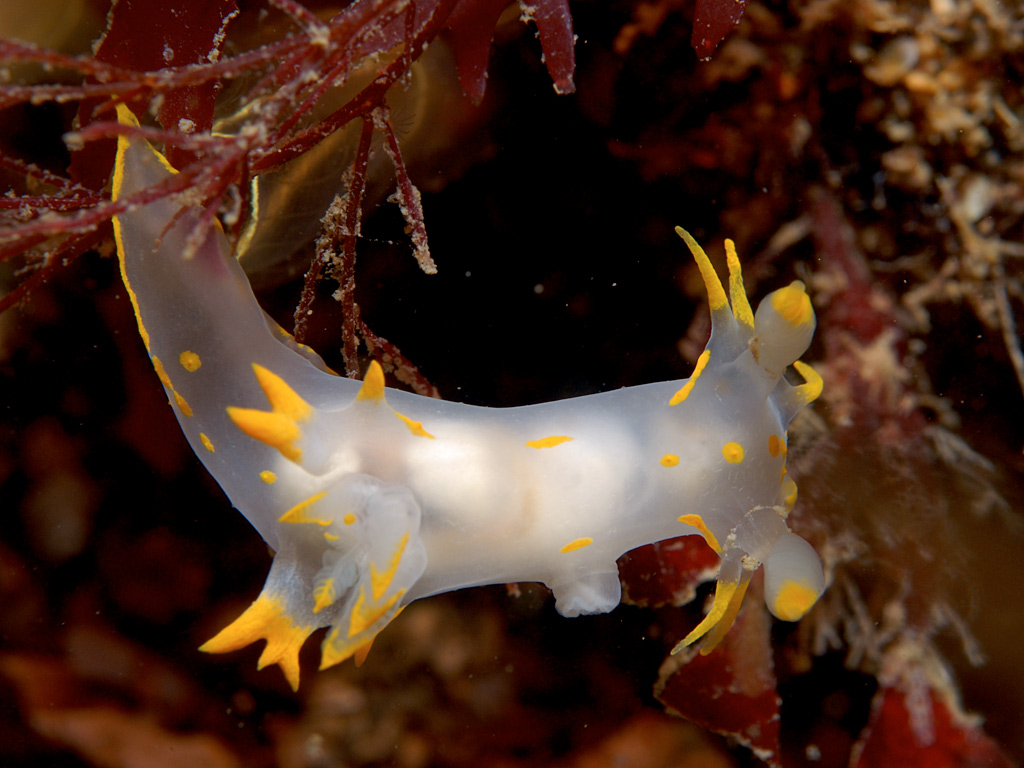
The nudibranch Polycera faeroensis, Strangford Lough, Co. Down, Northern Ireland.

== Description ==
The body of this nudibranch is translucent white with yellow processes and a yellow line along the ridge of the tail. The oral veil has eight or more yellow projections. The gills and rhinophores are translucent white, tipped with yellow. Alongside the gills the pallial margin is expanded and gives rise to a pair or a series of yellow-tipped projections. Some individuals have yellow spots or lines on the body. The animal may reach 30mm in total length. It is distinguished from Polycera quadrilineata in having more than six processes on the oral veil and a more squat body shape.

== Ecology ==
Polycera faeroensis feeds on erect bryozoans Bicellariella ciliata, Bugula flabellata and family Crisiidae.
