= Amblyraja taaf =

Conservation status
- Data Deficient (IUCN 3.1)

Scientific classification
- Kingdom: Animalia
- Phylum: Chordata
- Class: Chondrichthyes
- Subclass: Elasmobranchii
- Order: Rajiformes
- Family: Rajidae
- Genus: Amblyraja
- Species: A. taaf

Binomial name
- Amblyraja taaf (Meissner, 1987)

Species of cartilaginous fish

Amblyraja taaf, commonly known as the whiteleg skate or thorny skate, is a little-known skate found at depths ranging from 150 to 600 m. It has been located off Crozet and Kerguelen Islands. Other specimens have been found off the coast of South Africa and Madagascar, but may be unrepresentative of the skate's native regions. Because of the limited knowledge of its biology and extent of capture in fisheries, this species is assessed as data deficient.
