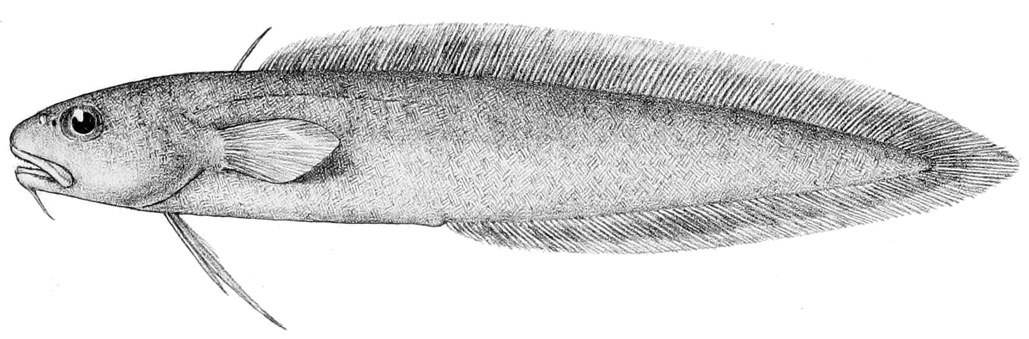
- Muraenolepis microps

Scientific classification
- Kingdom: Animalia
- Phylum: Chordata
- Class: Actinopterygii
- Order: Gadiformes
- Suborder: Macrouroidei
- Family: Muraenolepididae; Regan, 1903

Genera
- Muraenolepis; Notomuraenobathys

= Muraenolepididae =

Family of fishes

The Muraenolepididae is a family of cod-like fish, known as eel cods, found in southern oceans.
