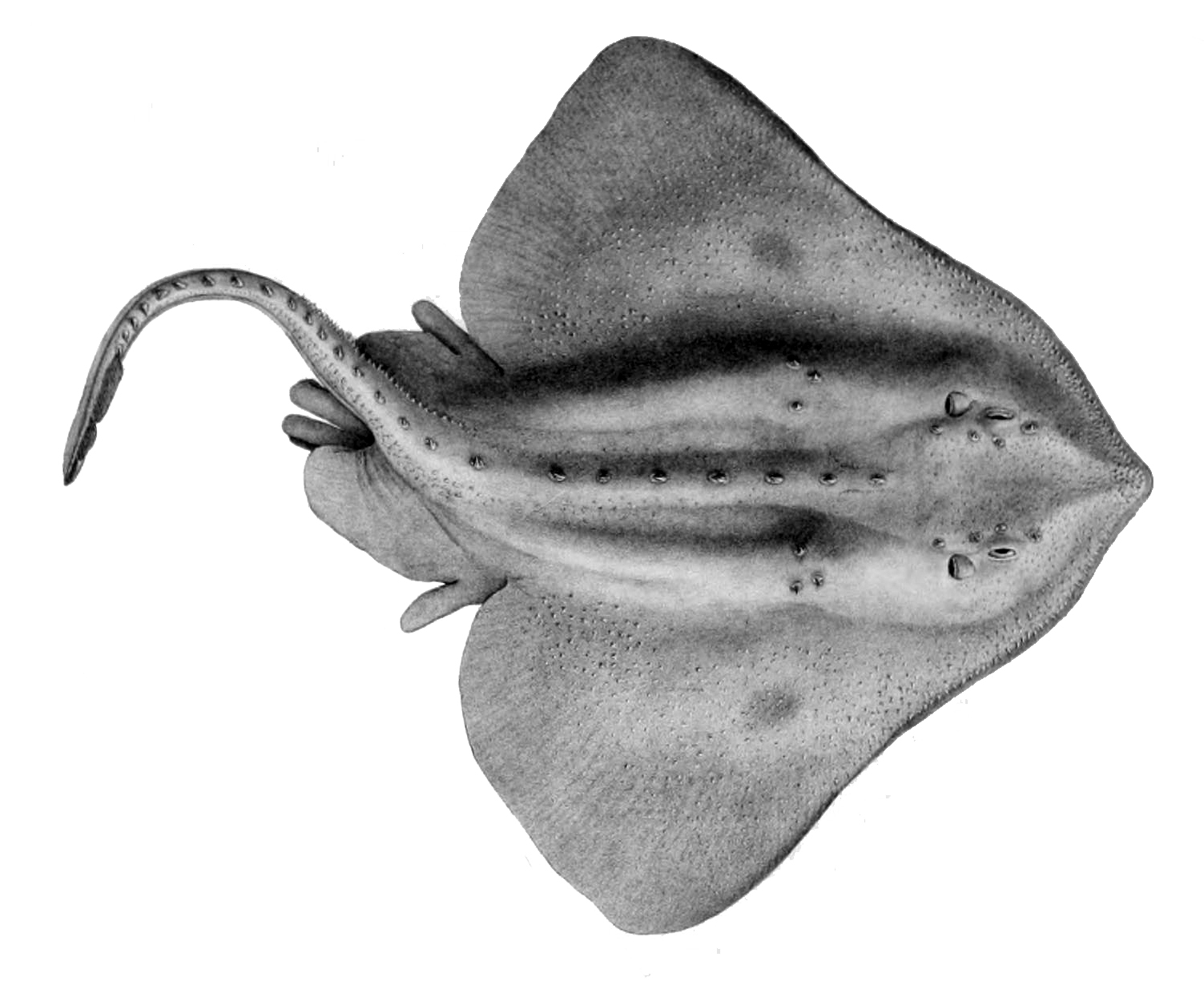

Conservation status
- Least Concern (IUCN 3.1)

Scientific classification
- Kingdom: Animalia
- Phylum: Chordata
- Class: Chondrichthyes
- Subclass: Elasmobranchii
- Order: Rajiformes
- Family: Rajidae
- Genus: Amblyraja
- Species: A. hyperborea

Binomial name
- Amblyraja hyperborea (Collett, 1879)

= Arctic skate =

Species of fish

The Arctic skate (Amblyraja hyperborea) is a species of fish in the family Rajidae. It lives near the seabed between 140 and 2,500 m deep in the Arctic Ocean and waters around Canada and northern and north-western Europe, in the northern Pacific Ocean, and in waters surrounding Antarctica and New Zealand.

The Arctic skate is about 1 m long and is gray-brown with large dark spots. Its underside is white with dark patterns. It has thorns in line from back to near the end of its tail. It is oviparous; its eggs are capsules with hard horns on each corner. It eats all sorts of small animals at the bottom of the sea.

== Description ==
The Arctic Skate has a total length of 16–23 centimetres (6.3–9.1 in) at birth, and a maximum total length of approximately 112 centimetres (44 in). The dark margins on the underside of the Arctic Skate increase as it ages. Its dorsal surface is scattered with small thornlets and has a coarse texture.

== Distribution and habitat ==
Amblyraja hyperborea has been found to occur between 165–3,165 metres (541–10,384 ft), but primarily below 800 metres (2,600 ft) in waters under 4.0 °C (39.2 °F), and have a preference for rough rocky substrate or cobblestone reefs.

== Taxonomy ==
This species was first described by Robert Collett in 1879 and named Raja hyperborea.

== Conservation ==
The Arctic skate is classified as being of "least concern" by the IUCN Red List of Threatened Species.

In New Zealand, the Department of Conservation has classified the Arctic skate as "Not Threatened" under the New Zealand Threat Classification System.
