= List of birds of Heard Island and McDonald Islands =

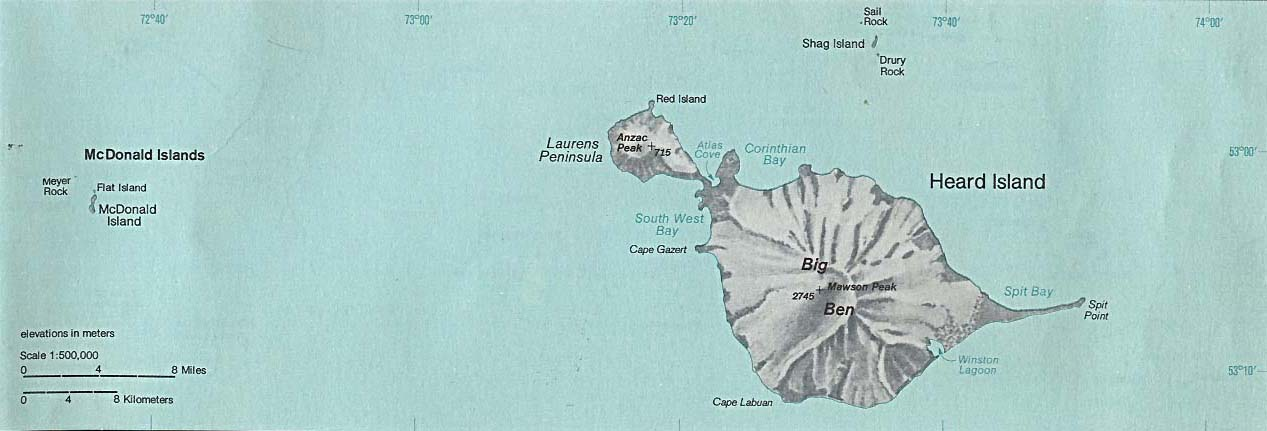
Map of the islands

This is a list of the birds of Heard Island and the adjacent McDonald Islands in the southern Indian Ocean. For other animals there, see List of non-avian fauna of Heard Island and McDonald Islands.

The avifauna of Antarctica include a total of 47 species, of which 1 is endemic. This list's taxonomic treatment (designation and sequence of orders, families and species) and nomenclature (common and scientific names) follow the conventions of The Clements Checklist of Birds of the World, 2022 edition. The family accounts at the beginning of each heading reflect this taxonomy, as do the species counts found in each family account.

The birds of Heard Island and McDonald Islands, a subantarctic Australian territory between Australia, Africa and Antarctica, are, whether breeders or visitors, almost all seabirds which find their food at sea in the waters of the surrounding Southern Ocean. An exception is the black-faced sheathbill, an opportunistic scavenger around seal and penguin colonies and the only solely terrestrial breeding bird species present on the islands. The southern giant-petrel and Subantarctic skua are also scavengers as well as predators at seabird colonies.

Heard Island is an important breeding site for macaroni, eastern rockhopper, gentoo and king penguins. Endemic species or subspecies are the Heard shag and the black-faced sheathbill. The surrounding waters are home to numerous species of albatross and petrel, some of which breed on the islands, including the endangered southern giant-petrel and the wandering albatross, both threatened by long-line fishing.

The following tags have been used to highlight several categories. The commonly occurring native species do not fall into any of these categories.

- (A) Accidental - a species that rarely or accidentally occurs in Heard and McDonald Islands
- (E) Endemic - a species endemic to Heard and McDonald Islands

== Sheathbills ==
Order: Charadriiformes Family: Chionididae

The sheathbills are scavengers of the Antarctic regions. They have white plumage and look plump and dove-like, but are believed to be similar to the ancestors of the modern gulls and terns.

- Black-faced sheathbill, Chionis minor

== Skuas and jaegers ==
Order: Charadriiformes Family: Stercorariidae

The family Stercorariidae are, in general, medium to large birds, typically with grey or brown plumage, often with white markings on the wings. They nest on the ground in temperate and arctic regions and are long-distance migrants.

- South polar skua, Stercorarius maccormicki (A)
- Brown skua, Stercorarius antarctica

== Gulls, terns, and skimmers ==
Order: Charadriiformes Family: Laridae

Laridae is a family of medium to large seabirds, the gulls, terns, and skimmers. Gulls are typically grey or white, often with black markings on the head or wings. They have stout, longish bills and webbed feet. Terns are a group of generally medium to large seabirds typically with grey or white plumage, often with black markings on the head. Most terns hunt fish by diving but some pick insects off the surface of fresh water. Terns are generally long-lived birds, with several species known to live in excess of 30 years.

- Kelp gull, Larus dominicanus
- Arctic tern, Sterna paradisaea
- Antarctic tern, Sterna vittata

== Penguins ==
Order: Sphenisciformes Family: Spheniscidae

The penguins are a group of aquatic, flightless birds living almost exclusively in the Southern Hemisphere. Most penguins feed on krill, fish, squid and other forms of sealife caught while swimming underwater.

- King penguin, Aptenodytes patagonicus
- Emperor penguin, Aptenodytes forsteri
- Adelie penguin, Pygoscelis adeliae
- Gentoo penguin, Pygoscelis papua
- Chinstrap penguin, Pygoscelis antarctica
- Macaroni penguin, Eudyptes chrysolophus
- Southern rockhopper penguin, Eudyptes chrysocome

== Albatrosses ==
Order: Procellariiformes Family: Diomedeidae

The albatrosses are among the largest of flying birds, and the great albatrosses from the genus Diomedea have the largest wingspans of any extant birds.

- Yellow-nosed albatross, Thalassarche chlororhynchos (A)
- Grey-headed albatross, Thalassarche chrysostoma (A)
- Black-browed albatross, Thalassarche melanophris
- Sooty albatross, Phoebetria fusca (A)
- Light-mantled albatross, Phoebetria palpebrata
- Royal albatross, Diomedea epomophora (A)
- Wandering albatross, Diomedea exulans

== Southern storm-petrels ==
Order: Procellariiformes Family: Oceanitidae

The southern storm-petrels are relatives of the petrels and are the smallest seabirds. They feed on planktonic crustaceans and small fish picked from the surface, typically while hovering. The flight is fluttering and sometimes bat-like.

- Wilson's storm petrel, Oceanites oceanicus
- Grey-backed storm petrel, Garrodia nereis
- Black-bellied storm petrel, Fregetta tropica (A)

== Shearwaters and petrels ==
Order: Procellariiformes Family: Procellariidae

The procellariids are the main group of medium-sized petrels, characterised by united nostrils with medium septum and a long outer functional primary.

- Southern giant petrel, Macronectes giganteus
- Northern giant petrel, Macronectes halli (A)
- Southern fulmar, Fulmarus glacialoides
- Antarctic petrel, Thalassoica antarctica
- Cape petrel, Daption capense
- Snow petrel, Pagodroma nivea
- Kerguelen petrel, Aphrodroma brevirostris (A)
- Soft-plumaged petrel, Pterodroma mollis (A)
- White-headed petrel, Pterodroma lessonii (A)
- Mottled petrel, Pterodroma inexpectata (A)
- Blue petrel, Halobaena caerulea (A)
- Fairy prion, Pachyptila turtur
- Broad-billed prion, Pachyptila vittata (A)
- Salvin's prion, Pachyptila salvini
- Antarctic prion, Pachyptila desolata
- Slender-billed prion, Pachyptila belcheri (A)
- Fulmar prion, Pachyptila crassirostris
- Grey petrel, Procellaria cinerea (A)
- White-chinned petrel, Procellaria aequinoctialis (A)
- Sooty shearwater, Ardenna grisea
- Common diving petrel, Pelecanoides urinatrix
- South Georgia diving petrel, Pelecanoides georgicus

== Cormorants and shags ==
Order: Suliformes Family: Phalacrocoracidae

Phalacrocoracidae is a family of medium to large coastal, fish-eating seabirds that includes cormorants and shags. Plumage colour varies, with the majority having mainly dark plumage, some species being black-and-white and a few being colourful.

- Imperial cormorant, Leucocarbo atriceps
- Heard Island shag, Leucocarbo nivalis (E)

== See also ==
- Heard and McDonald Islands Important Bird Area
- List of birds
- Lists of birds by region
