= African dwarf skate =

Conservation status
- Least Concern (IUCN 3.1)

Scientific classification
- Kingdom: Animalia
- Phylum: Chordata
- Class: Chondrichthyes
- Subclass: Elasmobranchii
- Order: Rajiformes
- Family: Rajidae
- Genus: Neoraja
- Species: N. stehmanni

Binomial name
- Neoraja stehmanni (Hulley, 1972)

Species of fish

The African dwarf skate (Neoraja stehmanni), or South African pygmy skate, is a species of fish in the family Rajidae. It is endemic to South Africa. Its natural habitat is open seas.

== Sources ==
.
