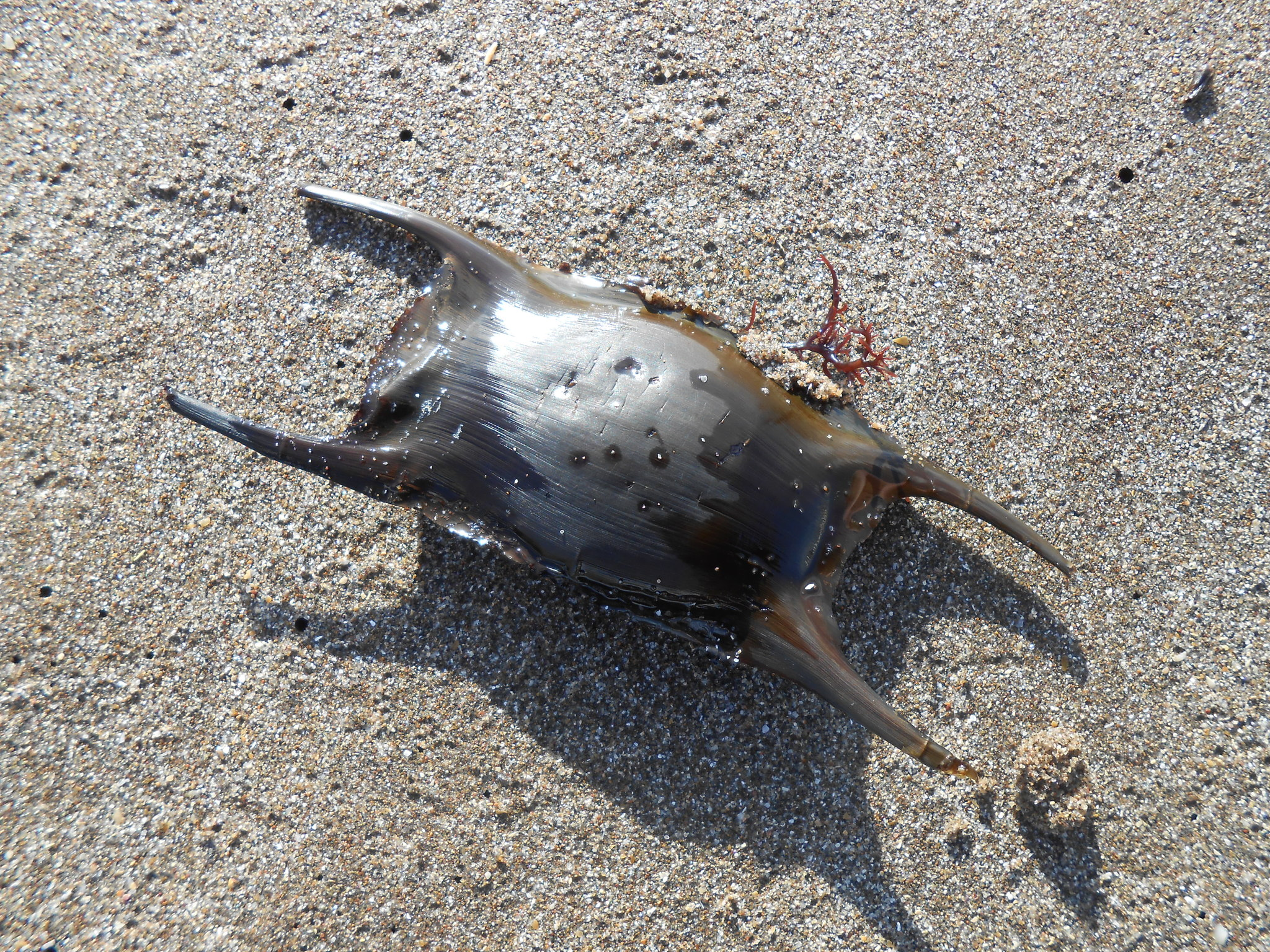
- Egg pouch

Conservation status
- Least Concern (IUCN 3.1)

Scientific classification
- Kingdom: Animalia
- Phylum: Chordata
- Class: Chondrichthyes
- Subclass: Elasmobranchii
- Order: Rajiformes
- Family: Rajidae
- Genus: Amblyraja
- Species: A. doellojuradoi

Binomial name
- Amblyraja doellojuradoi Pozzi, 1935

= Southern thorny skate =

Species of fish

The southern thorny skate (Amblyraja doellojuradoi) is a species of fish in the family Rajidae. It is found in the southern Atlantic Ocean off the coasts of Argentina, Uruguay and the Falkland Islands in depths ranging from 51 to 642 m. Its maximum size is 69 cm. It lays oblong egg capsules with horn-like projections at the corners which are laid in sandy or muddy flats. The eggs measure 86.4 mm in length and 56.2 mm in width.

== Etymology ==
The species is named in honor of Argentine marine biologist Martín Doello-Jurado (1884–1948), of the Museo Argentino de Ciencias Naturales.
