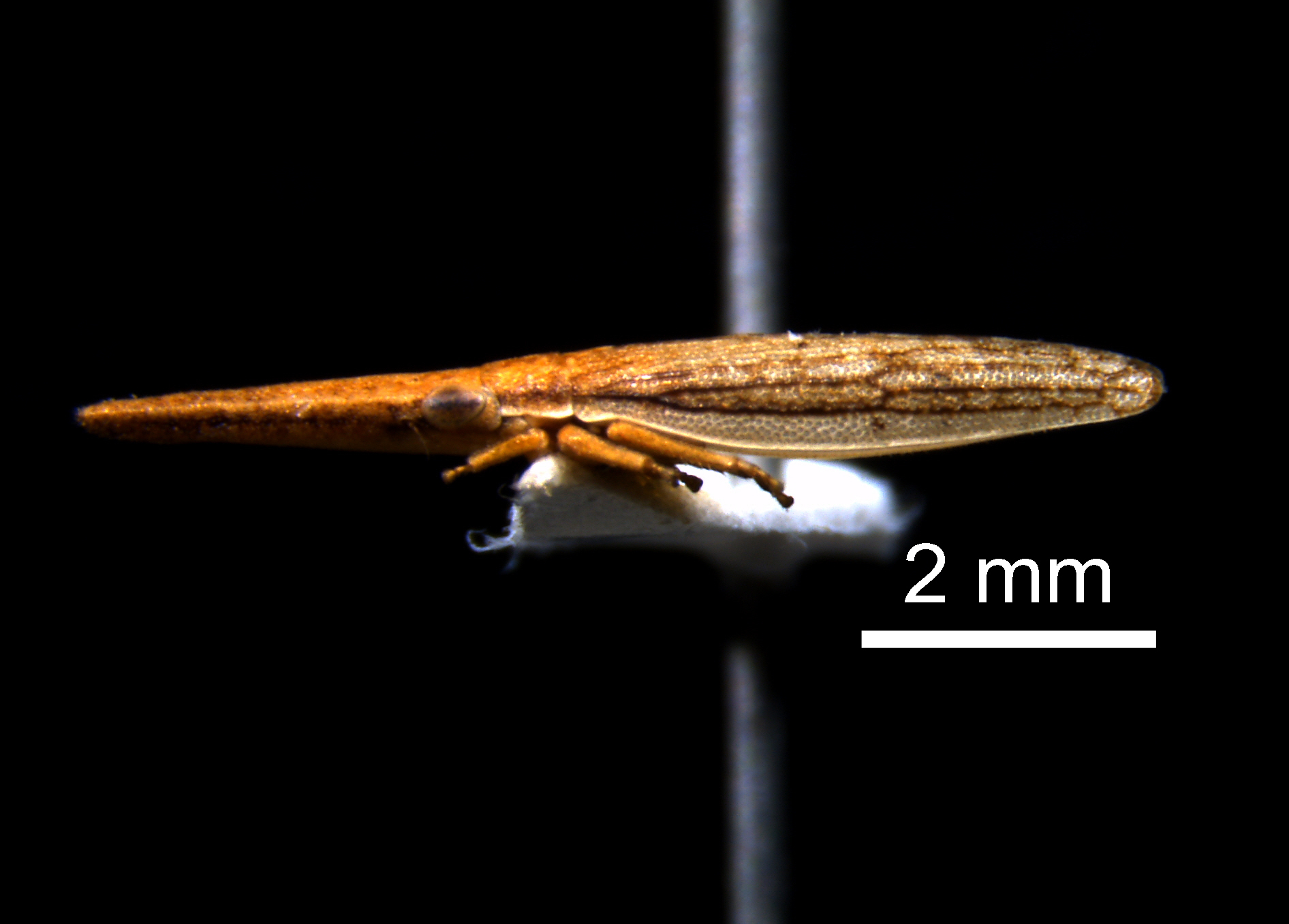
- Male Cephalelus bicoloratus, a South African restio leafhopper.

Scientific classification
- Domain: Eukaryota
- Kingdom: Animalia
- Phylum: Arthropoda
- Class: Insecta
- Order: Hemiptera
- Suborder: Auchenorrhyncha
- Family: Cicadellidae
- Subfamily: Ulopinae
- Tribe: Cephalelini; Amyot & Serville, 1843

= Cephalelini =

Tribe of leafhoppers

The Cephalelini is a tribe of leafhoppers containing several genera found in South Africa, Australia and New Zealand. Most species associate with plants from the Restionaceae family. The South African Cephalelini are commonly known as restio leafhoppers.
