= Antarctic starry skate =

Conservation status
- Data Deficient (IUCN 3.1)

Scientific classification
- Kingdom: Animalia
- Phylum: Chordata
- Class: Chondrichthyes
- Subclass: Elasmobranchii
- Order: Rajiformes
- Family: Rajidae
- Genus: Amblyraja
- Species: A. georgiana

Binomial name
- Amblyraja georgiana (Norman, 1938)

Species of fish

The Antarctic starry skate (Amblyraja georgiana) is a species of fish in the family Rajidae. It lives near the seabed in depths ranging from 20 to 350 m in South Georgia.

It also occurs off South America and in the South Atlantic.

Its maximum length is 1.15 m. It produces oblong egg capsules that have four sharp thorns in each corner and measure 116.5 mm long and 80.0 mm wide.

== Etimology ==
The specific name georgiana is derived from South Georgia, the type locality of the species, with the Latin suffix -ana, meaning “belonging to” or “pertaining to”.
