= Bigmouth skate =

Conservation status
- Least Concern (IUCN 3.1)

Scientific classification
- Kingdom: Animalia
- Phylum: Chordata
- Class: Chondrichthyes
- Subclass: Elasmobranchii
- Order: Rajiformes
- Family: Rajidae
- Genus: Amblyraja
- Species: A. robertsi

Binomial name
- Amblyraja robertsi (Hulley, 1906)

Species of fish

The bigmouth skate (Amblyraja robertsi) is a species of fish in the family Rajidae. It lives near the bottom in deep waters in Southeast Atlantic in depths below 1,000 m (3,280 ft). Its maximum size is 77 cm (30 in). It has a hard, roughly triangular snout and smooth body with star-based thorns around its eyes, tail, and elsewhere. Its top side is dark gray and underside has white spots. As the name suggests, it has a large mouth.
