= Smallhead moray cod =

Scientific classification
- Kingdom: Animalia
- Phylum: Chordata
- Class: Actinopterygii
- Order: Gadiformes
- Family: Moridae
- Genus: Notomuraenobathys; Balushkin & Prirodina, 2010
- Species: N. microcephalus

Binomial name
- Notomuraenobathys microcephalus (Norman, 1937)

Synonyms
- Muraenolepis microcephala Norman, 1937

Species of fish

The smallhead moray cod, Notomuraenobathys microcephalus, is a species of eel cod found in the Scotia Sea and around the Antarctic Peninsula and Enderby Coast. This species can be found at depths from 1,976 to 3,040 m (6,480 to 9,970 ft). This species grows to 30 cm (12 in) in total length.
