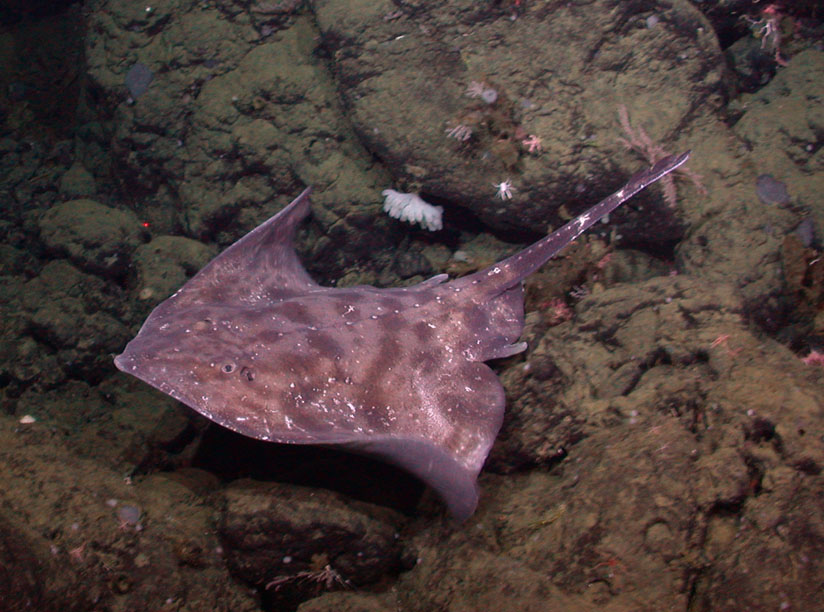
- A broad skate on the Davidson Seamount, at a depth of 1641 meters.

Conservation status
- Least Concern (IUCN 3.1)

Scientific classification
- Kingdom: Animalia
- Phylum: Chordata
- Class: Chondrichthyes
- Subclass: Elasmobranchii
- Order: Rajiformes
- Family: Rajidae
- Genus: Amblyraja
- Species: A. badia

Binomial name
- Amblyraja badia (Garman, 1899)

Synonyms
- Raja badia Garman, 1899

= Broad skate =

Species of cartilaginous fish

The broad skate (Amblyraja badia) is a poorly known species of skate in the family Rajidae. It occurs at depths of 846 to 2,324 metres (2,776 to 7,625 ft), and has been observed via remotely operated underwater vehicle by the Monterey Bay Aquarium Research Institute as deep as 3,167 metres (10,390 ft), making it one of the deepest-occurring skates known. It is sporadically distributed in the Pacific Ocean, from the Gulf of Panama to British Columbia and the Bering Sea, to the Tohoku Slope off northern Honshu and the Okhotsk Slope off Hokkaido. The species name, badia, comes from the Latin batius meaning "brown", referring to its color.

== Description ==
The pectoral fin disc of the broad skate is wider than it is long, with sharply rounded apices. The snout is short and blunt, with several enlarged thornlets at the tip. Its underside is smooth and its dorsal surface is densely covered with prickles. Two or three pairs of distinctive scapular thorns are on each shoulder, usually arranged in a triangle, and a row of 24-29 median thorns along the back, flanked by a row of smaller lateral thornlets on the tail. The tail is relatively short and tapering, with two similar-sized dorsal fins and no interdorsal thorn. The very small caudal fin is placed close behind the second dorsal fin. The coloration is chocolate-brown to gray-brown above with scattered darker spots, same below except for the pelvic fin lobes and tail, which are darker. Whitish areas are on the snout, upper abdomen, nostrils, mouth, gill slits, and anal opening.

Broad skates feed on cephalopods, crustaceans, and small bony fishes such as rattails. They are presumably oviparous like other skate species. Males mature from 86 to 93 cm (34 to 37 in) and grow to at least 95 cm (37 in), while females grow to at least 99 cm (39 in). The smallest known free-swimming specimens measured 23 cm (9.1 in). This species is of no commercial interest, but is occasionally taken as bycatch in deepwater trawls and traps.
