= Protomyctophum kolaevi =

Scientific classification
- Kingdom: Animalia
- Phylum: Chordata
- Class: Actinopterygii
- Order: Myctophiformes
- Family: Myctophidae
- Genus: Protomyctophum
- Species: P. kolaevi

Binomial name
- Protomyctophum kolaevi Prokofiev, 2004

Species of fish

Protomyctophum kolaevi is a species of lanternfish.
