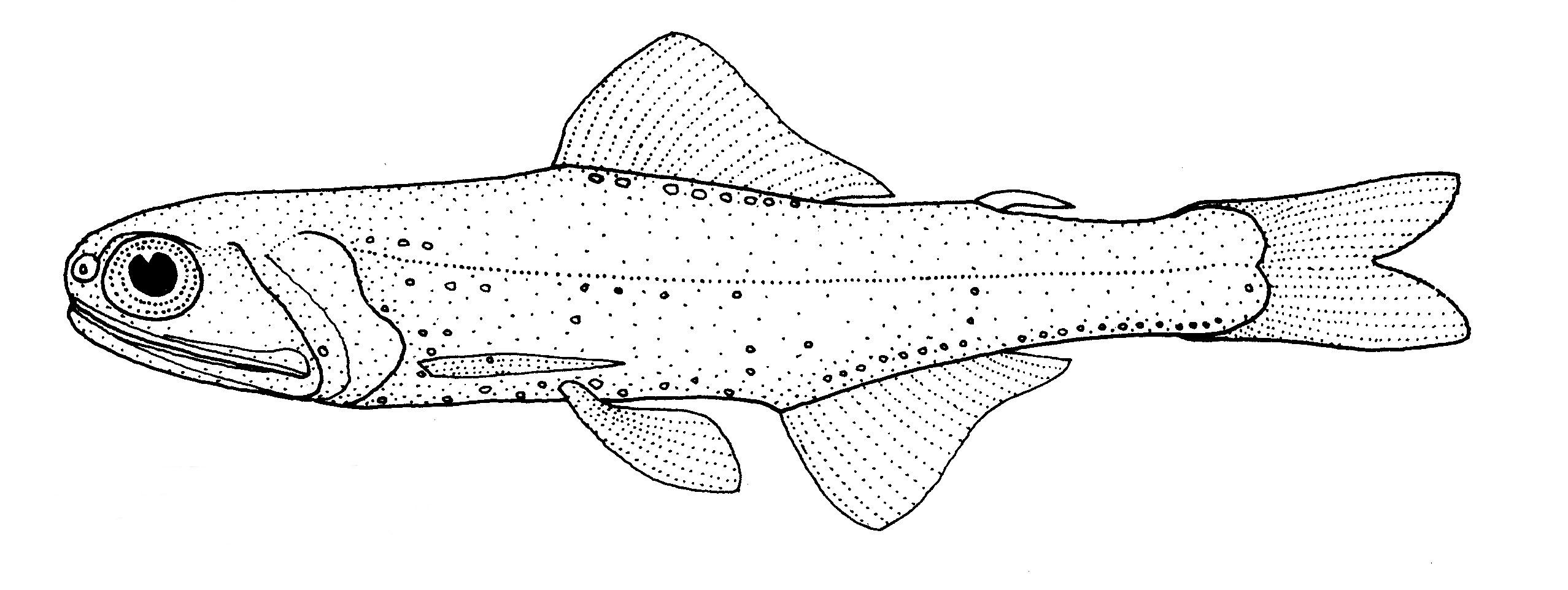
- Drawing by Dr Tony Ayling

Scientific classification
- Domain: Eukaryota
- Kingdom: Animalia
- Phylum: Chordata
- Class: Actinopterygii
- Order: Myctophiformes
- Family: Myctophidae
- Genus: Gymnoscopelus
- Species: G. piabilis

Binomial name
- Gymnoscopelus piabilis (Whitley, 1931)

= Gymnoscopelus piabilis =

Species of fish

Gymnoscopelus piabilis, the Southern blacktip lanternfish is a species of lanternfish found circumglobally in the Southern Hemisphere between about 46° and 52°S, at depths below 100 metres (330 ft) at night. This species grows to a length of 14.6 centimetres (5.7 in) SL. It is a mesopelagic-benthopelagic species.

== Bibliography ==
- Froese, Rainer; Pauly, Daniel (eds.). "Gymnoscopelus piabilis". FishBase. April 2012 version.
