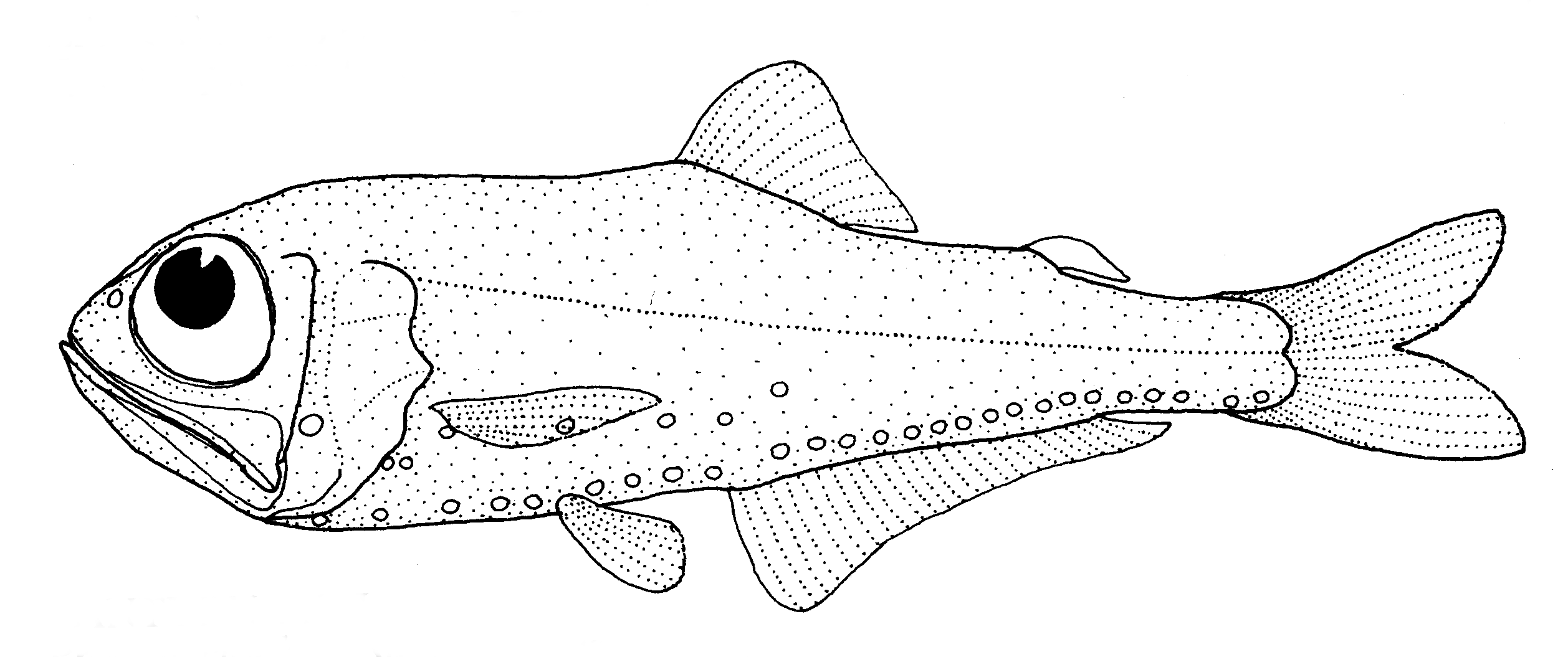
- Drawing by Dr Tony Ayling

Scientific classification
- Domain: Eukaryota
- Kingdom: Animalia
- Phylum: Chordata
- Class: Actinopterygii
- Order: Myctophiformes
- Family: Myctophidae
- Genus: Protomyctophum
- Species: P. subparallelum

Binomial name
- Protomyctophum subparallelum (Tåning, 1932)

= Protomyctophum subparallelum =

Species of fish

Protomyctophum subparallelum is a lanternfish in the family Myctophidae, found circumglobally in the southern hemisphere south of about 30° S, in deep water. Its length is about 3.6 cm. It is a mesopelagic species.
