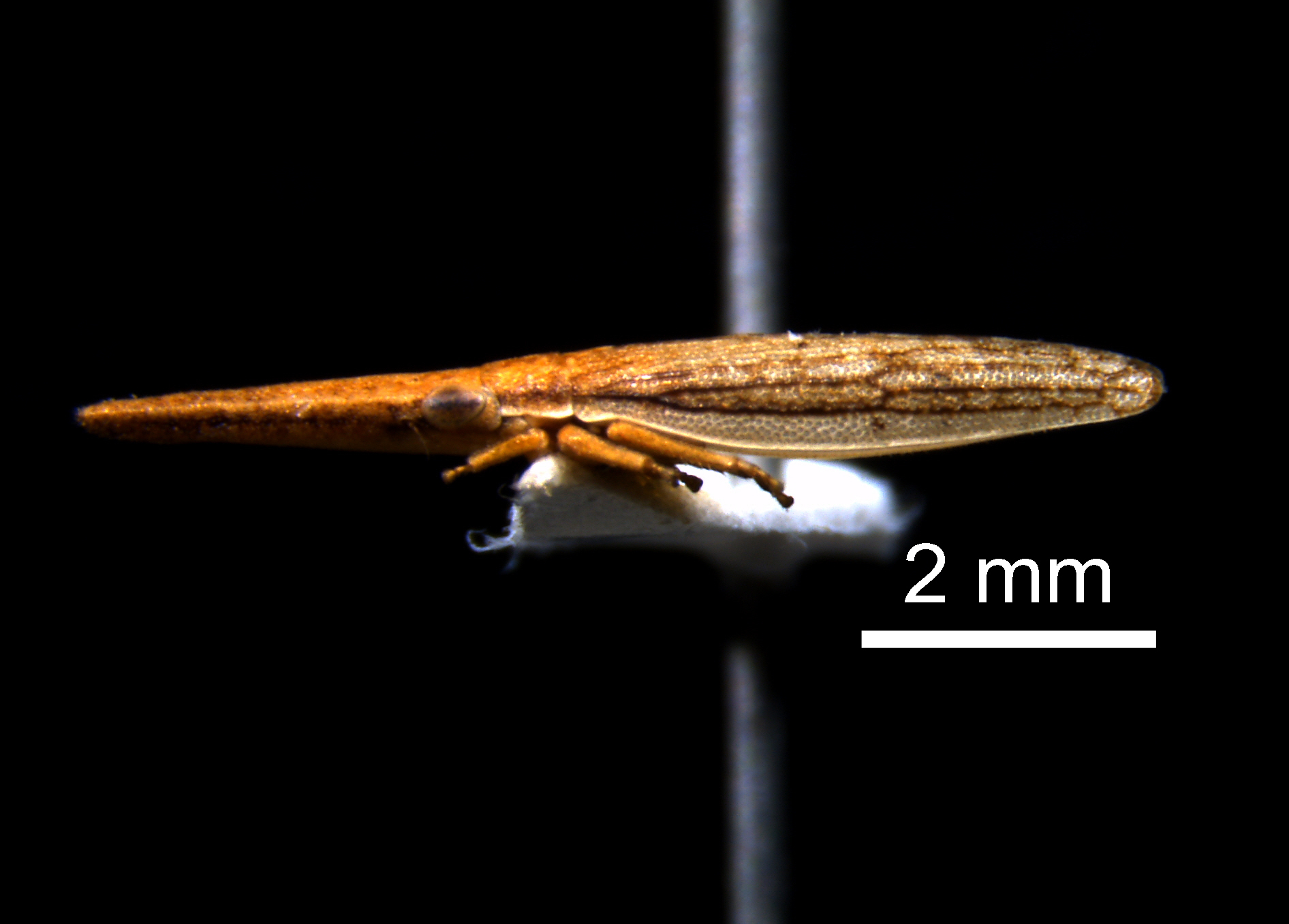
- Male Cephalelus bicoloratus from the tribe Cephalelini.

Scientific classification
- Kingdom: Animalia
- Phylum: Arthropoda
- Class: Insecta
- Order: Hemiptera
- Suborder: Auchenorrhyncha
- Family: Cicadellidae
- Subfamily: Ulopinae; Le Peletier & Audinet-Serville, 1828

= Ulopinae =

Subfamily of leafhoppers

Ulopinae is a subfamily of leafhoppers.

== Description ==
Leafhoppers from this group have hardened, elytra like forewings. They are often brown or black in colour and can be covered with small pits

== Tribes and genera ==
The World Auchenorrhyncha Database includes:

Cephalelini
Coloborrhinini

1. Coloborrhis Germar, 1836
2. Colosteres Emeljanov, 1996
3. Pyrgophora Emeljanov, 1996
4. Ulopedra Emeljanov, 1996

Mesargini

1. Mesargus Melichar, 1903

Monteithiini

1. Monteithia Evans, 1968

=== Ulopini ===
1. Aethiopulopa Evans, 1947
2. Asichnus Emeljanov, 1992
3. Austrolopa Evans, 1937
4. Caplopa Evans, 1947
5. Conlopa Evans, 1971
6. Daimachus Distant, 1916
7. Delopa Evans, 1971
8. Doowella McKamey, 2006
9. Kafulopa Smith & Webb, 2016
10. Kahavalu Kirkaldy, 1906
11. Kivulopa Linnavuori, 1972
12. Ledracorrhis Evans, 1959
13. Mblokoa Linnavuori, 1972
14. Megulopa Lindberg, 1925
15. Mesoparopia Matsumura, 1912
16. Microlopa Evans, 1966
17. Neobufonaria Koçak, 1981
18. Novolopa Evans, 1966
19. Pyrenaeibufonaria Szwedo, 2001
20. Radhades Distant, 1912
21. Stenoledra Evans, 1954
22. Taslopa Evans, 1942
23. Ulopa Fallén, 1814
24. Ulopella Poisson, 1938
25. Uloprora Evans, 1939
26. Ulopsina Dai, Viraktamath & Zhang, 2012
27. Utecha Emeljanov, 1996 - includes Utecha trivia
