= Utecha trivia =

Scientific classification
- Kingdom: Animalia
- Phylum: Arthropoda
- Class: Insecta
- Order: Hemiptera
- Suborder: Auchenorrhyncha
- Family: Cicadellidae
- Subfamily: Ulopinae
- Tribe: Ulopini
- Genus: Utecha
- Species: U. trivia

Binomial name
- Utecha trivia (Germar, 1821)

Species of true bug

Utecha trivia is a European species of leafhopper.

== Description ==
The species are 2.5–3.5 millimetres (0.098–0.138 in) in length. The males have a distinctive mark and a light yellowish colour base with black streaks starting from clavus to the forewing. The same streaks can be found along the cubital vein and radial veins and on the vertex, close to the eye. Females are completely yellowish-brown with slight amount of dark spots.

== Habitat ==
The species like to feed on horseshoe vetch, Hippocrepis comosa.
