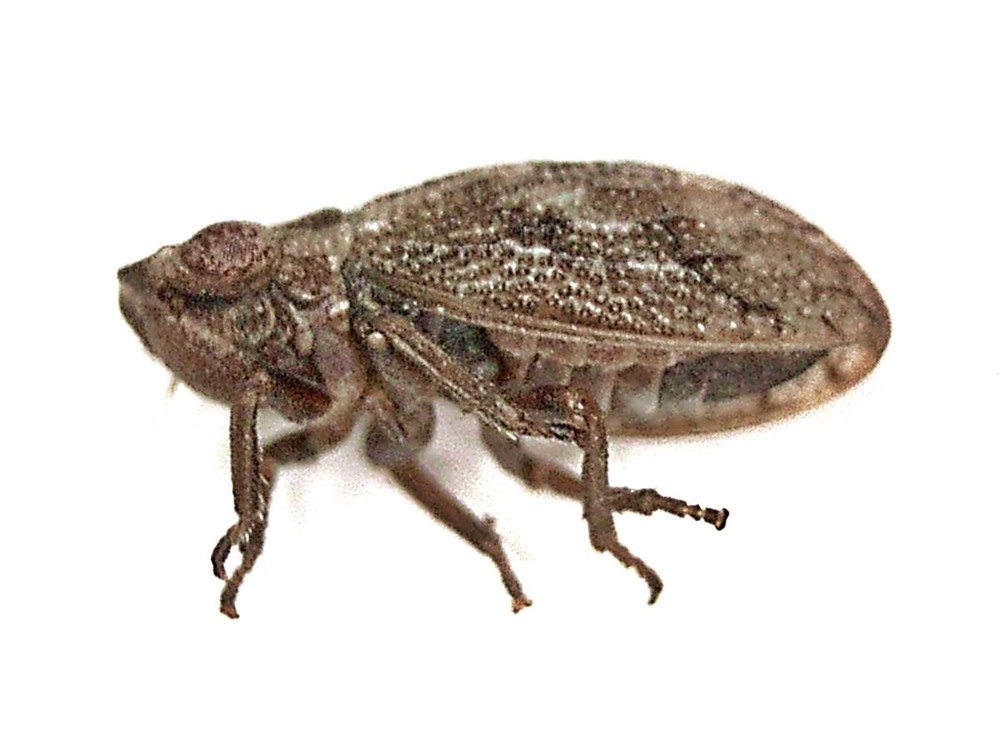

Scientific classification
- Kingdom: Animalia
- Phylum: Arthropoda
- Clade: Pancrustacea
- Class: Insecta
- Order: Hemiptera
- Suborder: Auchenorrhyncha
- Family: Cicadellidae
- Genus: Ulopa
- Species: U. reticulata

Binomial name
- Ulopa reticulata (Fabricius, 1794)

= Ulopa reticulata =

Species of true bug

Ulopa reticulata is a species of bug from the family Cicadellidae.

== Description ==
The species are 3 millimetres (0.12 in) in length and are brown coloured. It is marked with two lightly coloured bands across the wings, and sometimes with a third one at the lower base.

== Habitat ==
The species feed on Erica and Calluna, mostly eating the base of the plant.
