= Krefftichthys =

Conservation status
- Least Concern (IUCN 3.1)

Scientific classification
- Kingdom: Animalia
- Phylum: Chordata
- Class: Actinopterygii
- Order: Myctophiformes
- Family: Myctophidae
- Genus: Krefftichthys; Hulley, 1981
- Species: K. anderssoni

Binomial name
- Krefftichthys anderssoni (Lönnberg, 1905)

Synonyms
- Myctophum anderssoni Lönnberg, 1905; Protomyctophum anderssoni (Lönnberg, 1905); Krefftichthys andersoni (Lönnberg, 1905)

Species of fish

Krefftichthys anderssoni is a species of lanternfish found circumglobally in the southern oceans. This species grows to a length of 7.1 centimetres (2.8 in) SL.
