= Tjärnö Marine Biological Laboratory =

Swedish marine science station

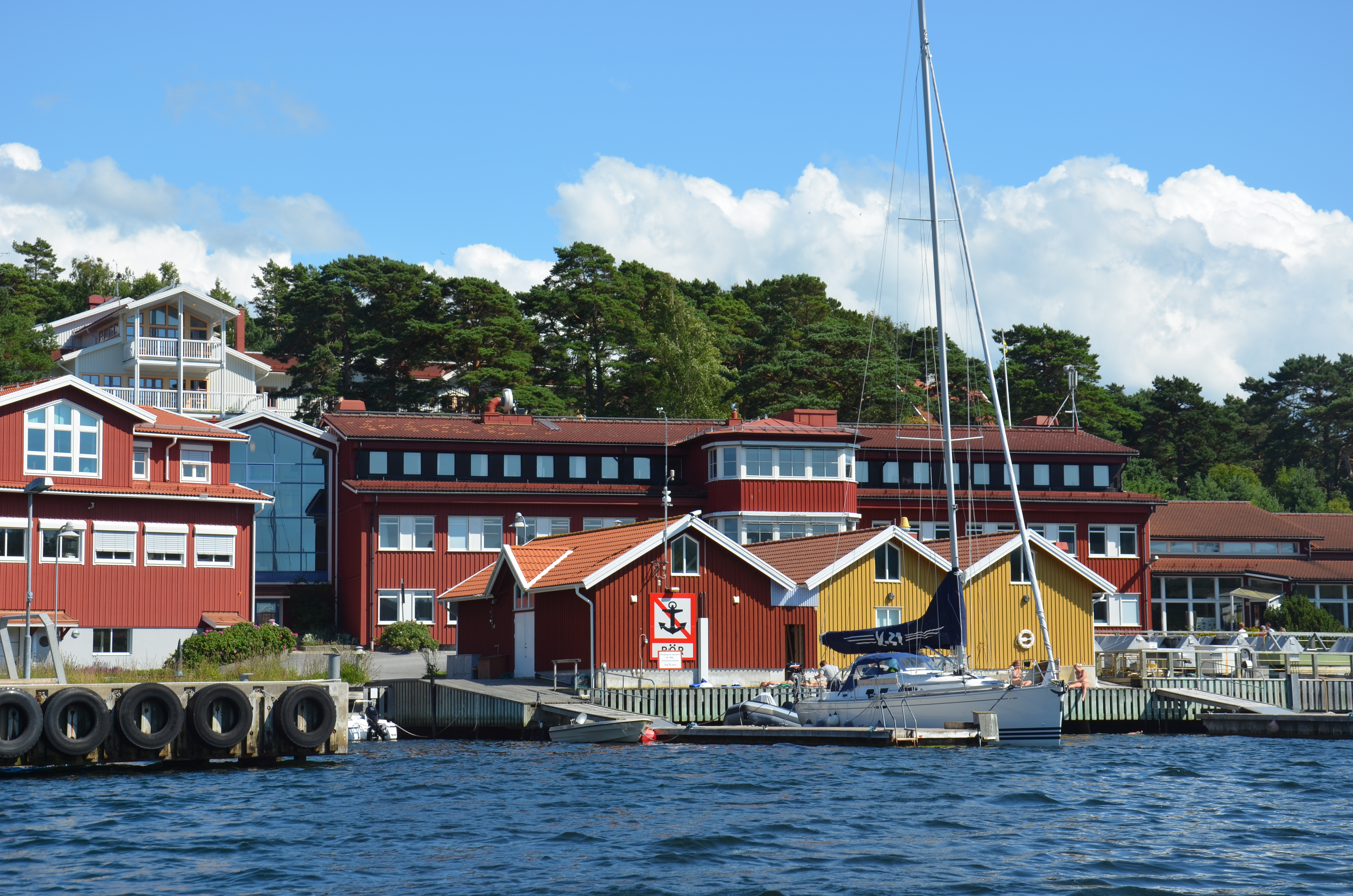

The Tjärnö Marine Laboratory is a marine science field station in Sweden. It is part of the University of Gothenburg and located on the island Tjärnö, Strömstad Municipality in the northern part of Bohuslän province.

TML was founded as a field station for university education in marine biology in 1963. During the first half of 1970s TML became staffed year round, and scientists began to choose TML for their permanent place of work. The activities have expanded and diversified. 70 people now work permanently at TML.

Within 10 minutes by boat lies the Koster fjord, a 247 meter deep fissure fault between the Koster Islands and the mainland. It is in deep-water contact with the remaining Skagerrak, the North Sea and the Atlantic Ocean beyond, leading to oceanic salinity, 35 ‰, in the bottom water. This is the only true oceanic environment in Sweden, with the highest number of marine species in Sweden. Between 5000 and 10000 species are to be found in the Skagerrak, and more than 200 of them do not occur elsewhere in Swedish waters. For instance, cold water reefs of stony corals could be found.

Annually, about 500 university students, mainly from Gothenburg, attend courses at TML, lasting from one week to one term. A large proportion of the education is devoted to identification of marine algal and animal species. Other courses are more concerned with ecology, including training in experiments and investigations. Field education, on research vessels, in smaller boats and at the shore, are common.

The major research programs are directed towards marine ecology, presented under six programs – marine chemical ecology, evolution and genetics, biodiversity, biohydrodynamics, fishery biology and aquaculture, and integrated coastal zone management. Most scientists at TML belong to the Department of Marine Sciences at the University of Gothenburg.

TML is a resource for regional industry, decision-makers and authorities, and gives support for the development of research-based marine innovations and business projects.

At TML anyone can book guided tours and beach excursions. During summer season the public also can visit the aquarium, listen to popular science lectures and participate in excursions with research vessel.

== Sources ==
- Tjärnö Marine Laboratory
