= Daimachus =

Scientific classification
- Kingdom: Animalia
- Phylum: Arthropoda
- Clade: Pancrustacea
- Class: Insecta
- Order: Hemiptera
- Suborder: Auchenorrhyncha
- Family: Cicadellidae
- Subfamily: Ulopinae
- Tribe: Ulopini
- Genus: Daimachus; Distant, 1916

Synonyms
- Diamachus [sic] Distant, 1916

Genus of true bugs

Daimachus is a genus of Indian leafhoppers in the subfamily Ulopinae and tribe Ulopini, erected by William Lucas Distant in 1916.

== Species ==
The World Auchenorrhyncha Database includes:

1. Daimachus exemplificatus Distant, 1916 - type species (original designation)
2. Daimachus matheranensis Viraktamath & Webb, 2019
3. Daimachus robustus Viraktamath & Webb, 2019
4. Daimachus sirsiensis Viraktamath & Webb, 2019
5. Daimachus sudindicus Viraktamath & Webb, 2019
