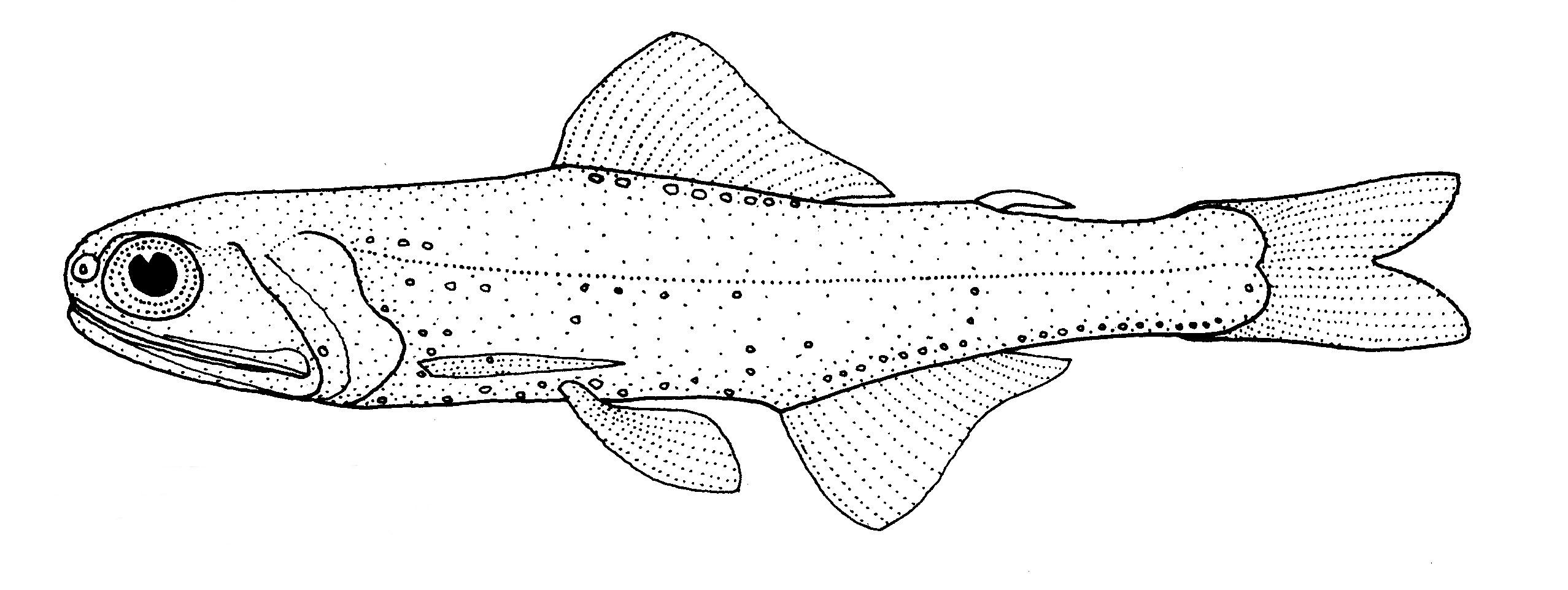
- Gymnoscopelus piabilis

Scientific classification
- Domain: Eukaryota
- Kingdom: Animalia
- Phylum: Chordata
- Class: Actinopterygii
- Order: Myctophiformes
- Family: Myctophidae
- Genus: Gymnoscopelus; Günther, 1873

Species
- See text.

= Gymnoscopelus =

Gymnoscopelus Temporal range: 5–0 Ma Pliocene to Present

Genus of fishes

Gymnoscopelus is a genus of lanternfishes. The name is from the Greek gymnos, "naked" and skopelos, "lanternfish."

They can live in extremely cold water; two species, Gymnoscopelus nicholsi and Gymnoscopelus braueri, have been recorded at up to 75°S in the Ross Sea.

== Species ==
There are currently eight recognized species in this genus:

- Gymnoscopelus bolini Andriashev, 1962
- Gymnoscopelus braueri (Lönnberg, 1905)
- Gymnoscopelus fraseri (Fraser-Brunner, 1931)
- Gymnoscopelus hintonoides Hulley, 1981 (False-midas lanternfish)
- Gymnoscopelus microlampas Hulley, 1981 (Minispotted lanternfish)
- Gymnoscopelus nicholsi (C. H. Gilbert, 1911) (Nichol's lanternfish)
- Gymnoscopelus opisthopterus Fraser-Brunner, 1949
- Gymnoscopelus piabilis (Whitley, 1931) (Southern blacktip lanternfish)
