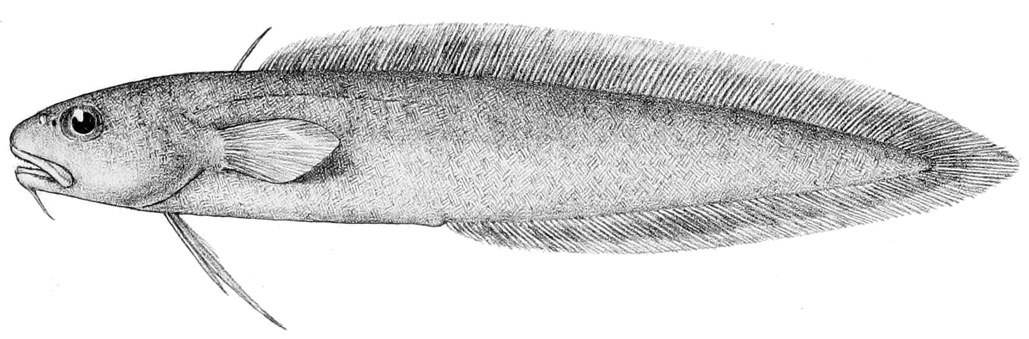
- Smalleye Moray Cod (M. microps)

Scientific classification
- Kingdom: Animalia
- Phylum: Chordata
- Class: Actinopterygii
- Order: Gadiformes
- Family: Muraenolepididae
- Genus: Muraenolepis; Günther, 1880

Type species
- Muraenolepis marmoratus Günther, 1880

= Muraenolepis =

Genus of fishes

Muraenolepis is a genus of eel cods.

== Species ==
The currently recognized species in this genus are:

- Muraenolepis andriashevi Balushkin & Prirodina, 2005
- Muraenolepis evseenkoi Balushkin & Prirodina, 2010
- Muraenolepis kuderskii Balushkin & Prirodina, 2007
- Muraenolepis marmorata Günther, 1880 (marbled moray cod)
- Muraenolepis microps Lönnberg, 1905 (smalleye moray cod)
- Muraenolepis orangiensis Vaillant, 1888 (Patagonian moray cod)
- Muraenolepis pacifica Prirodina & Balushkin, 2007 (southern Pacific moray cod)
- Muraenolepis trunovi Balushkin & Prirodina, 2006
