= Protomyctophum bolini =

Scientific classification
- Kingdom: Animalia
- Phylum: Chordata
- Class: Actinopterygii
- Order: Myctophiformes
- Family: Myctophidae
- Genus: Protomyctophum
- Species: P. bolini

Binomial name
- Protomyctophum bolini Fraser-Brunner, 1949

Species of fish

Protomyctophum bolini is a species of lanternfish.

== Distribution ==
Circumpolar between Antarctic Divergence and Subtropical Convergence zone. Southeast Atlantic and Western Indian Ocean: between 41°40'-45°25'S, 17°17'-36°32'E
