= P. Alexander Hulley =

South African ichthyologist

Percy Alexander Hulley
- Born: 23 February 1941 (age 85)
- Education: University of Cape Town
- Known for: Describing the taillight shark
- Spouse: Jane Charlotte Roberts
- Children: 3
- Scientific career
- Fields: Zoology; Ichthyology
- Theses: Studies on the anatomy of some South African Mytilidae (Bivalvia) with notes on their ecology and distribution (1967 (MSc)); The origin, interrelationship and distribution of Southern African Rajidae (Chondrichthyes, Batoidei) (1971 (PhD))

Percy Alexander Hulley (born 23 February 1941) is a South African zoologist and ichthyologist. He is a research associate at the South African Museum and has described many species of fish including the taillight shark.

== Biography ==
Hulley completed his MSc in 1967 from the University of Cape Town with a thesis entitled: Studies on the anatomy of some South African Mytilidae (Bivalvia) with notes on their ecology and distribution. He submitted his PhD thesis in 1971 entitled: The origin, interrelationship and distribution of Southern African Rajidae (Chondrichthyes, Batoidei)

He has worked at the South African Museum since 1965, where he was deputy director (research) and curator of fishes at the South African Museum until 2005. From 2006, Hulley has worked at the South African Museum in an honorary capacity as a research associate.

The comprehensive Mesopelagic Fish Collection of the South African museum was assembled primarily by Hulley. The collection contains fish that live between 200m and 1 000m below the surface. Mesopelagic fish constitutes 95% of the world’s fish biomass.

== Selected publications ==
Hulley has authored or co-authored more than 100 articles, reports and chapters for academic works, including:

- Polidoro, Beth A.; Ralph, Gina M.; Strongin, Kyle; Harvey, Michael; Hulley, Percival A.; et al. (15 February 2017). "The status of marine biodiversity in the Eastern Central Atlantic (West and Central Africa)". Aquatic Conservation: Marine and Freshwater Ecosystems. 27 (5). Wiley: 1021–1034. Bibcode:2017ACMFE..27.1021P. doi:10.1002/aqc.2744. ISSN 1052-7613.
- Duhamel, Guy; Belchier, Mark; Hulley, P. Alexander; et al. (January 2014). "BIOGEOGRAPHIC PATTERNS OF FISH. THE BIOGEOGRAPHIC ATLAS OF THE SOUTHERN OCEAN". doi:10.13140/2.1.1828.3203.
- Koubbi, Philippe; Hulley, P.; Raymond, B; et al. (2011). Estimating the biodiversity of the subantarctic Indian part for ecoregionalisation: Part I. Pelagic realm of CCAMLR areas 58.5.1. and 58.6. Report of the CCAMLR WS-MPA, Brest, France.

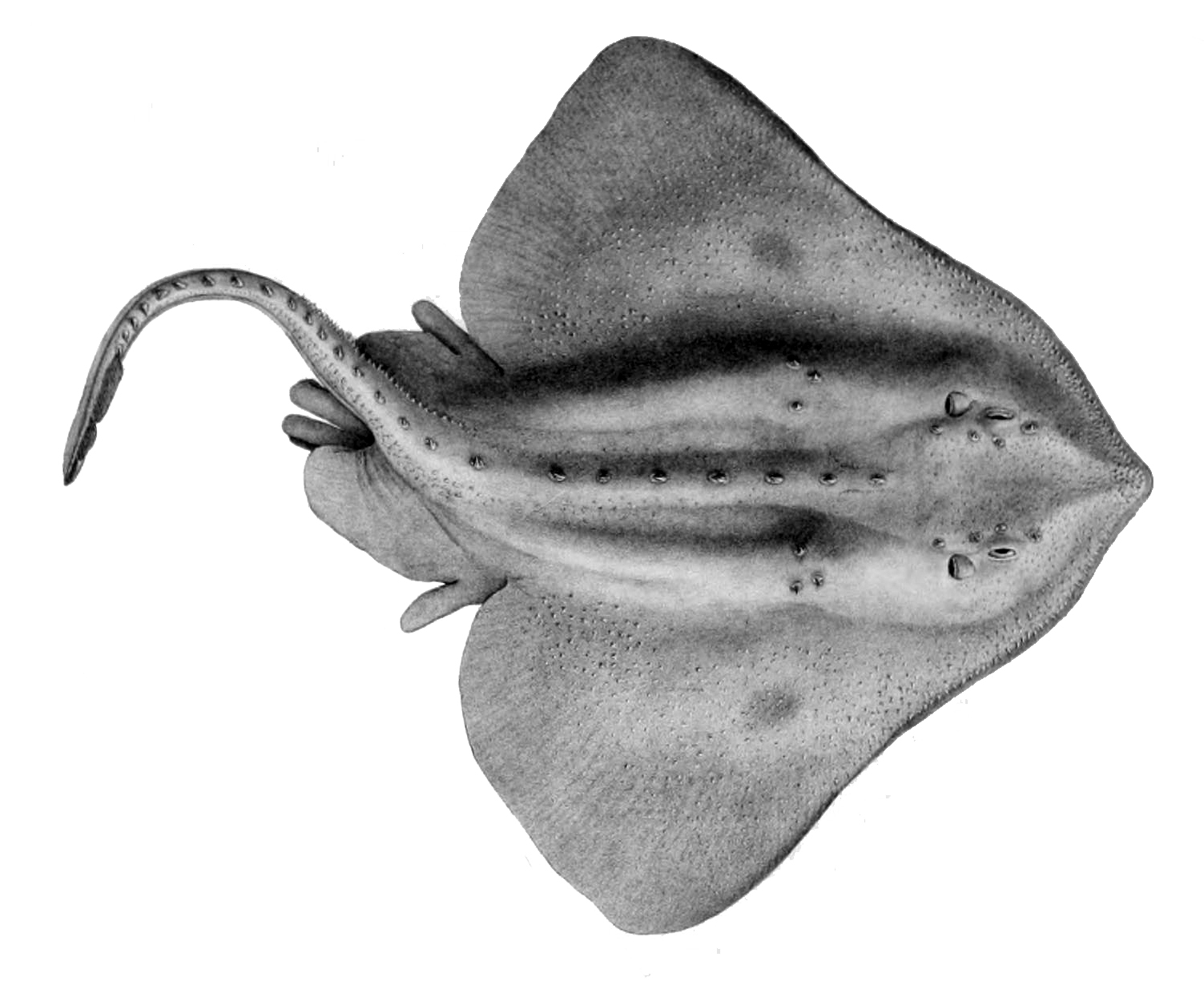
Arctic skate, Amblyraja hyperborea, a member of the genus Cruriraja, family Rajidae

== Taxa named in his honor ==
Hulley is honoured in the naming of a legskate and other fishes:

- Eustomias hulleyi - Goman & Gibbs 1985
- Antigonia hulleyi - Parin & Borodulina 2005
- Argyripnus hulleyi - Quéro, Spitz & Vayne, 2009
- Roughnose Legskate Cruriraja hulleyi - Aschliman, Ebert & Compagno 2010
- Diogenichthys hulleyi - Schwarzhans 2013

== Taxa described by him ==
Hulley discovered and named several other sharks and fish, amongst others:

- Taillight Shark genus Euprotomicroides - Hulley 1966
- Bottleneck Skate genus Rostroraja - Hulley 1972
- Taillight Shark Euprotomicroides zantesdeschia - Hulley & Penrith 1966
- Roberts Bigmouth Skate Amblyraja robertsi - Hulley 1970
- Yellow-spotted Skate Leucoraja wallacei - Hulley 1970
- Ghost Skate Rajella dissimilis - Hulley 1970
- Smoothback Skate Rajella ravidula - Hulley 1972
- African Pygmy Skate Neoraja stehmanni - Hulley 1972
- Lanternfish genus Krefftichthys - Hulley 1981
- False-Midas lanternfish Gymnoscopelus hintonoides - Hulley 1981
- Minispotted lanternfish Gymnoscopelus microlampas - Hulley 1981
- Nacreous lanternfish Lampanyctus vadulus - Hulley 1981
- Herwig lanternfish Metelectrona herwigi - Hulley 1981
- Gaptooth lanternfish Protomyctophum choriodon - Hulley 1981
- Jewelled lanternfish Protomyctophum gemmatum - Hulley 1981
- Damsel lanternfish Protomyctophum luciferum - Hulley 1981
- Krefft's lanternfish Symbolophorus kreffti - Hulley 1981
- Astronesthes illuminatus - Parin, Borodulina & Hulley 1999
- Astronesthes galapagensis - Parin, Borodulina & Hulley 1999
- See Category:Taxa named by P. Alexander Hulley

== External references ==
- Publications by P. Alexander Hulley at ResearchGate
- Publications by P. Alexander Hulley on Semantic Scholar
