= Spit =

Spit or Spits may refer to:

== Common uses ==
- Spit (archaeology), a term for a unit of archaeological excavation
- Spit (landform), a section of land that extends into a body of water
- Spit or rotisserie, a rotating device used for cooking by roasting over an open fire
- Spit, another word for saliva
  - Spitting, the act of forcibly expelling saliva from the mouth

== Places ==
=== Antarctica ===
- Spit Point (Greenwich Island)

=== Australia ===
- Spit Bay, Heard Island
- Spit Bridge, Sydney, NSW
- Spit Nature Conservation Reserve, Victoria
- Spit Point, Heard Island

=== Canada ===
- Spit Island, Nunavut

== People ==
- Michal Špit (born 1975), a Czech footballer

== Arts, entertainment, and media ==
=== Music ===
- S.P.I.T. (music), a methodology for learning music
- Spit (album), the first album by Canadian metal band Kittie
- "Spit", a song by American rock band KISS from Revenge
- "Spit", a song by Brazilian metal band Sepultura from Roots
- "Spit", a song by NY Loose from The Crow: City of Angels (soundtrack)
- Spit, another word for rapping

=== Film ===
- S.P.I.T.: Squeegee Punks in Traffic, a 2001 Canadian documentary film by Daniel Cross
- Spit (2025 film), an Australian comedy crime thriller film

=== Other uses in arts, entertainment, and media ===
- Spit (card game)
- Spit! (comics), a British adult comic
- Spits (newspaper) (1999–2014), a defunct Dutch newspaper
- Spit the dog, puppet sidekick of entertainer Bob Carolgees

== Other uses ==
- Spit (nightclub), in Levittown, New York
- Spit (VoIP spam), an unsolicited telephone call made using IP telephony
- Spit hood, restraint device
- Supermarine Spitfire, British fighter aircraft (ICAO aircraft type designator SPIT)

== See also ==
- Spitting Image (disambiguation)
- Spitz (disambiguation)
- The Spit (disambiguation)
- The Spits, a Seattle-based band
- SIPT (disambiguation)
