= SIPT =

SIPT may refer to:

- Sukhumi Institute of Physics and Technology, research institution in Tbilisi, Georgia
- SITP, station code for Siddipet railway station in Telangana State, India
- Supervised In-Plant Training, a program at Don Bosco Technical College

== See also ==
- SPIT (disambiguation)
- "Sip It", 2021 song by Iggy Azalea and Tyga
