= Imagery (disambiguation) =

Imagery is a literary technique.

Imagery may also refer to:

- Imagery (album), a 1997 album by death-metal band Neuraxis
- Imagery (sculpture), sculpture focused in religious topics

== See also ==
- Image
- Images (disambiguation)
