= Spit Bay =

Bay on Heard Island

Spit Bay (53°6′S 73°45′E) is an open bight formed by the northeast coastline of Heard Island and Spit Point, the east extremity of the island. The name derives from the conspicuous Elephant Spit which forms the south and east shore of the bight, and may have been given by American sealers at Heard Island in the period following their initiation of sealing there in 1855. The name appears on a chart by the British, who utilized many names then in use by the sealers. Heard Island and McDonald Islands are located in the Southern Ocean, approximately 1,700 km (1,100 mi) from the Antarctic continent and 4,100 km (2,500 mi) southwest of Perth. As the only volcanically active subantarctic islands, they "open a window into the earth", thus providing the opportunity to observe ongoing geomorphic processes and glacial dynamics. The distinctive conservation value of Heard and McDonald – one of the world's rare pristine island ecosystems – lies in the complete absence of alien plants and animals, as well as human impact.
