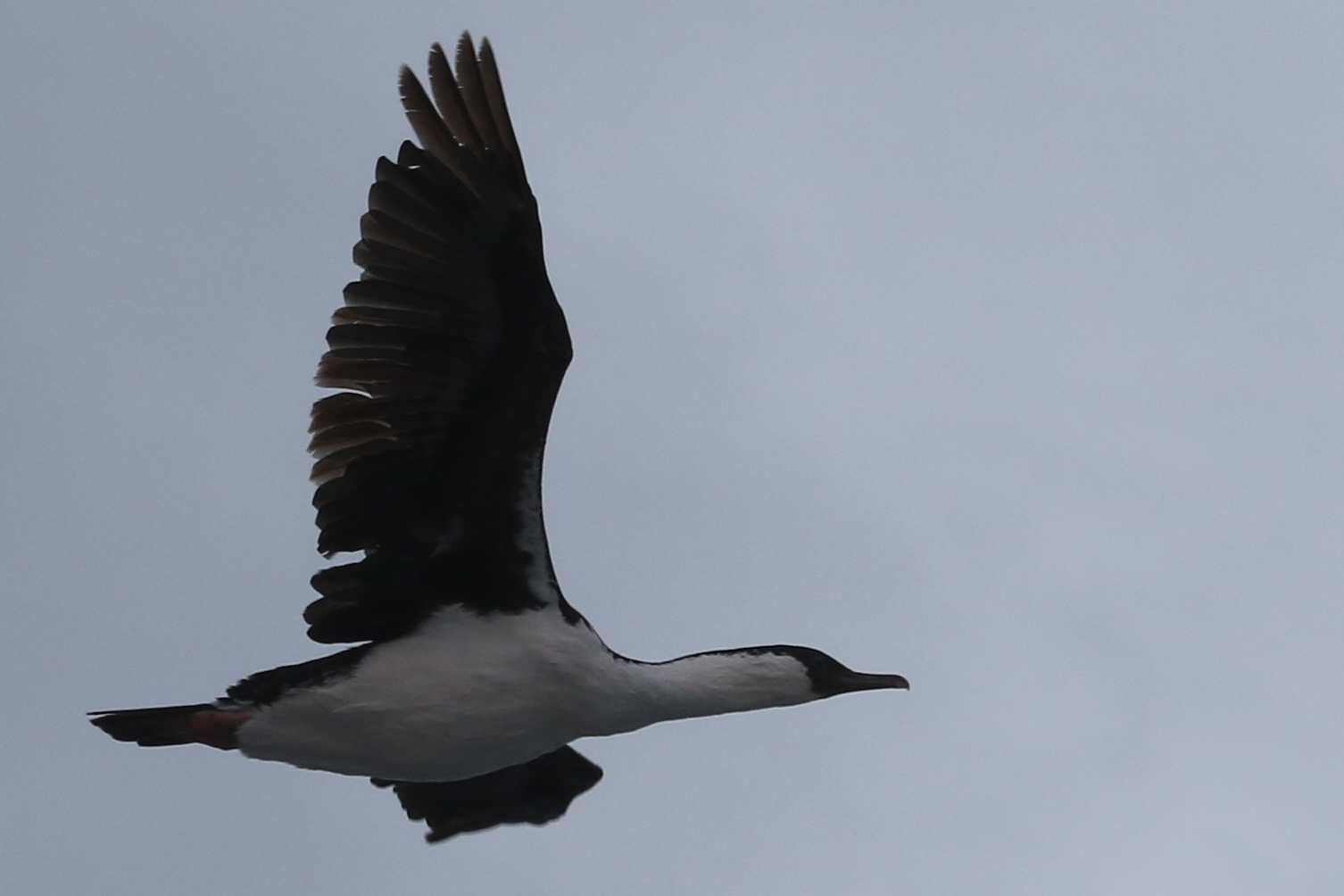

Scientific classification
- Kingdom: Animalia
- Phylum: Chordata
- Class: Aves
- Order: Suliformes
- Family: Phalacrocoracidae
- Genus: Leucocarbo
- Species: L. nivalis

Binomial name
- Leucocarbo nivalis (Falla, 1937)

Synonyms
- Phalacrocorax atriceps nivalis; Phalacrocorax nivalis; Leucocarbo atriceps nivalis

= Heard Island shag =

Species of bird

The Heard Island shag (Leucocarbo nivalis), or Heard Island cormorant, is a marine cormorant native to the Australian territory comprising the Heard and McDonald Islands in the Southern Ocean, which is about 4,100 km south-west of Perth, Western Australia.

== Taxonomy ==
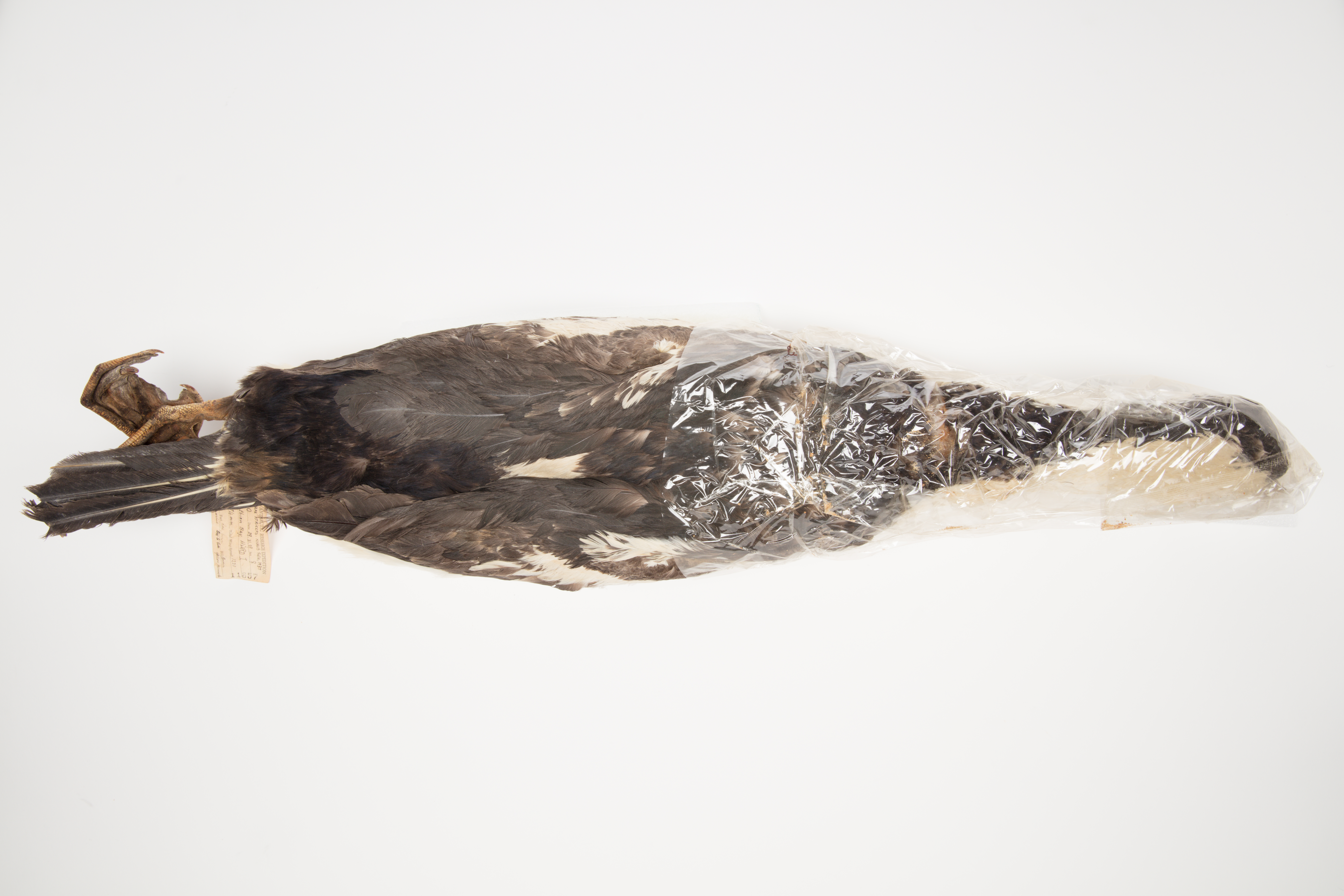
Taxidermy specimen

The Heard Island shag is one of the blue-eyed shags, sometimes placed in the genus Leucocarbo, and sometimes as a subspecies of the imperial shag. Others place it in the genus Phalacrocorax. It is now usually considered to be a full species.

== Distribution and habitat ==
The Heard Island shag is restricted to the subantarctic Heard and McDonald Islands, and is known to breed only on Heard Island. Apart from breeding and roosting, its habitat is marine.

== Description ==
The Heard Island shag has largely black upperparts and white underparts. The cheeks and ear-coverts are white; there are white bars on the wings, a black, recurved crest over the forehead, and pink feet. A breeding adult has a pair of orange caruncles above the base of the bill in front of the eyes as well as blue eye-rings. It is about 77 cm in length, with a wingspan of 120 cm and a weight of 3 kg.

== Behaviour ==
Heard Island shags are gregarious, roosting in groups of from 10-20 birds up to several hundred.

=== Breeding ===
The birds are present year round at Heard Island, where they breed annually in colonies. Courtship takes place from late August to early October. Nests are mounds built largely of the stipes, roots and adhering soil of the tussock grass Poa cookii and average about 22 cm high, with a minimum distance between nests of 50 cm. The clutch of two or three eggs is laid mainly between mid-September and November, hatching from November to February. The chicks fledge from January to March.

=== Feeding ===
The birds forage locally in shallow coastal waters, with the diet consisting primarily of polychaetes and fish. The proportion of fish in the diet is higher when the birds are feeding chicks.

== Status and conservation ==
The Heard Island shag population is estimated to comprise about 1000 breeding pairs. It is listed as Vulnerable under Australia's Environment Protection and Biodiversity Conservation Act 1999, because the population is small, localised and subject to fluctuations in breeding success due to weather conditions and food availability. A potential threat is climate change affecting sea temperatures and thus food supply.
