= Spit Point =

Point on Heard Island, Antarctica

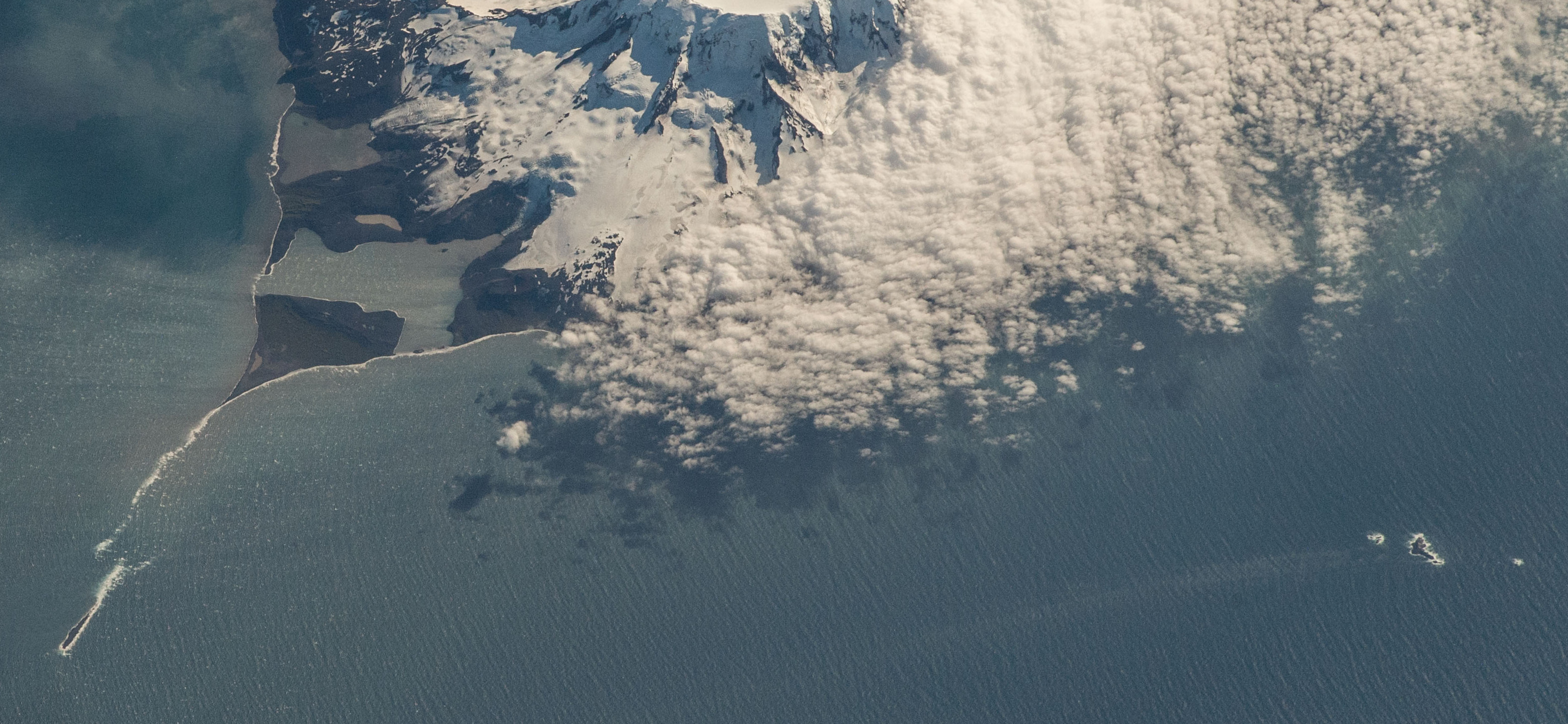
Stephenson Lagoon and Winston Lagoon, Elephant Spit with Spit Point - an island (view from space station)

Spit Point (53°7′S 73°51′E) is the east tip of the 5-nautical-mile (9.3 km; 5.8 mi) long Elephant Spit, a conspicuous spit at the eastern end of Heard Island. The feature was charted by early American sealers at Heard Island in the years following initiation of sealing operations there in 1855. The descriptive name was apparently given some years later and is now established in usage.
