= Spitting Image (disambiguation) =

Spitting Image is a 1984–1996 British satirical television puppet show.

Spitting Image or The Spitting Image may also refer to:

- Spitting Image (2020 TV series), a revival of the original series
- Spitting Image (video game), a 1989 fighting game featuring the puppet show
- Spitting Image (album), by the Strypes, 2017
- The Spitting Image, a 1998 book by Jerry Lembcke
- Spitting Image, a 1968 stage play by Colin Spencer
- "Spitting Image", an episode of Mona the Vampire
- "Spitting Image" (瓜二つ, "Urifutatsu"), a chapter of Japanese serialized manga One Piece
- "Spitting Image" (German: Ebenbild), a song by Megaherz off the 2008 album Heuchler
- a doppelgänger, replica, or lookalike, a spitting image of an original

== See also ==
- Image (disambiguation)
- Spit (disambiguation)
