= Ilia Vekua =

Georgian mathematician

- Born: 6 May [O.S. 23 April] 1907; Shesheleti, Gali District, Georgia
- Died: 2 December 1977 (aged 70); Tbilisi, Georgia
- Education: Tbilisi State University
- Scientific career
- Fields: Mathematics

Ilia Vekua (Georgian: ილია ვეკუა; Russian: Илья́ Не́сторович Ве́куа; 6 May [O.S. 23 April] 1907 in the village of Shesheleti, Kutais Governorate, Russian Empire (modern day Gali District, Abkhazia, Republic of Georgia – 2 December 1977 in Tbilisi, USSR) was a distinguished Georgian mathematician and engineer, specializing in partial differential equations, singular integral equations, generalized analytic functions and the mathematical theory of elastic shells.

Ilia Vekua was born in 1907 in the Georgian village Sheshelety. After finishing school in Zugdidi, he entered Physics and Mathematics Department at Tbilisi State University. Vekua graduated in 1930 and was made a professor there in 1940. He was also deputy-director of the Steklov Institute of Mathematics (1954–1959), the first rector of Novosibirsk State University (1959–1964), and vice-president (1964–1965) and president (1972–1977) of the Georgian Academy of Sciences. In 1969 he became the Hero of Socialist Labour. Vekua was awarded the Stalin Prize (1950), Lenin Prize (1963), USSR State Prize (1984), three Orders of Lenin and the Order of the Badge of Honor. The Sukhumi Institute of Physics and Technology, formerly near Sukhumi (Abkhazia), now in Tbilisi/Georgia, which was involved in the nuclear weapons program of the Soviet Union, is also named after him.

== See also ==
- Georgian National Academy of Sciences
- Complex analysis
- Solomon Mikhlin
- Linear elasticity
