= Image (disambiguation) =

An image is an artifact that depicts visual perception, such as a photograph or other two-dimensional picture.

Image or IMAGE may also refer to:

== Arts, entertainment and media ==
=== Media brands and companies ===
- Image, an imprint of Crown Publishing Group
- Image Channel, a Nepali television channel
- Image Comics, an American comic book company
- Image Entertainment, a home video and television distribution company

=== Music ===
- Image (album), a 1992 album by Luna Sea
- An Image: Lee Konitz with Strings, a 1958 album by Lee Konitz
- "Image", a song by P.O.D. on the album The Fundamental Elements of Southtown
- "Image" (song), by Magdalena Bay from Imaginal Disk, 2024

=== Literature ===
- Image (journal), an American quarterly literary journal
- Image (Irish magazine), an Irish lifestyle and fashion magazine
- Image (Finnish magazine), a Finnish lifestyle and cultural magazine
- Image (Angel novel), a 2002 original novel based on the U.S. television series Angel

=== Other uses in arts, entertainment and media ===
- Image (board game), a 1972 board game by 3M

== Science and technology ==
=== Computing ===
- Card image, a character string that was, or could be, contained on a single punched card
- Disk image, a computer file containing the complete contents and structure of a data storage device
- Docker (software), a file which represents containerized application
- Executable, a computer file containing an executable program
- Image file formats, standardized means of storing digital picture
- ISO image, a disk image representing an optical disc
- RAM image, a sequence of machine code instructions kept on ROM and moved to the RAM for use
- ROM image, a computer file which contains a copy of the data from a read-only memory chip
- Single system image, a cluster of computers that appear to be a single computing system
- System image, the state of a computer or software system stored in some form
- Tape image, an image of the contents of a computer's magnetic tape
- IMAGE (database), a network database program for the HP 3000 systems

=== Mathematics ===
- Image (category theory), a generalization of the image of a function
- Image (mathematics), subset of a function's codomain
- Image (matrix), or column space of a matrix

=== Optics ===
- Digital image, a discrete representation of a picture as used in computing
- Mirror image, a virtual image "behind" a mirror
- Photograph, an image created by light falling on a light-sensitive surface or an electronic imager
- Real image, an image formed by rays of light that intersect at the image, as in a camera or eye
- Virtual image, an image formed by rays that do not intersect at the image

=== Other uses in science and technology ===
- IMAGE (spacecraft), a NASA spacecraft that observed the Earth's magnetosphere 2000–2005
- Image frequency, an undesired input frequency in radio reception

== Other uses ==
- Selwyn Image (1849–1930), English clergyman, designer of stained glass windows, and poet
- Mental image, a picture in one's mind
- Reputation, a social evaluation of a person

== See also ==
- Images (disambiguation)
- Spitting Image (disambiguation)
- Computer-generated imagery
- Digital imaging
- Imagery
- Painting
