= The Spit =

The Spit could be:

- Southport Spit, Queensland, a permanent sand spit that separates the Southport Broadwater from the Pacific Ocean
- The Spit, New South Wales, an urban locality in the suburb of Mosman, New South Wales
- Leslie Street Spit, a man-made peninsula in Toronto, Canada
- Spithead, a point on the Hampshire shore in England
- Revenge of the Spit, a Ras Kass mixtape
- The Spits, a Seattle based punk musical group
- The Spitting Image, a 1998 book by Vietnam veteran Jerry Lembcke

== See also ==
- Spit (disambiguation)
