= Heard Island and McDonald Islands =

External territory of Australia

Territory of Heard Island and McDonald Islands
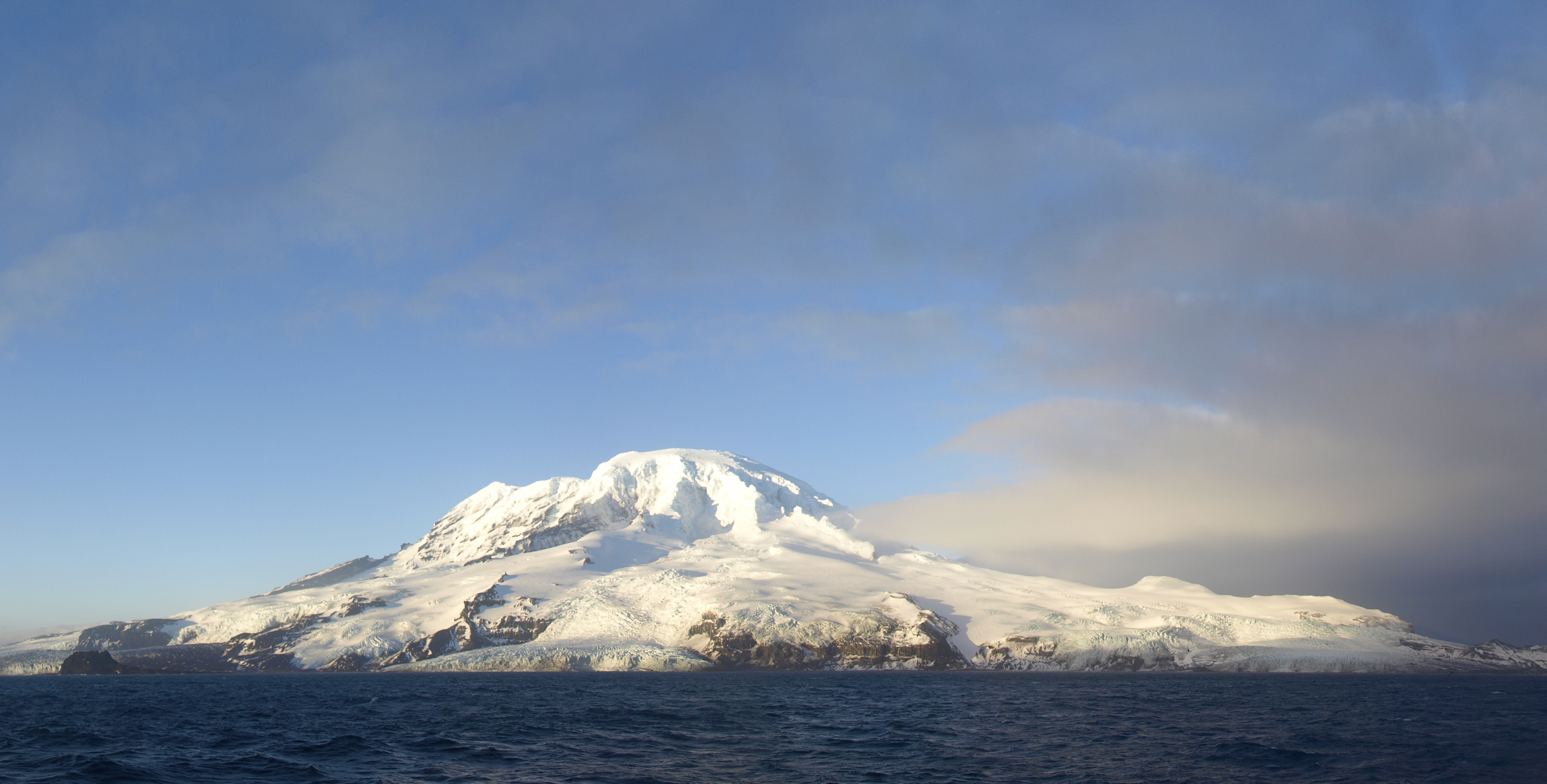
- Heard Island

Geography
- Location: Southern Indian Ocean
- Coordinates: 53.075°S 73.500°E
- Area: 368 km^{2} (142 sq mi)

Administration
- Australia

Demographics
- Population: 0

Additional information
- Postcode: TAS 7151 (localities of Heard Island / McDonald Islands)
- ISO code: HM

UNESCO World Heritage Site
- Criteria: Natural: viii, ix
- Reference: 577
- Inscription: 1997 (21st Session)
- Area: 658,903 ha (1,628,180 acres)

The Territory of Heard Island and McDonald Islands is an Australian external territory in the southern Indian Ocean. Discovered in the mid-19th century, the territory is a group of sub-Antarctic volcanic islands that lie on the Kerguelen Plateau. It is about 4000 kilometres (2500 mi) south-west of the Australian mainland and 1700 kilometres (1100 mi) north of Antarctica. The territory contains Australia's only active volcanoes and is home to its highest point outside the Australian Antarctic Territory, Mawson Peak. The territory is uninhabited and has been described as one of the remotest places on Earth.

The first confirmed sightings of Heard Island and the McDonald Islands took place in the 1850s. Heard Island was occupied by sealers until 1882 and saw occasional scientific visits in the late 19th and early 20th centuries. The territory was claimed by the United Kingdom and was then transferred to Australia in 1947. Between 1947 and 1955, the Australian National Antarctic Research Expeditions (ANARE) occupied a research station on the island. Since the closure of the ANARE research station, the islands have been visited by occasional scientific and private expeditions. Today, the islands are a nature reserve and World Heritage Site managed by the Australian Antarctic Division.

Heard Island is dominated by Big Ben, a stratovolcano that is topped by the volcanic cone Mawson Peak. About 70 percent of the island is covered by year-round glaciers, while vegetation occupies just 5 percent. The island is volcanically active, with Mawson Peak regularly emitting steam and vapour and occasionally releasing flows of lava. The McDonald Islands, located about 43 kilometres (27 mi) to the west of Heard Island, are a group of smaller volcanic islands that have seen just two recorded human landings. Heard Island and the McDonald Islands are known for their harsh climate, characterised by low temperatures, strong winds, and heavy rain and snow.

Heard Island and the McDonald Islands are home to a large number of eastern rockhopper, gentoo, macaroni, and king penguins. With more than one million breeding pairs, Heard Island contains about 20 percent of the world's macaroni penguins. The islands also contain substantial populations of elephant seals and Antarctic fur seals. They are a breeding site for at least 15 flying seabird species, including the Heard Island cormorant, a species unique to Heard Island. Commercial fishing of Patagonian toothfish and mackerel icefish takes place in the surrounding waters. Heard Island has seen melting of its glaciers and other environmental changes since the mid-20th century, probably due to climate change and volcanic activity.

== History ==
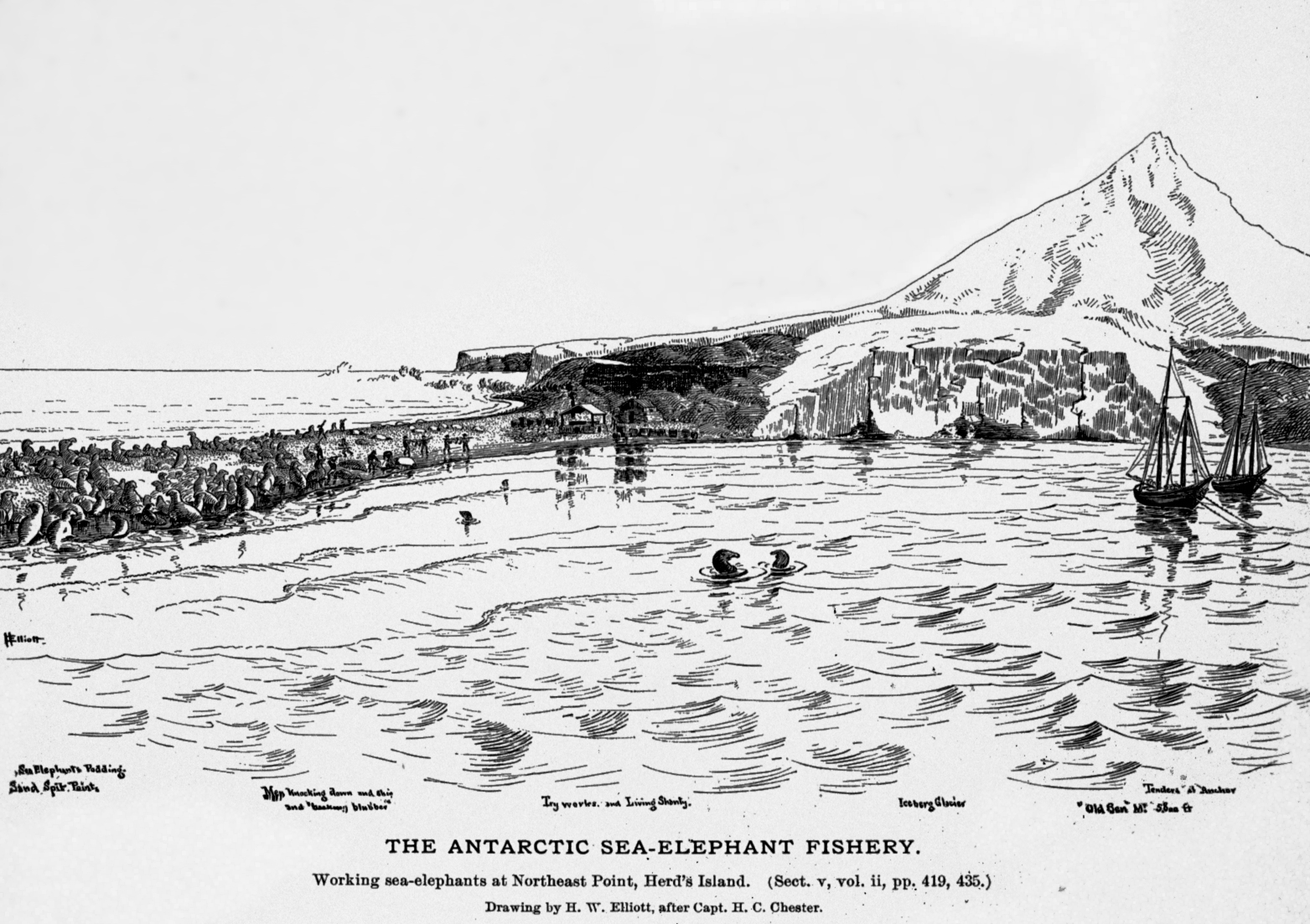
1887 drawing of Heard Island

The first confirmed sighting of Heard Island took place in 1853 when the island was spotted by the American captain John Heard aboard Oriental. Other sailors had reported observing land south of the Kerguelen Islands during the 1830s and 1840s, but whether they in fact sighted Heard Island is unclear. Researchers have suggested that earlier sightings of the island may have been kept secret for commercial reasons, but no evidence has been found on the island of human inhabitation or visitation prior to the 1850s. Heard named the island Heard Island and claimed it for the United States, but the country's government declined to endorse the claim. In 1854 the British captain William McDonald sighted the McDonald Islands aboard Samarang; he likewise named the islands after himself. A party of sealers led by the American captain Erasmus Darwin Rogers of the ship Corinthian made the first recorded landing on Heard Island in 1855.

Sealers continued to occupy the island over the following decades, with more than 40 vessels collectively making over 100 visits to hunt elephant seals and process their blubber into oil. Between 1855 and 1880, more than 16 million litres (100,000 barrels) of oil were produced on the island. At the peak of production in 1859, there were 24 vessels stationed at Heard Island. The majority of the sealing companies were American and were based out of ports in New England, although some of the sealers were from Cape Verde. The island was also exploited by Australian sealers, including James William Robinson, who conducted an expedition on behalf of the Tasmanian merchant William Crowther in 1858. Robinson wrote a memoir about the expedition, which is now held by the W. L. Crowther Library. During the sealing period 14 ships were wrecked near the island. According to one estimate, 30 sealers died on Heard Island between 1857 and 1881 and 30 died on their way to the island, largely after being washed overboard. By the 1880s the elephant seal population on the island had been severely depleted and sealing activity declined substantially.

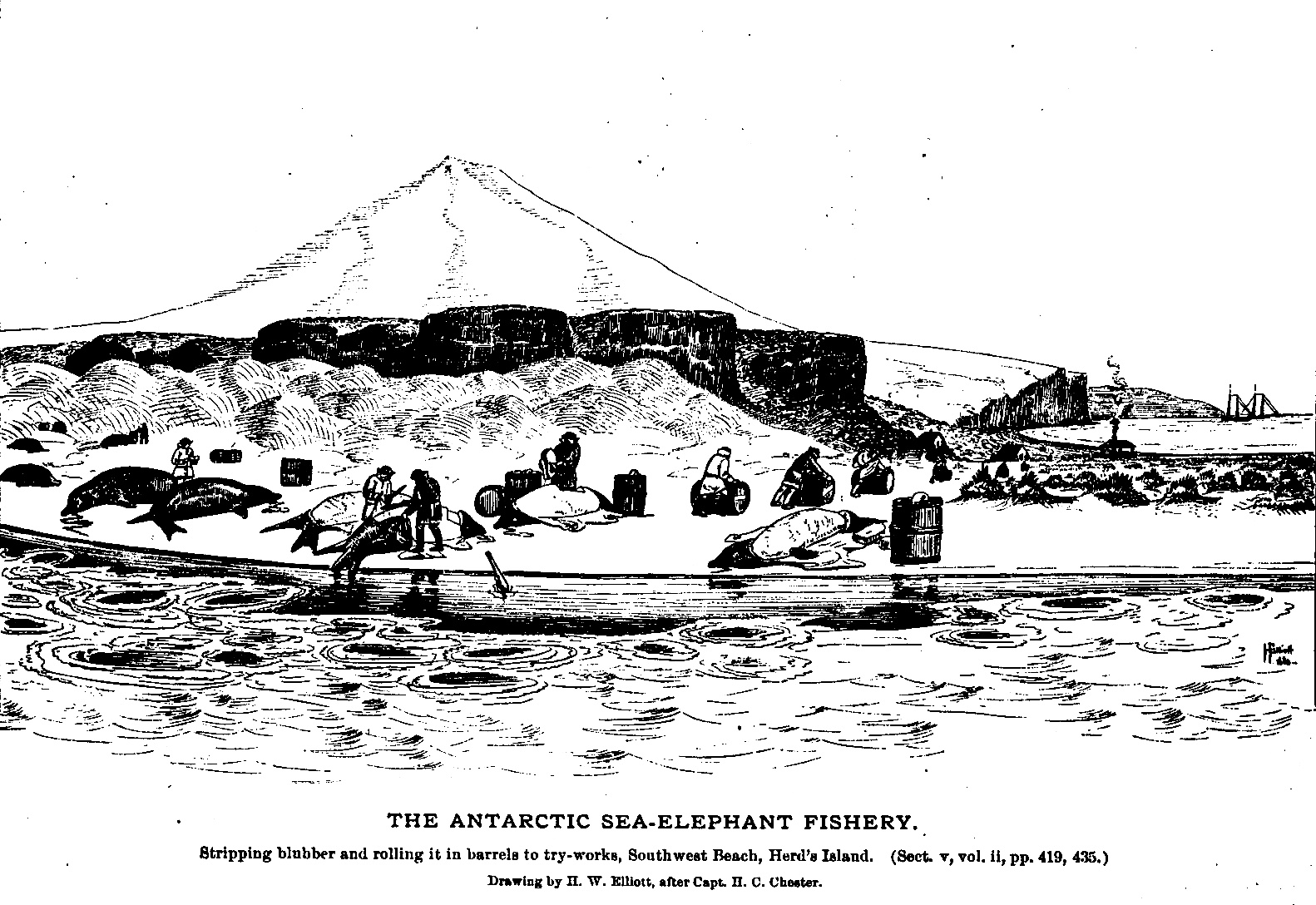
Processing of elephant seals on Heard Island

Brief scientific expeditions to Heard Island took place in 1874, 1902, and 1929, with their observations limited to the north-western side of the island. The first two expeditions were undertaken by the ships Challenger and Gauss in 1874 and 1902 respectively; each remained at Heard Island for just a few hours. Two scientific parties landed on the island in 1929 and remained for eight days: one was led by the Swiss geologist Edgar Aubert de la Rüe, while the other was composed of members of the British Australian and New Zealand Antarctic Research Expedition (BANZARE) party. The BANZARE party had planned to spend just three days on the island, but were forced by poor weather to remain for an additional five days. Between 1907 and 1930, some sealing activity resumed on the island and whaling ships made occasional visits.

Heard Island and the McDonald Islands were claimed by the United Kingdom in 1908. The British flag was raised on Heard Island in 1910 and 1929, and between 1910 and 1926 the British government issued licences for sealing and whaling on the island. A British company was allowed to lease the islands from the British government in 1926, although by 1930 it was no longer exercising its lease. By the 1930s the British government felt that Australia's proximity to its Antarctic possessions would provide a firmer claim to sovereignty, particularly over sectors of the Antarctic continent, and would reduce the logistical complexity of administering the territories. After Britain's transfer of the Australian Antarctic Territory to Australia in 1933, the Australian government began preparing to also take possession of Heard Island and the McDonald Islands.

ANARE researchers Stuart Campbell and L. Macey opening a post office

On 11 December 1947 a party of 14 men from the Australian National Antarctic Research Expeditions (ANARE), led by Stuart Campbell, landed at Atlas Cove on Heard Island and established a research station. The goal of the expedition was to establish an observatory on the island, reinforce Australia's strategic and economic interests in the territory, and lay the foundations for a permanent ANARE presence on the Antarctic continent. They raised the Australian flag and conducted weather observations, performed geological and wildlife surveys, and mapped the island over the next 14 months. The station was occupied until 1955 by a rotating series of seven ANARE parties, each of which spent 12–14 months on the island. On 19 December 1950 the territory was transferred from Britain to Australia via an exchange of notes, with the transfer backdated to December 1947. The Australian government passed the Heard Island and McDonald Islands Act in 1953 to establish a mechanism for the administration of its newly acquired territory.

The ANARE expedition parties operated a radio outpost and weather monitoring station on Heard Island and conducted research. Beginning in 1950 they also bred and trained sled dogs, many of which eventually supported Australian stations on the Antarctic continent. The ANARE station, which eventually grew to about 25 buildings, was closed in 1955 to fund the establishment of Mawson Station on the Antarctic continent. Much of the equipment on Heard Island was also transferred to Mawson Station.

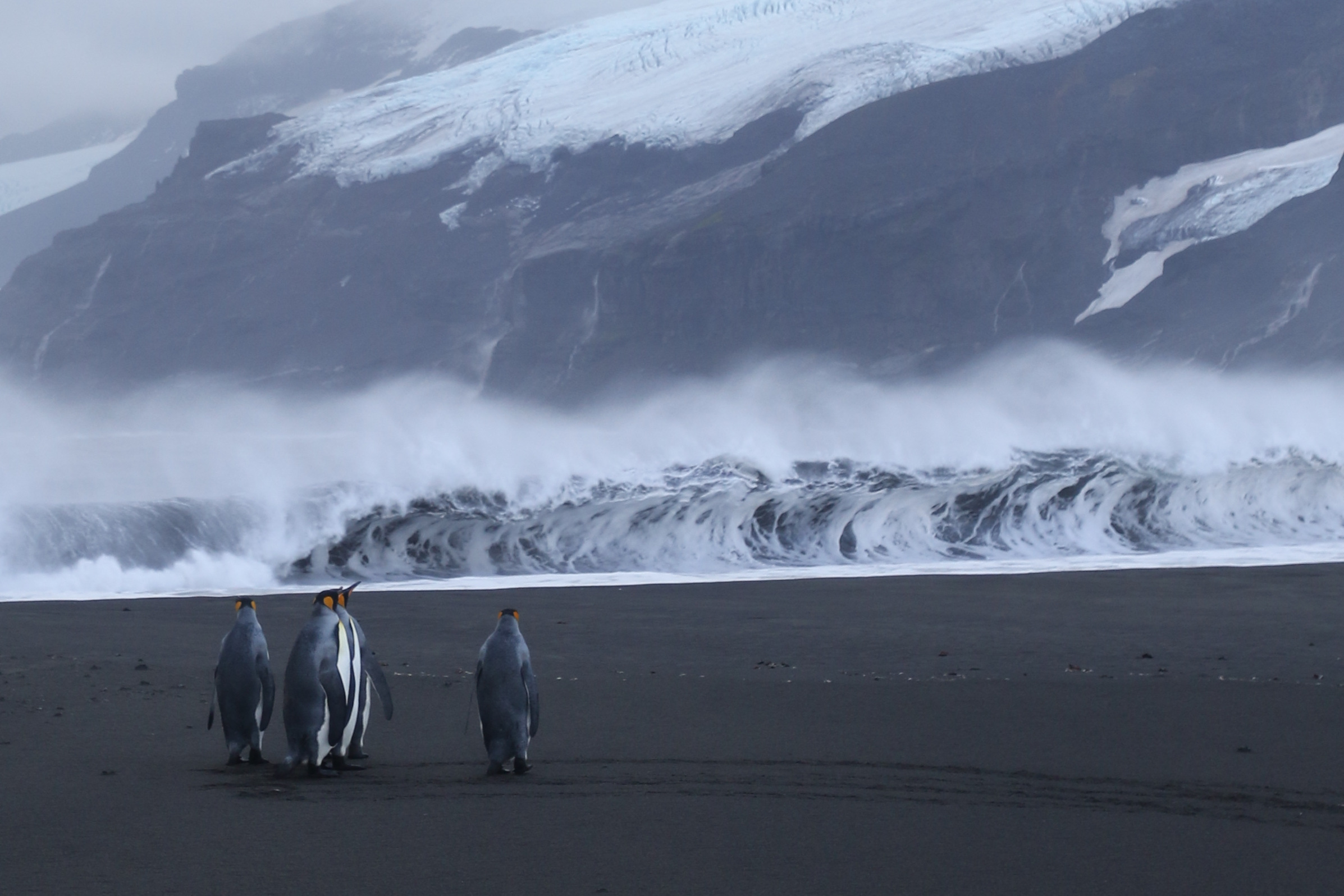
King penguins at Corinthian Bay during a 2016 private expedition to Heard Island

Nineteen short research expeditions to the island took place between 1956 and 2004. In 1992, one of these expedition parties remained on the island over the winter for the first time since the closure of the ANARE station in 1955. Infrequent visits by tourists and private expeditions have also taken place since 1963. The island was the site of the 1991 Heard Island feasibility test, which investigated whether transmission of acoustic signals through the ocean could be used to study changes in ocean temperatures. The islands were inscribed on the World Heritage List in 1997. In the same year, the Australian ship Austral Leader began commercial fishing in the surrounding waters.

The Heard Island and McDonald Islands Marine Reserve was established in 2002 and was the world's largest marine protected area at the time. The establishment of a marine reserve had been proposed in 2000 as part of a report commissioned by the Australian government, and was intended to protect the territory's marine fauna and comply with Australia's obligations under the Convention on Biological Diversity. In October 2025 and January 2026 the Australian Antarctic Division conducted voyages to Heard Island on RSV Nuyina, marking the first environmental management visits to the island in more than two decades. The scientists conducted wildlife and vegetation surveys, removed more than 1 tonne (2,200 lb) of waste and asbestos from the island, and installed equipment to allow for remote monitoring of the ecosystem. The visit provided scientists with confirmation that H5 bird flu had reached the island.

== Human activity ==
=== Governance and administration ===
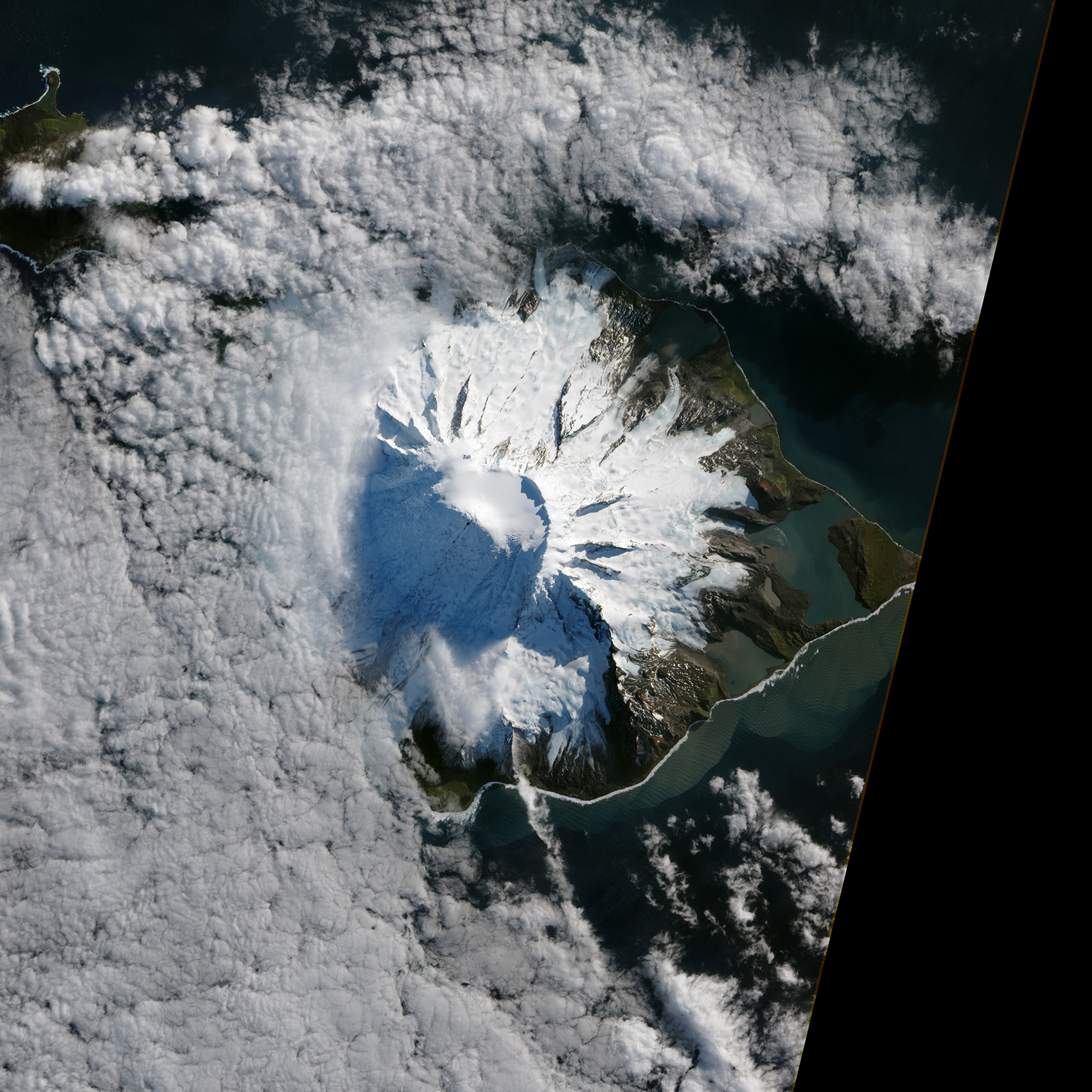
Satellite image of Heard Island

The Territory of Heard Island and McDonald Islands is one of seven Australian external territories. The islands and the surrounding waters form an uninhabited strict nature reserve managed by the Australian Antarctic Division, part of the Department of Climate Change, Energy, the Environment and Water. Unauthorised entry to the territory has been prohibited since May 2014, and all visitors to the islands are required to complete a training program and comply with quarantine procedures. Despite these restrictions, some unauthorised landings on the islands are known to have taken place. While the frequency of these unauthorised visits is unknown, they have been identified as a potential biosecurity risk to the territory. There have been just two recorded successful human landings on the McDonald Islands, which took place in 1971 and 1980. The Heard Island and McDonald Islands Marine Reserve was established in October 2002 and was expanded in 2014 and 2025. It now covers an area of about 380,000 square kilometres (150,000 sq mi) and sits within the 410,722-square-kilometre (158,581 sq mi) Australian exclusive economic zone (EEZ) that surrounds the islands.

The Australian parliament passed the Heard Island and McDonald Islands Act in 1953 to establish a legal framework for the administration of the territory. This was followed by the 1987 Heard Island and McDonald Islands Environment Protection and Management Ordinance and then by the first Heard Island Wilderness Reserve Management Plan in 1995. The territory is governed by the non-criminal laws of the Australian Capital Territory and by the criminal laws of the Jervis Bay Territory. Commonwealth laws apply to the territory only if it is explicitly included within their jurisdiction. The Governor-General of Australia is also able to issue ordinances for the administration of Heard Island and McDonald Islands under the Heard Island and McDonald Islands Act 1953. The Environmental Protection and Biodiversity Conservation Act 1999 serves as the main legislative framework for the environmental conservation of the territory.

In April 2025, a ten percent tariff was imposed on the territory by the administration of US President Donald Trump. This was attributed to erroneous data indicating that the US had imported US$1.4 million in goods (largely machinery and electrical imports) from Heard Island and McDonald Islands in 2022. At the time of the tariff imposition, there had been no known visits to the islands by humans in approximately ten years.

=== Maritime boundaries ===
Continental shelf claim from Heard Island and McDonald Islands

The Territory of Heard Island and McDonald Islands includes a territorial sea extending to a radius of 12 nautical miles (22 km) from the islands. This is surrounded by an Australian EEZ with a radius of 200 nautical miles (370 km), which borders the French EEZ generated by the Kerguelen Islands to the north-west. The Heard Island and McDonald Islands Marine Reserve, which covers about 90 percent of the Australian EEZ, includes a marine sanctuary zone (IUCN 1a) that encompasses the islands' territorial seas and a portion of the EEZ waters to the north of the islands, as well as a 140,000-square-kilometre (54,000 sq mi) national park zone (IUCN II) and a 170,000-square-kilometre (66,000 sq mi) habitat protection zone (IUCN IV). In 2012 Australia proclaimed an extended continental shelf covering an area of 1,130,000 square kilometres (440,000 sq mi) surrounding Heard Island and McDonald Islands, thereby claiming exclusive rights to harvest its seabed resources.

=== Fishery ===
While fishing is prohibited within the territorial waters of Heard Island and McDonald Islands, commercial fishing takes place elsewhere within the surrounding EEZ. The Heard Island and McDonald Islands Fishery is managed by the Australian Fisheries Management Authority (AFMA), which sets quotas on fishing catches and monitors compliance with the Convention on the Conservation of Antarctic Marine Living Resources. The species targeted are the Patagonian toothfish and the mackerel icefish. There are typically about 1–3 vessels harvesting Patagonian toothfish, primarily using longlines, and about 2–5 vessels gathering mackerel icefish, largely through trawl fishing, each year. Two AFMA observers are required to be present on each vessel. Bycatch of protected species has been identified as a possible threat to the sustainability of the Heard Island and McDonald Islands Fishery.

Illegal fishing has historically been reported near the islands, particularly by fishers targeting the valuable Patagonian toothfish. In October 1997 a vessel was arrested for unlicensed fishing within the Heard and McDonald Islands Australian Fishing Zone for the first time. That year, it was estimated that up to 70 vessels may have been operating illegally in the region. By 2004 eight vessels had been arrested near the islands, with seven of those arrests involving the Australian Defence Force. Australian civilian and military vessels have conducted patrols in the waters surrounding the islands to deter and respond to illegal fishing. Australia signed a treaty with France in 2003 to enable cooperation in surveilling and patrolling the waters around the islands, as well as the nearby French territory of the Kerguelen Islands. Since the mid-2000s, illegal fishing has reportedly been eliminated from the waters surrounding the Heard and McDonald Islands; as of 2019 there had been no reports of illegal fishing activity since 2006–2007.

=== Structures and archaeology ===
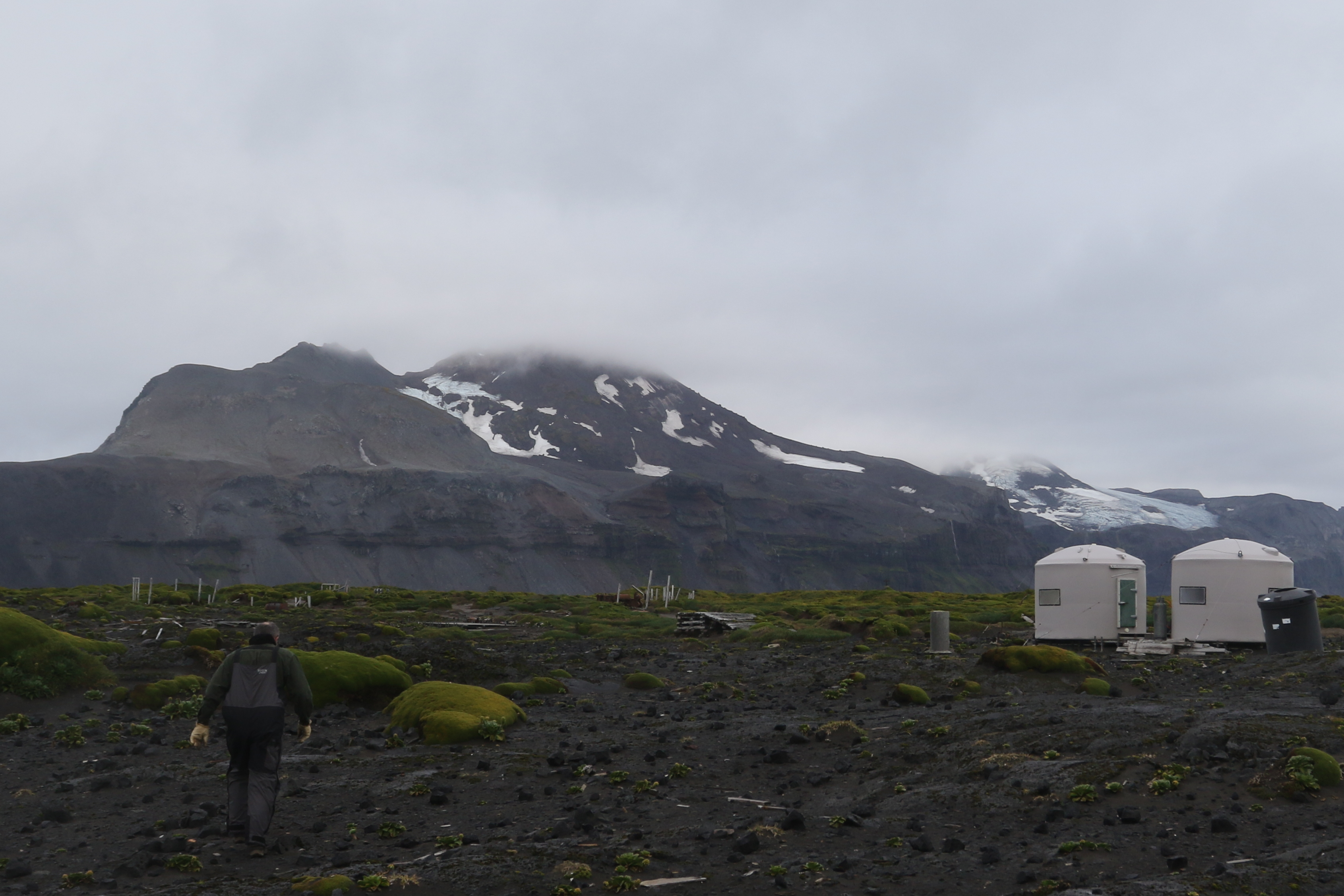
Atlas Cove, featuring modified water tank shelters and ruins of the ANARE research station

The first known human-made structures on Heard Island were rudimentary shelters dug into the ground by sealers in the 1850s. By the 1860s, sealers had begun to build above-ground shelters out of rocks, the remains of which are still visible on the island. A wooden hut may also have been constructed on the island by a shipwrecked party in the late-19th century. Some sealers constructed rudimentary stone platforms on which to work, while others modified lava caves to use as shelters.

One of the first conventional structures erected on Heard Island was Admiralty Hut, built in 1928 by the crew of the whaling ship Kildalkey under commission by the British Admiralty. The hut has been degraded by the weather over time and is now in ruins. The remains of the research station occupied by ANARE expedition parties between 1947 and 1955 have largely been cleared from the site by the Australian Antarctic Division, with only the ruins of the recreation hut still standing. More recent expeditions have used temporary fibreglass shelters that were removed after use, as well as modified water tanks. Five of these modified water tank shelters remain at Spit Bay, while two are present at Atlas Cove.

The island contains various pieces of machinery and equipment that have been left by past research expeditions, including the wreckage of a landing craft, a bulldozer, diesel generators, fuel barrels, and water tanks. Wooden debris from the wreckage of sealing vessels can be found on the shores of the island. There are also various artefacts on the island left by sealers, including try pots (large pots used for processing blubber into seal oil) and barrels. Some of these sealing artefacts have been taken to Australia, and a blubber press from the island is now held by a museum.

== Geography ==
=== Location and geography ===
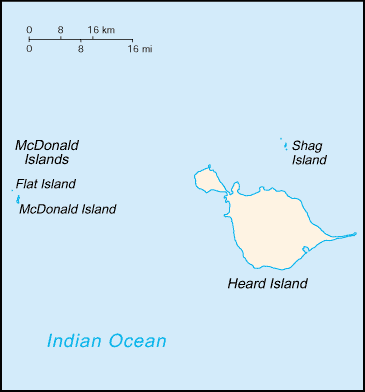
Map of Heard Island and McDonald Islands

Heard Island and the McDonald Islands lie in the southern Indian Ocean, about 4100 kilometres (2500 mi) south-west of Perth and 1700 kilometres (1100 mi) north of Antarctica. The closest land is the Kerguelen Islands, a French external territory, which are located about 450 kilometres (280 mi) to the north-west. The islands lie on the Kerguelen Plateau, a large igneous province that covers an area of about 2,000,000 square kilometres (770,000 sq mi). The territory includes Heard Island, Shag Islet, and the McDonald Islands. The islands are considered one of the most isolated places on Earth and contain the only active volcanoes in Australian territory.

Heard Island has an area of around 368 square kilometres (142 sq mi) and is largely made up of a 2745-metre (9006 ft) stratovolcano named Big Ben. With the exception of mountains in the Australian Antarctic Territory, (Note: While Australia claims sovereignty over the Australian Antarctic Territory, its claim is recognised by just four other nations.) its summit Mawson Peak is the tallest peak on territory claimed by Australia. The island contains a second volcanic cone with a height of 706 metres (2316 ft) named Mount Dixon on the Laurens Peninsula on the western side of the island. Its eastern side features a sand spit (a narrow sandbar projecting into the sea) named Elephant Spit. The island has a width of about 40 kilometres (25 mi) from east to west and is largely covered by glaciers, with about 70 percent of its land area permanently glaciated. It contains 15 wetland areas with areas of 5–145 hectares (12–358 acres), as well as a number of lagoons formed by glacial melting. These wetlands and lagoons have a total area of about 1860 hectares (4600 acres). Various volcanic features, including lava tube caves and cinder cones, are present on the island.

The McDonald Islands are a group of smaller volcanic islands located about 43 kilometres (27 mi) to the west of Heard Island. The group includes three islands: McDonald Island, Flat Island, and Meyer Rock. After a period of dormancy of around 75,000 years, volcanic activity resumed on the islands during the 20th century, with significant eruptions in 1992 and 1997. During the 1990s, this volcanic activity caused the islands to grow and rise in elevation by nearly 100 metres (330 ft), with the main island more than doubling in size and losing all of its vegetation. Between 1994 and 2004, McDonald Island grew from about 1 square kilometre (0.39 sq mi) to 2.5 square kilometres (0.97 sq mi) and became joined to the nearby Flat Island by an isthmus. The eruptions also created a new volcanic cone, several lava domes, and pumice rafts. The island is surrounded by cliffs with heights of up to 230 metres (750 ft) and has no permanent ice cover.

=== Formation and geology ===
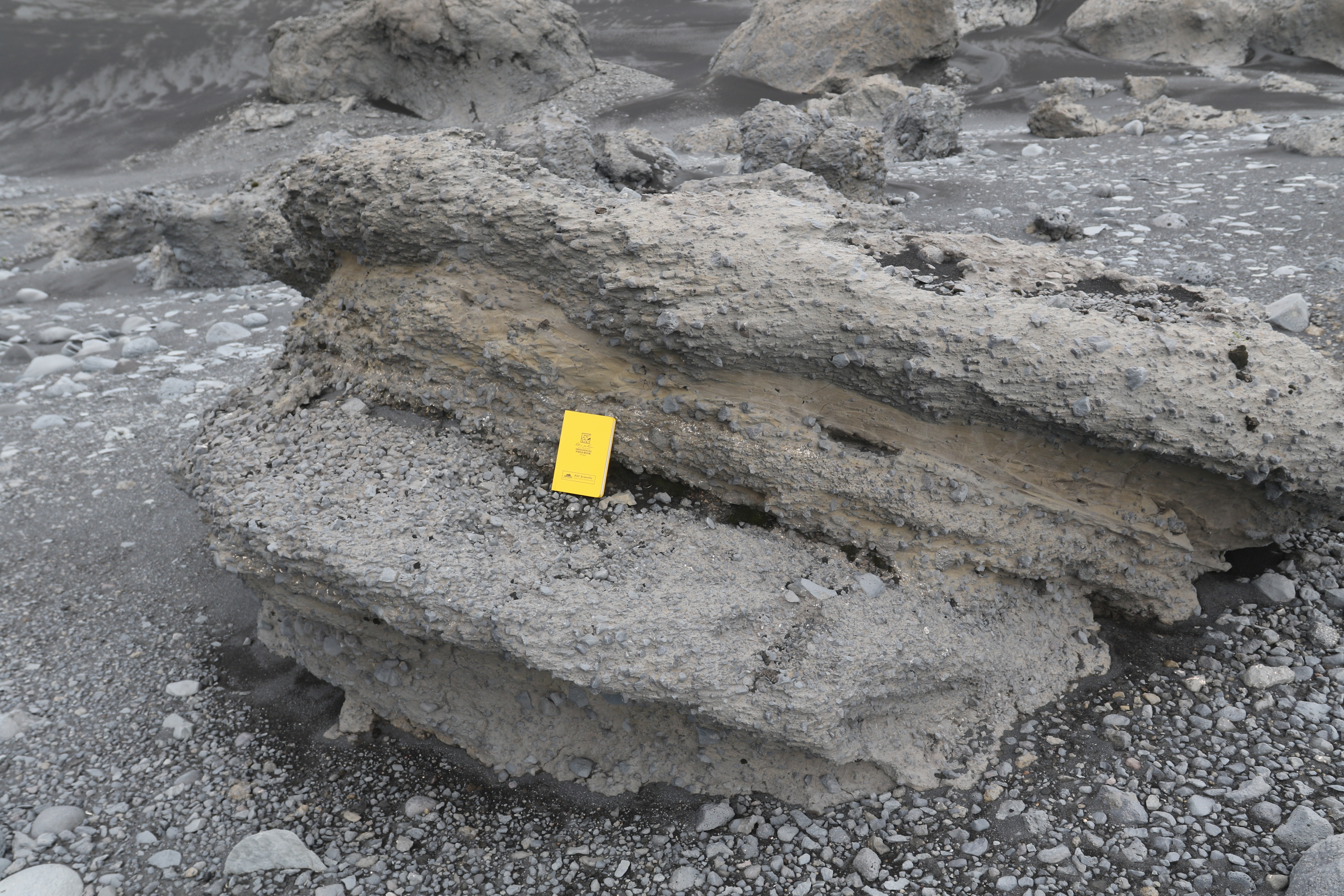
Exposed section of Drygalski Formation rock on Heard Island

Heard Island and the McDonald Islands lie on the Kerguelen Plateau, a large igneous province rising up to 3 kilometres (1.9 mi) above the surrounding ocean floor on the Antarctic Plate that began forming about 130 million years ago. Volcanic activity caused by the Kerguelen hotspot has created various islands rising above the ocean surface over time, including Heard Island and the McDonald Islands. A 2016 study estimated that Heard Island began to develop about 22 million years ago during the early Miocene period. The volcanic activity that formed Big Ben is believed to have occurred over the last 1 million years, while Mawson Peak, Mount Dixon, and the lava cones on the island formed as recently as the last 10,000 years. The McDonald Islands are also volcanic in origin and are believed to have formed within roughly the last 100,000 years. Rocks from Heard Island and the McDonald Islands form two distinct lava series; the newer lavas on Heard Island are primarily basaltic, while the lavas on the McDonald Islands are phonolitic. The Heard Island lava series includes basalts, trachybasalts, and basanites, while the McDonald Islands lava series is characterised by compounds of phonotephrite, tephriphonolite, and phonolite.

Heard Island's basement is made up of white and pink limestone likely deposited about 45–50 million years ago during the Paleogene period, which remains visible on parts of the Laurens Peninsula. On top of the island's limestone basement sits the Drygalski Formation, a layer of volcanic rock and sediment about 300–350 metres (980–1150 ft) in thickness that formed around 9 million years ago. The Drygalski Formation forms a plateau with exposed layers of rock along the island's northern coast. Volcanic activity on the island over the last million years has added another layer to the stratigraphy and created Big Ben and Mount Dixon, which lie on top of the Drygalski Formation's flat eroded base. Heard Island includes two distinct lava series: the lavas of Big Ben are primarily composed of alkali basalts, trachybasalts, and basanites, while the lavas on the Laurens Peninsula feature a distinct isotopic signature and more basanitic and trachytic compounds. According to one study, the distinct isotopic compositions of the lavas on Heard Island indicate that the mantle beneath the island contains traces of continental crust that were incorporated into the mantle sometime before the separation of the landmass Gondwana.

=== Big Ben ===
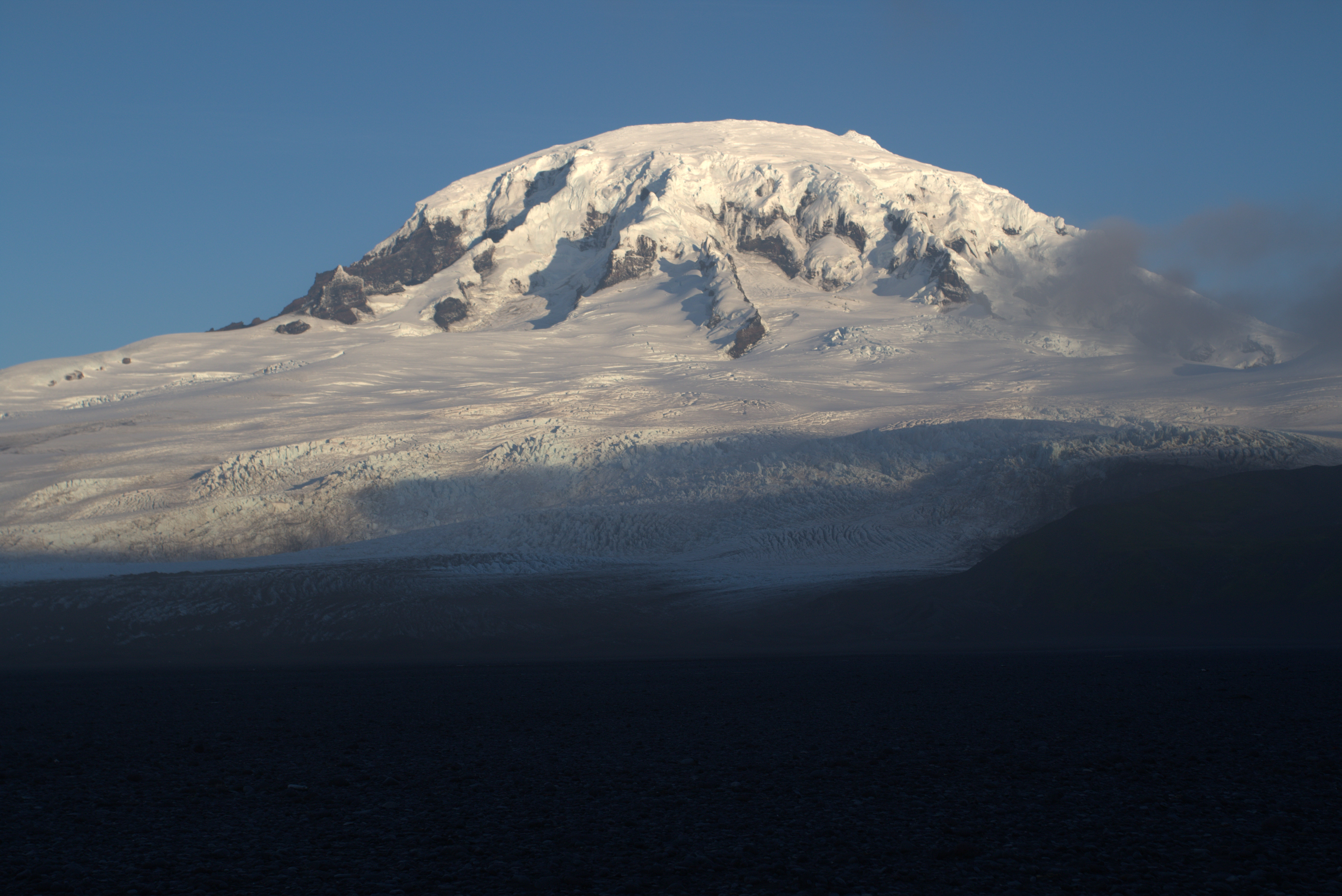
Big Ben stratovolcano on Heard Island

Big Ben is a volcanic massif that forms the majority of Heard Island's landmass. It has a plateau at a height of about 2285 metres (7497 ft) which is topped by Mawson Peak, an active volcanic cone. The plateau is believed to be the result of a sector collapse that occurred some time in roughly the last 40,000 years. The volcano has a diameter of about 18–20 kilometres (11–12 mi) and a height of 2745 metres (9006 ft). A 2021 study estimated that the age of two samples of lava taken from the volcano was around 11,100 and 23,900 years. The volcano has a relatively low average discharge rate of about 200,000 cubic metres (7,100,000 cu ft) of magma per year and forms part of one of the world's oldest plume systems.

Only three parties have successfully reached the summit of Big Ben. The first ascent was made by the Southern Indian Ocean Expedition in 1965, the second by the Anaconda expedition in 1983, and the third by the Australian Army Alpine Association in 1999–2000. The volcano frequently emits smoke and vapour and occasionally releases lava, typically down its south-western slopes. Flows of lava with lengths of 250–2000 metres (820–6560 ft) have occurred roughly once per year since 2008. The volcanic activity on Big Ben is primarily effusive, characterised by flowing lava, rather than explosive. Its peak has featured a crater of varying size and location; between 2000 and 2015 Mawson Peak was topped by an open crater containing a lava lake with a diameter of 45–200 metres (148–656 ft), while more recent observations have suggested that the crater may have been replaced by a fissure.

=== Glaciers ===
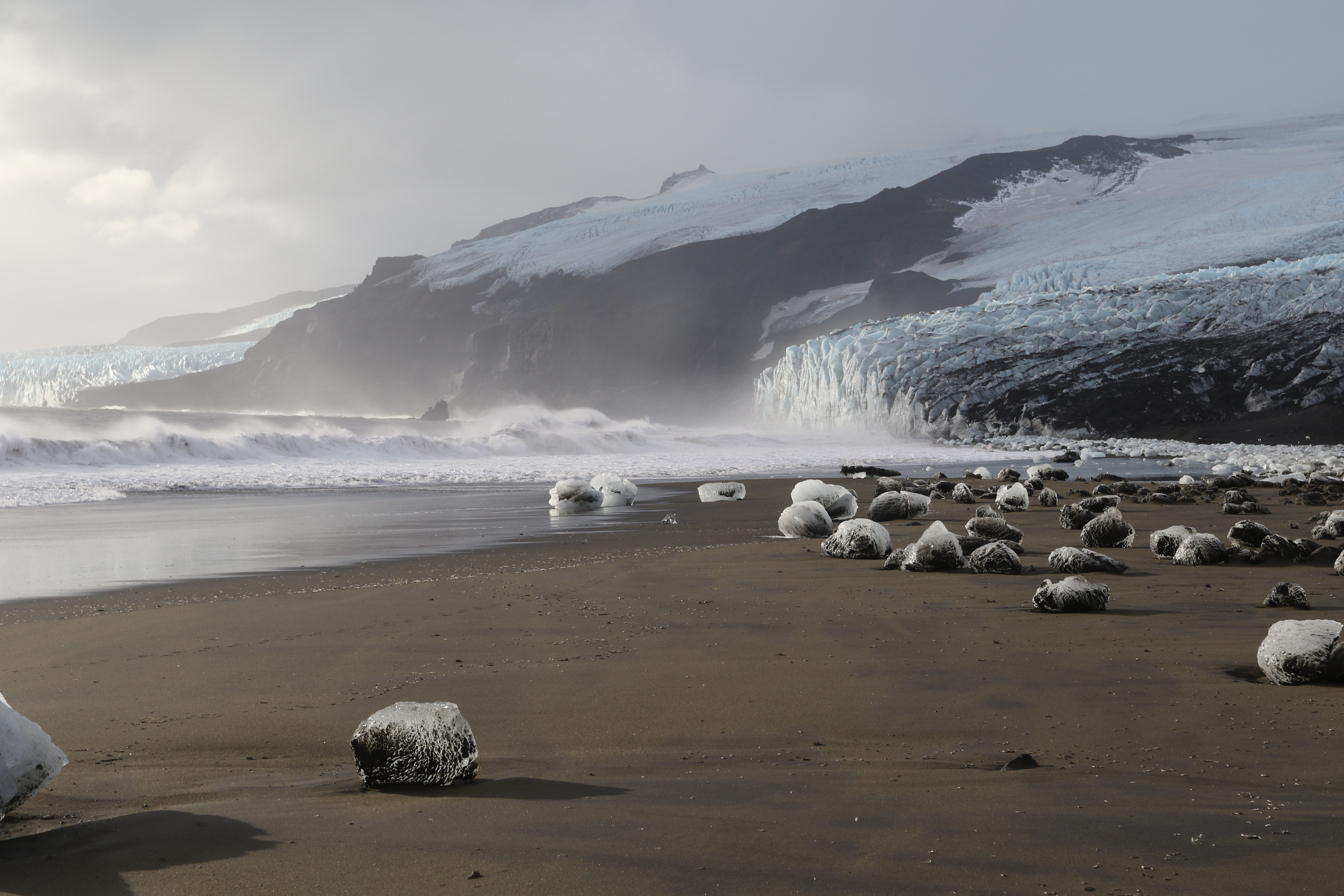
Coast of Heard Island

Heard Island has been covered by glaciers since as early as the Miocene epoch and experienced its most recent glacial maximum about 18,000 years ago. Heard Island has 12 major glaciers radiating outwards from the summit of Big Ben, which are sometimes divided by barriers of volcanic rock. A 2025 glacier mapping study identified around 30 glaciers. As of 1999, the longest of these glaciers had a length of 7 kilometres (4.3 mi). Parts of the island's coast are made up of ice cliffs with heights of up to 30 metres (98 ft). Other glaciers on Heard Island, primarily those that flatten into a shallow incline, terminate in moraines; these are primarily composed of sediment and debris, with relatively little till content. Most of the glaciers flowing from the summit of Big Ben have a narrow top and a slope of more than 30° near its peak, reducing to around 5° as they widen on its lower slopes. Due to Big Ben's steep slopes and the high levels of snowfall on Heard Island, its glaciers are fast-flowing and have a short residence time of about 100 years. The glaciers' shallowness and fast movement mean that they are particularly vulnerable to changes in climate.

Many glaciers on Heard Island have retreated by more than 1 kilometre (0.6 mi) since 1949, leaving substantial lagoons and lakes at their bases. One of the largest glaciers on Heard Island, Stephenson Glacier, ended in 15-metre (49 ft) ice cliffs in 1954, but by 1963 terminated 100 metres (330 ft) from the ocean behind a land barrier and a lagoon now known as the Stephenson Lagoon. Its rate of recession increased from an average of 18 metres (59 ft) per year between 1947 and 1987 to a rate of 100 metres (330 ft) per year between 1987 and 2000. Another glacier, Brown Glacier, lost 38 percent of its volume and 29 percent of its area while retreating by 1.17 kilometres (0.73 mi) between around 1950 and 2004. A 2025 study estimated that the annual rate of glacier loss had increased from 0.25 percent between 1947 and 1988 to 0.43 percent between 1988 and 2019. Total glacier area declined from an estimated 289.4 square kilometres (111.7 sq mi) in 1947 to 225.7 square kilometres (87.1 sq mi) in 2019, with smaller glaciers in low-lying areas near Laurens Peninsula the most affected.

=== Climate ===
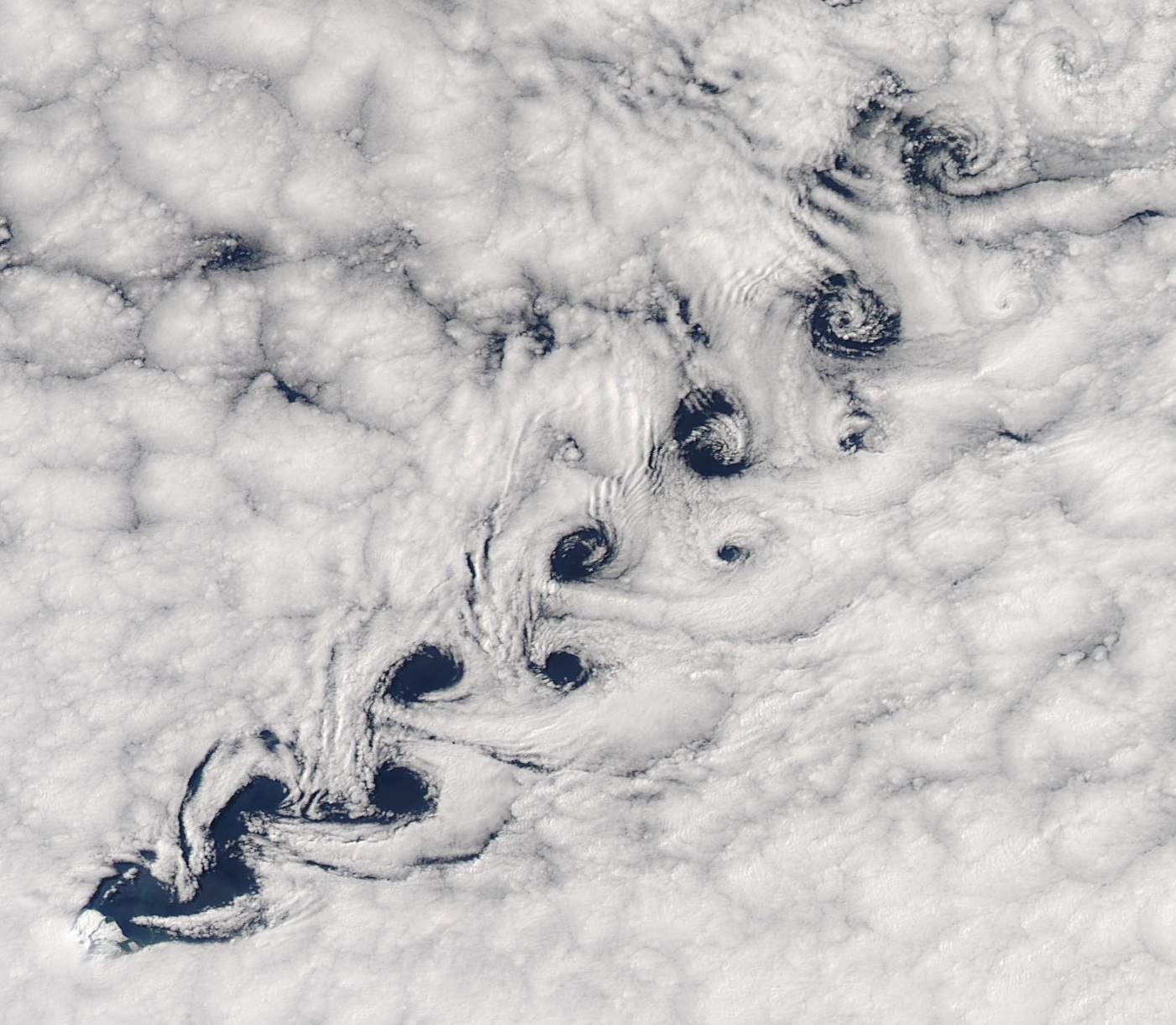
Kármán vortex street over Heard Island

The territory of Heard Island and McDonald Islands has an Antarctic climate. It experiences strong westerly winds, high precipitation, and heavy cloud cover. Average daily temperatures at Atlas Cove on Heard Island are between −0.8 °C (30.6 °F) and 0.3 °C (32.5 °F) in winter, and between 3.7 °C (38.7 °F) and 5.2 °C (41.4 °F) in summer. Monthly wind speeds range from 26 kilometres per hour (16 mph) to 33.5 kilometres per hour (20.8 mph) on average, with maximum daily gusts of up to 180 kilometres per hour (110 mph). The islands experience high snowfall and rainfall, with an average annual precipitation of 1.3–1.9 metres (4.3–6.2 ft) (water equivalent). Between 1948 and 1950 there was an average of just 1.7 hours per day of sunshine, ranging from 0.8 hours per day in June to 2.4 hours per day in November. Rain or snow was recorded on an average of 300 days each year. The territory has consistently high humidity, with relative humidity of about 85 percent.

While meteorological data for the island is incomplete, the average annual temperature on Heard Island is estimated to have increased by about 0.8 °C between the periods 1948–1954 and 1997–2005. Climate change is believed to be the main driver of glacier retreat on the island, although volcanic activity has also been suggested as a potential contributing factor. Climate change has also led to significant changes in the island's vegetation due to the creation of new ice-free land, lagoons, and lakes.

== Biodiversity ==
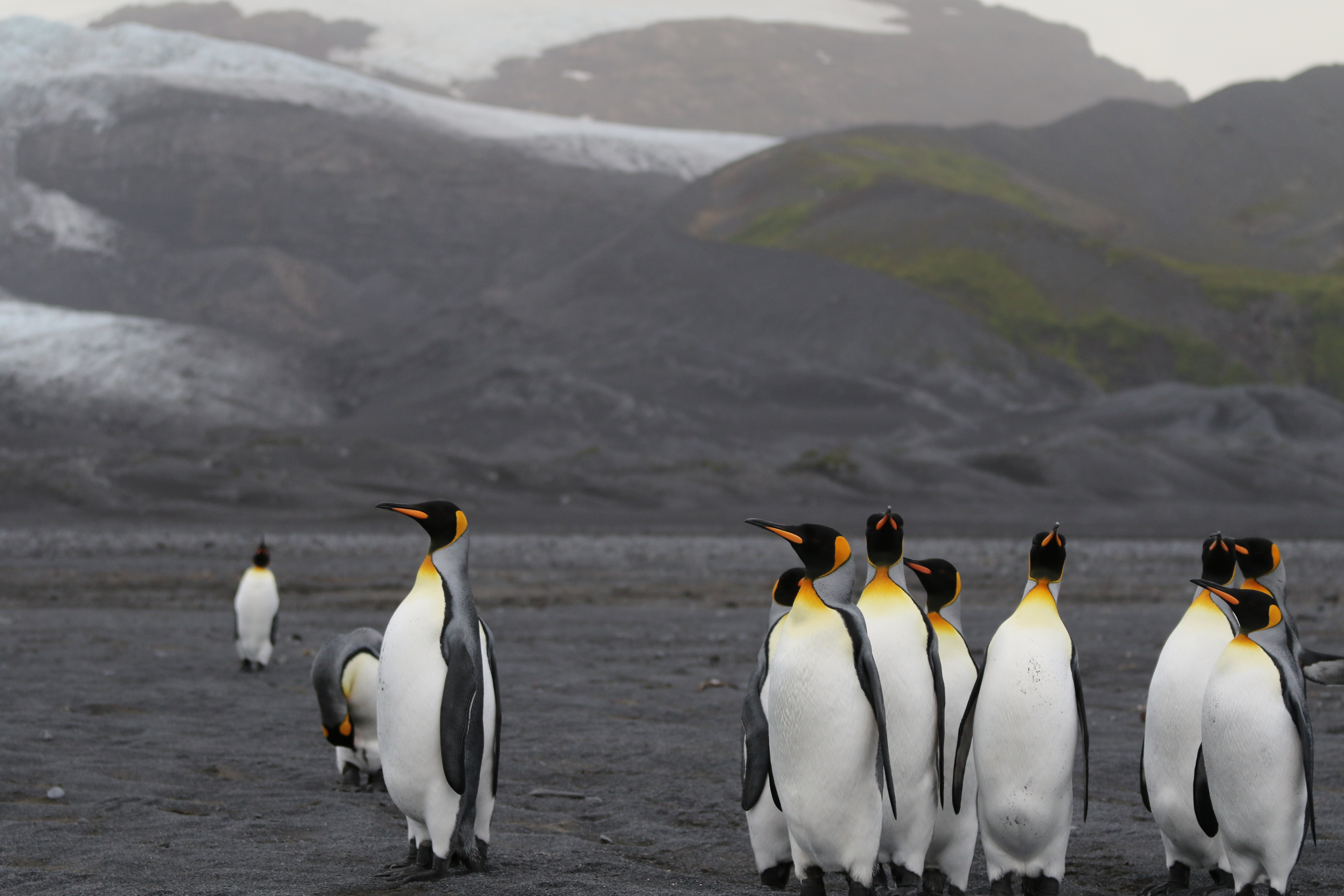
King penguin colony on Heard Island

Due to the territory's remoteness, scientific surveys of the Heard and McDonald Islands are infrequent and there is limited recent data on the islands' biodiversity. About 300 species are known to be present on Heard Island, although it is likely that there are others that have not yet been recorded. Heard Island and the McDonald Islands are the only sub-Antarctic islands that are not home to any species known to have been directly introduced by humans. (Note: The islands are home to one non-native plant species, Poa annua, which is believed to have been naturally introduced from the Kerguelen Islands by seabirds.) Various non-native animal species have been brought onto Heard Island by humans in the past, including dogs, sheep, and at least one rat, but none have established a presence on the island. The islands have relatively low species diversity. A 2021 study projected that climate change would cause the populations of penguins, flying birds, and seals on the island to decline. The population of toothfish in the surrounding waters was projected to fall by 20–60 percent, while the population of mackerel icefish was projected to fall by 20 percent.

=== Flora ===
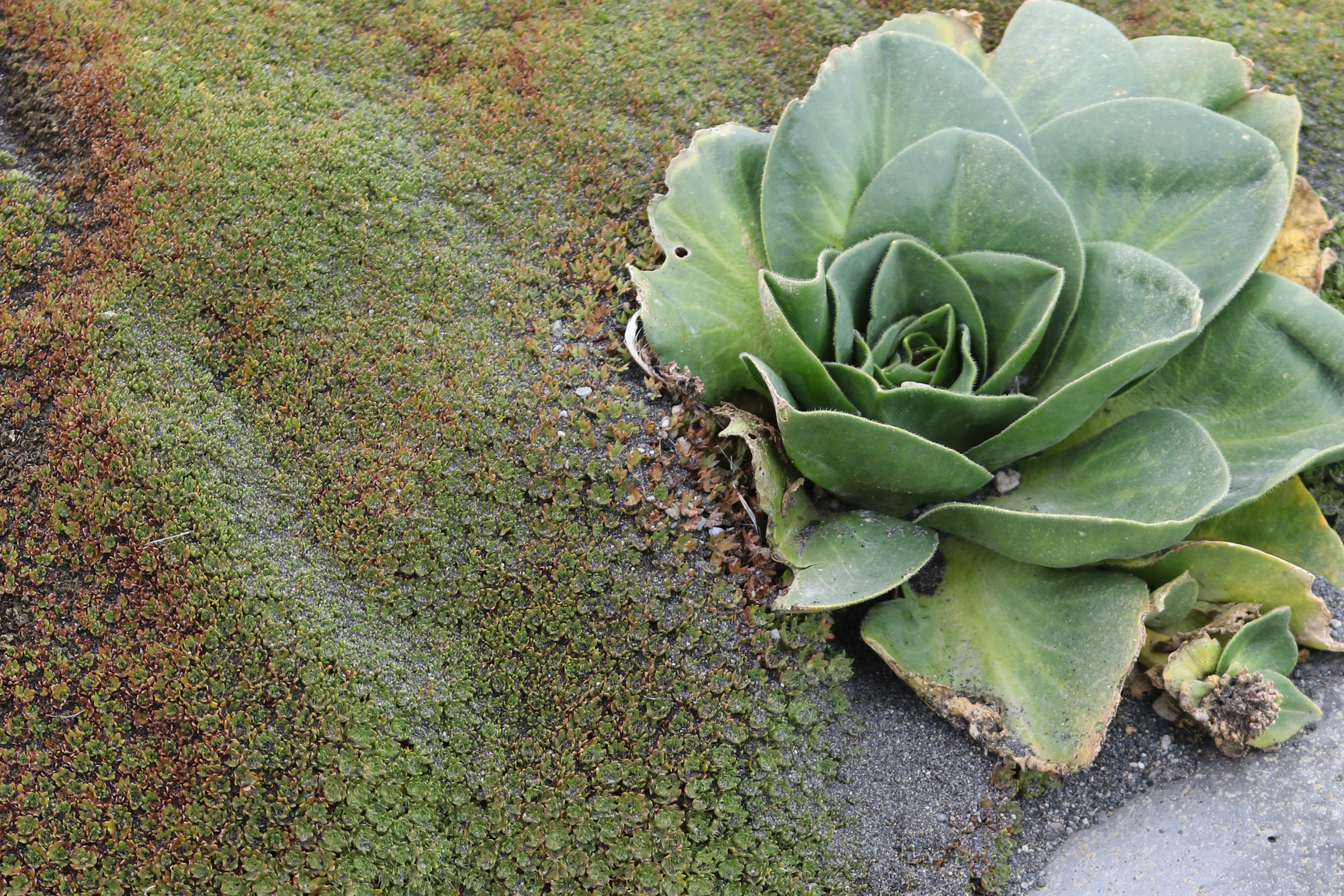
Azorella selago and Pringlea antiscorbutica on Heard Island

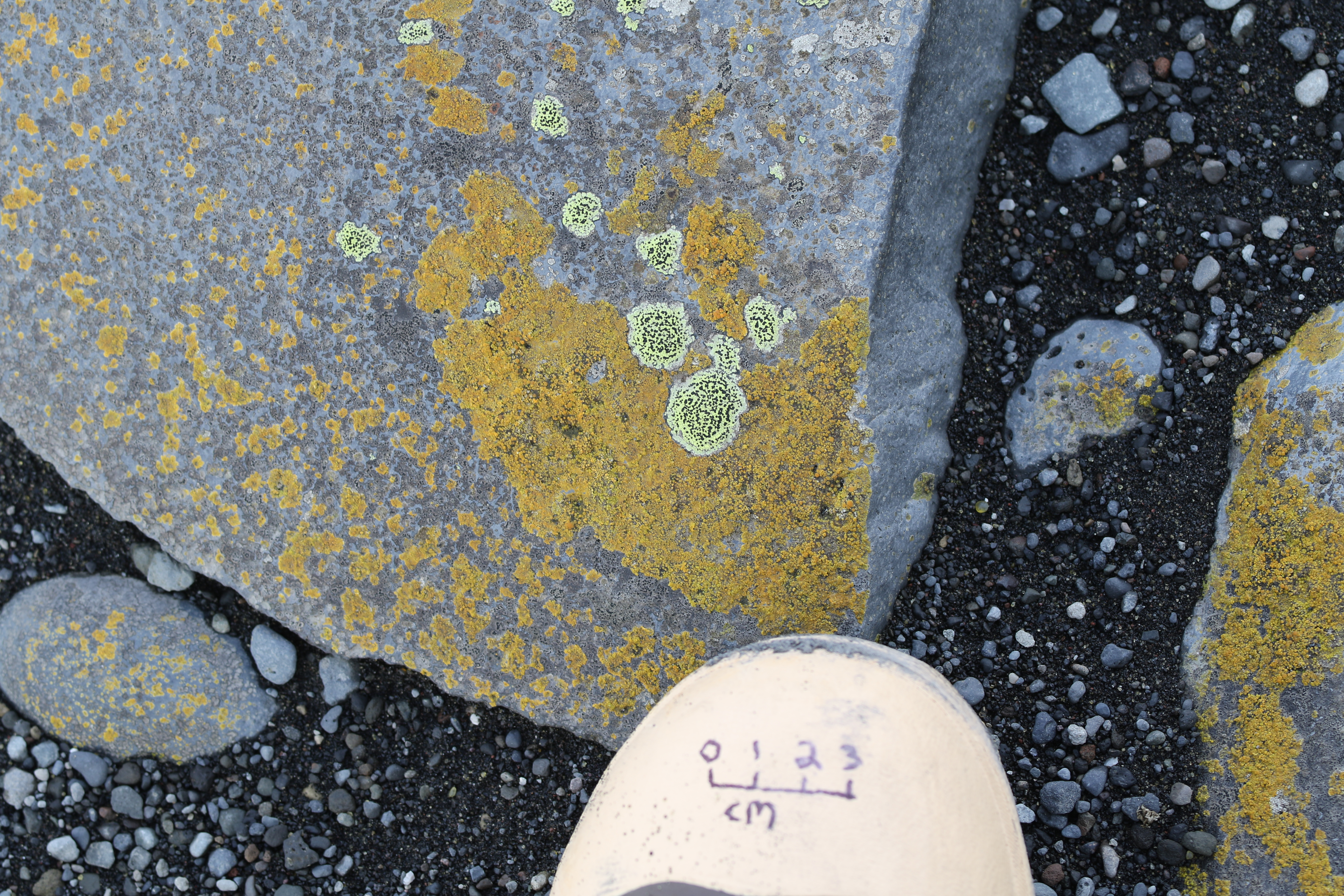
Lichens on a rock on Heard Island

The majority of the plant species on Heard Island are non-flowering plants, including bryophytes (a division of plants that includes liverworts and mosses) and lichens. At least 62 species of bryophyte and 90 species of lichen have been recorded on the island. There are just 12 species of vascular plants on Heard Island, 5 of which have also been recorded on McDonald Island. About 20 square kilometres (7.7 sq mi) or 5 percent of the island is covered by vegetation, mostly in low-lying coastal areas with elevations of less than 300 metres (980 ft). The Antarctic ecologists Dana Bergstrom and Patricia Selkirk have compared Heard Island to an archipelago of distinct vegetation communities separated by ice.

Researchers studying plant microfossils on Heard Island have suggested that several species of plant—including ferns, a podocarp, and a small herb—were present on the island between the late Eocene and early Pliocene periods. Volcanic activity over the last million years disrupted many of these early plant communities, and during colder periods in the Pleistocene epoch many plant species disappeared from Heard Island. Today, the level of vegetation on the island is increasing due to glacier retreat, which is making new land available for plant colonisation. Vegetation remains absent from some areas due to high levels of nitrogen, ammonia, and other compounds deposited by the island's large colonies of seabirds.

The most prevalent vegetation on the island is Azorella selago, a species of cushion plant. The majority of the other vascular plants on the island are small herbs and grasses, with the exception of Pringlea antiscorbutica (known as Kerguelen cabbage). The island does not contain any trees or shrubs. Pringlea antiscorbutica is present largely on gravel and sandy areas with high moisture and drainage, particularly on moraines. The island's grasses include Poa cookii, a small tussock grass, as well as tufts of Poa kerguelensis. The island's wetlands are characterised by the presence of the herb Callitriche antarctica. A non-native grass, Poa annua, has significantly expanded its presence on the island, including on formerly glaciated land. This expansion has led to fears of potential displacement of native plants.

The moss species present on Heard Island are relatively uniformly distributed across the island. The most widespread mosses on Heard Island are species of Dicranoweisia, while other common mosses include Polytrichastrum alpinum, Racomitrium crispulum, Ditrichum immersum, and Pedinophyllopsis abdita. Salt-tolerant plants, particularly the moss Muelleriella crassifolia, are prevalent in coastal areas exposed to sea spray, and many of the rocks on Heard Island are covered in lichens. As of 2008, 90 lichen species had been identified on Heard Island, nine of which had not previously been recorded elsewhere.

=== Fauna ===
==== Birds ====
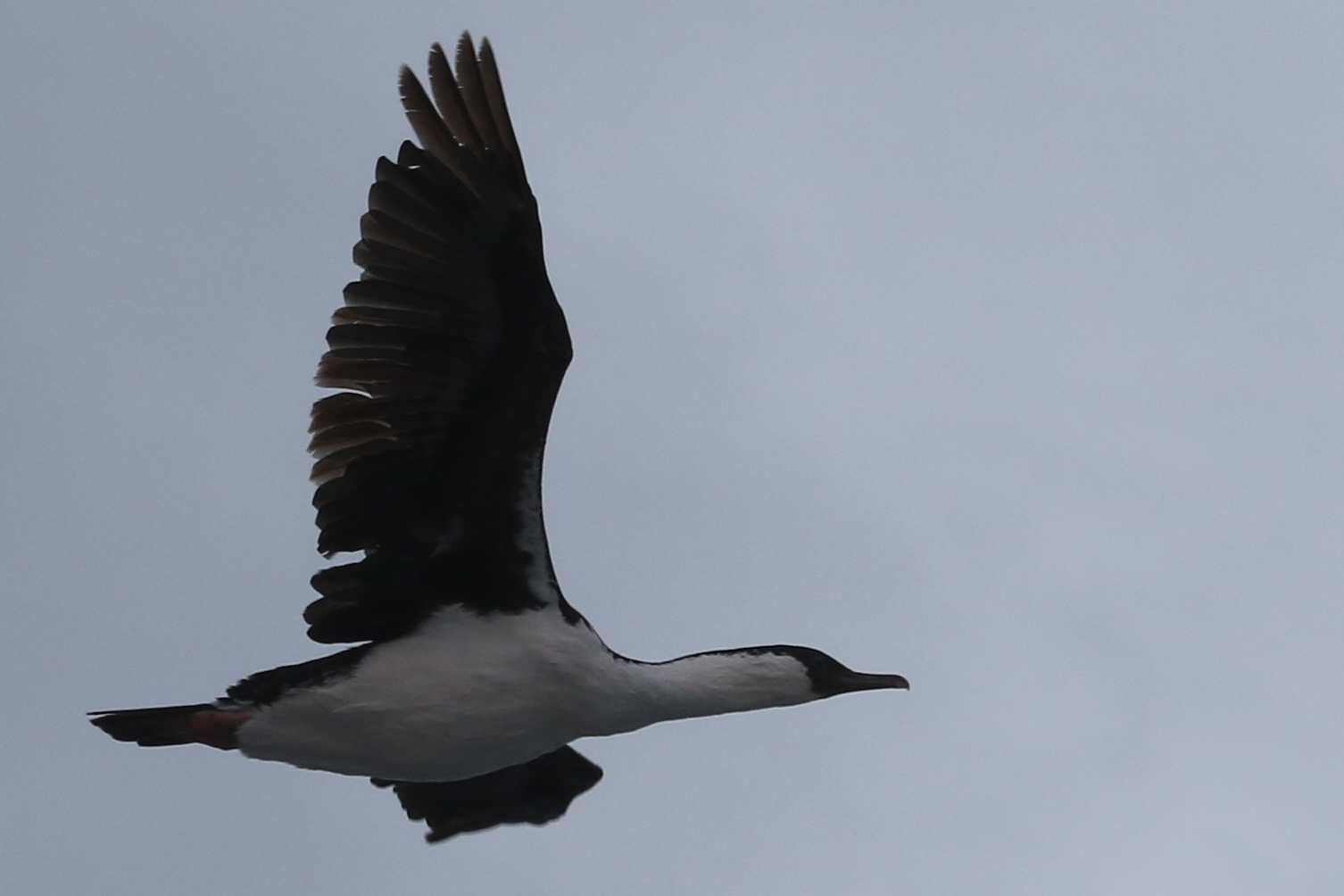
The Heard Island cormorant is unique to Heard Island.

Fifteen flying seabird species are known to breed on Heard Island and at least fifteen others have been recorded visiting the island. The species that breed on Heard Island include three species of albatross and seven species of petrel. The territory is visited by four endangered seabird species (the northern royal albatross, the Amsterdam albatross, the Tristan albatross and the grey-headed albatross), and eight vulnerable species (the southern royal albatross, the sooty albatross, the Indian yellow-nosed albatross, the Campbell albatross, the white-capped albatross, the northern giant petrel, the blue petrel, and the soft-plumaged petrel). The most abundant flying birds are petrels, while several species of albatross, including the wandering albatross, have a presence on the island. There are two types of seabird found only on the island: the Heard Island cormorant and the Heard Island sheathbill, a subspecies of black-faced sheathbill. The population of Heard Island cormorants has been estimated at around 1000 pairs.

Four species of penguin breed on Heard Island: the macaroni penguin, gentoo penguin, king penguin, and eastern rockhopper penguin. Four other penguin species have been recorded visiting the islands. There have been reports of possible emperor penguin sightings on Heard Island, although none have been confirmed. The population of king penguins has risen exponentially from a small number of breeding pairs in 1947 to more than 100,000 pairs in 2004. Heard Island and the McDonald Islands contain about 21 percent of the world's macaroni penguins with around 1 million breeding pairs. A 1992 study estimated that the islands contained about 16,600 pairs of gentoo penguins, or around 6 percent of the world's total, and at least 1000 pairs of rockhopper penguins.

The four species of breeding penguin on Heard Island
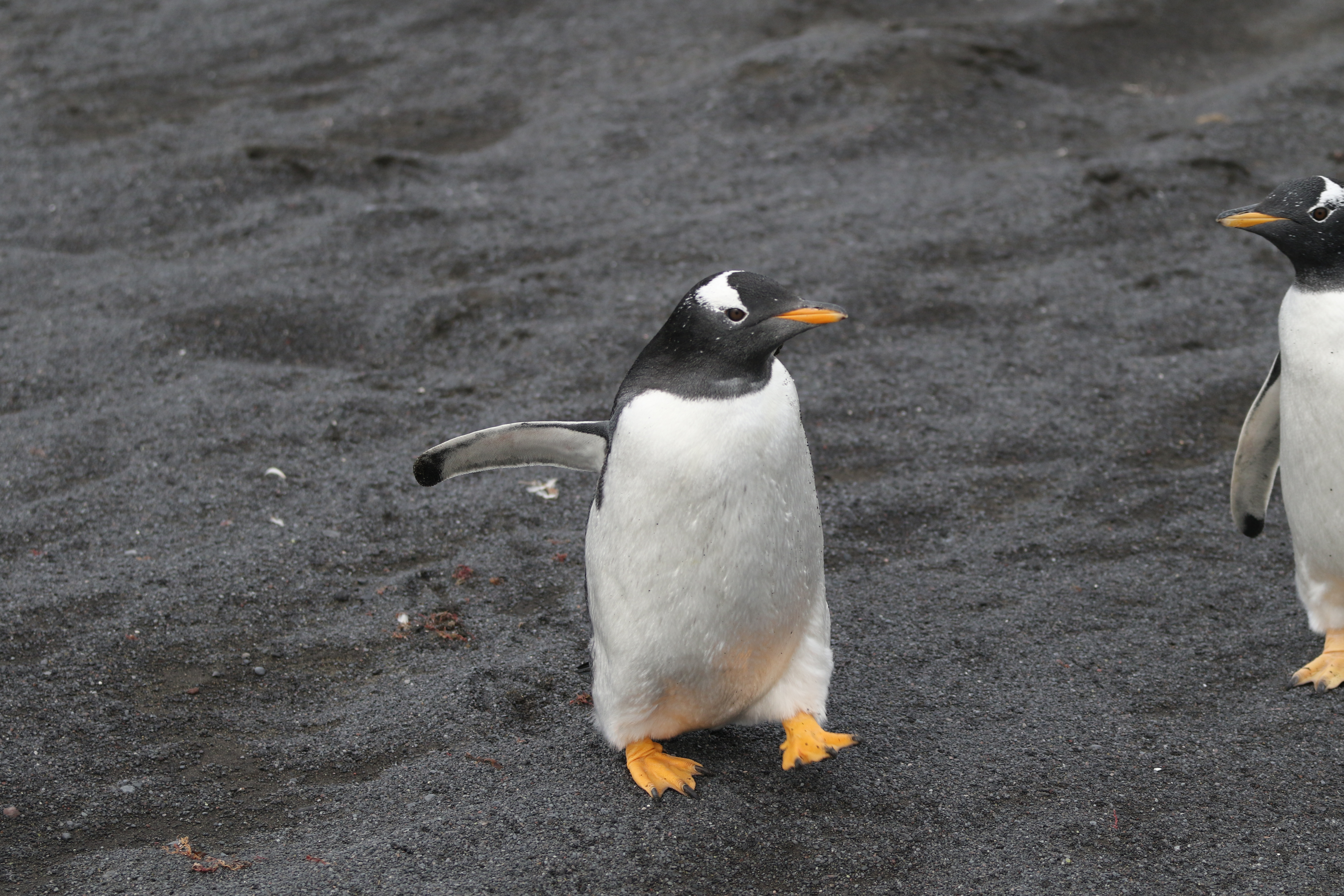
Gentoo penguin

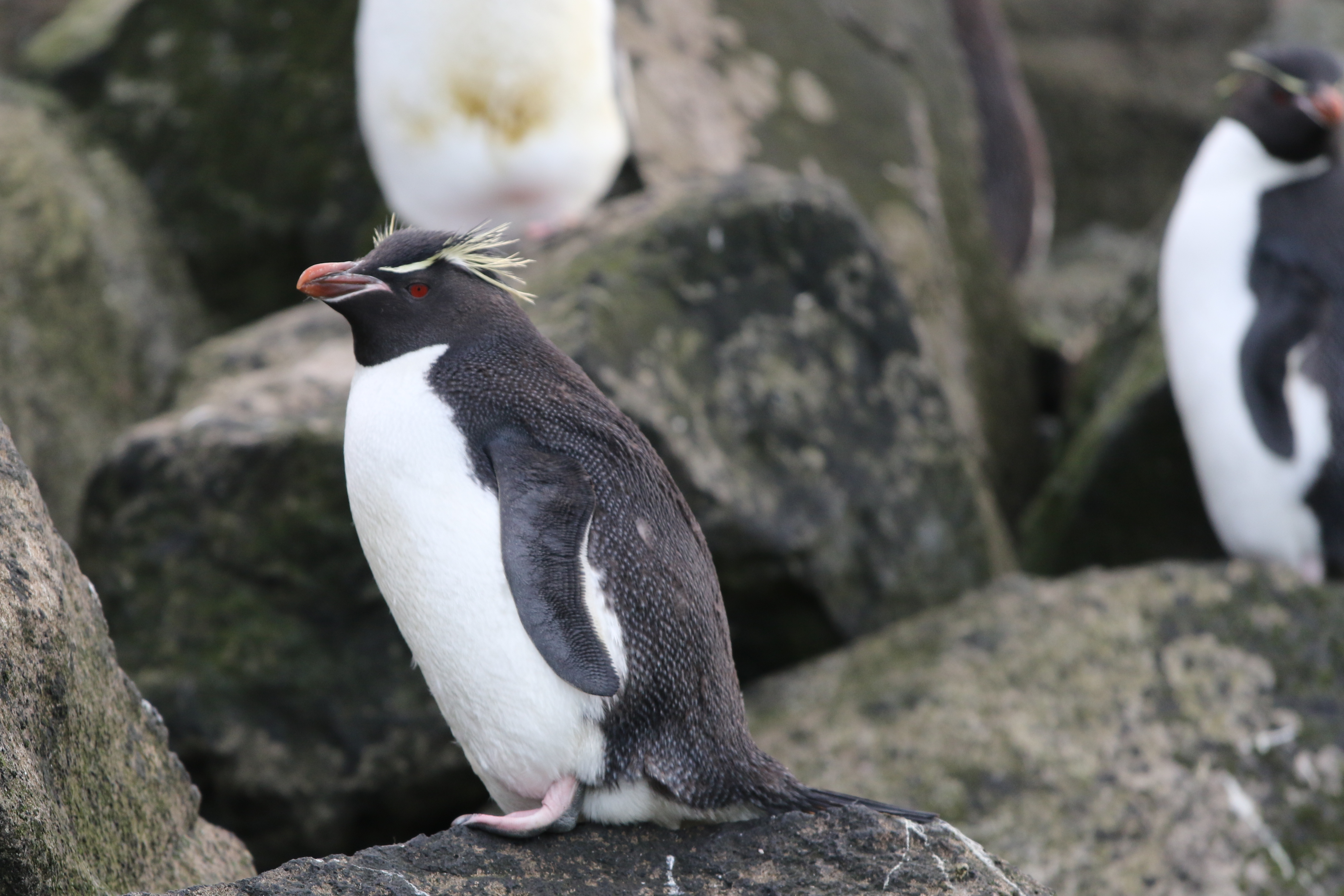
Eastern rockhopper penguin

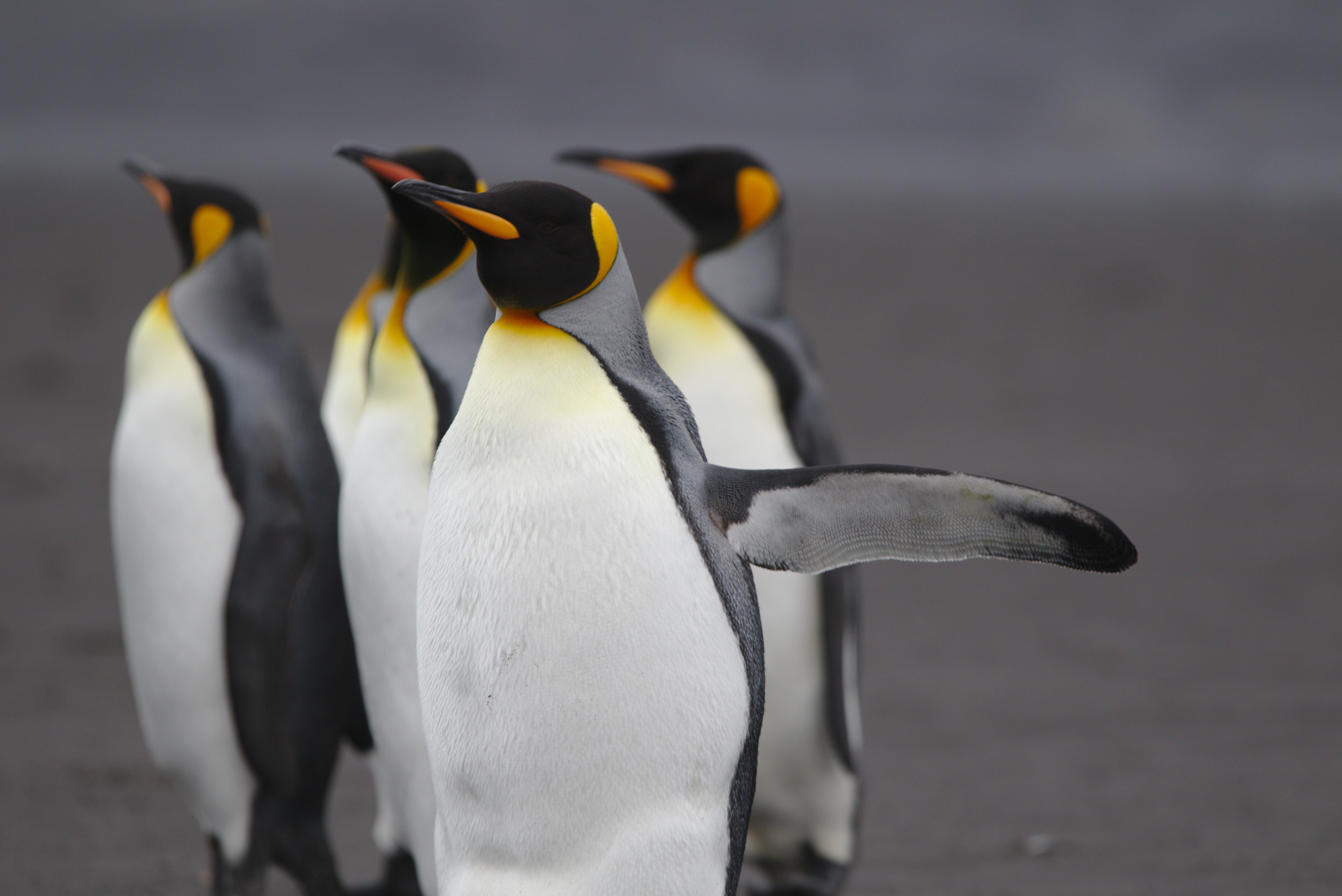
King penguin

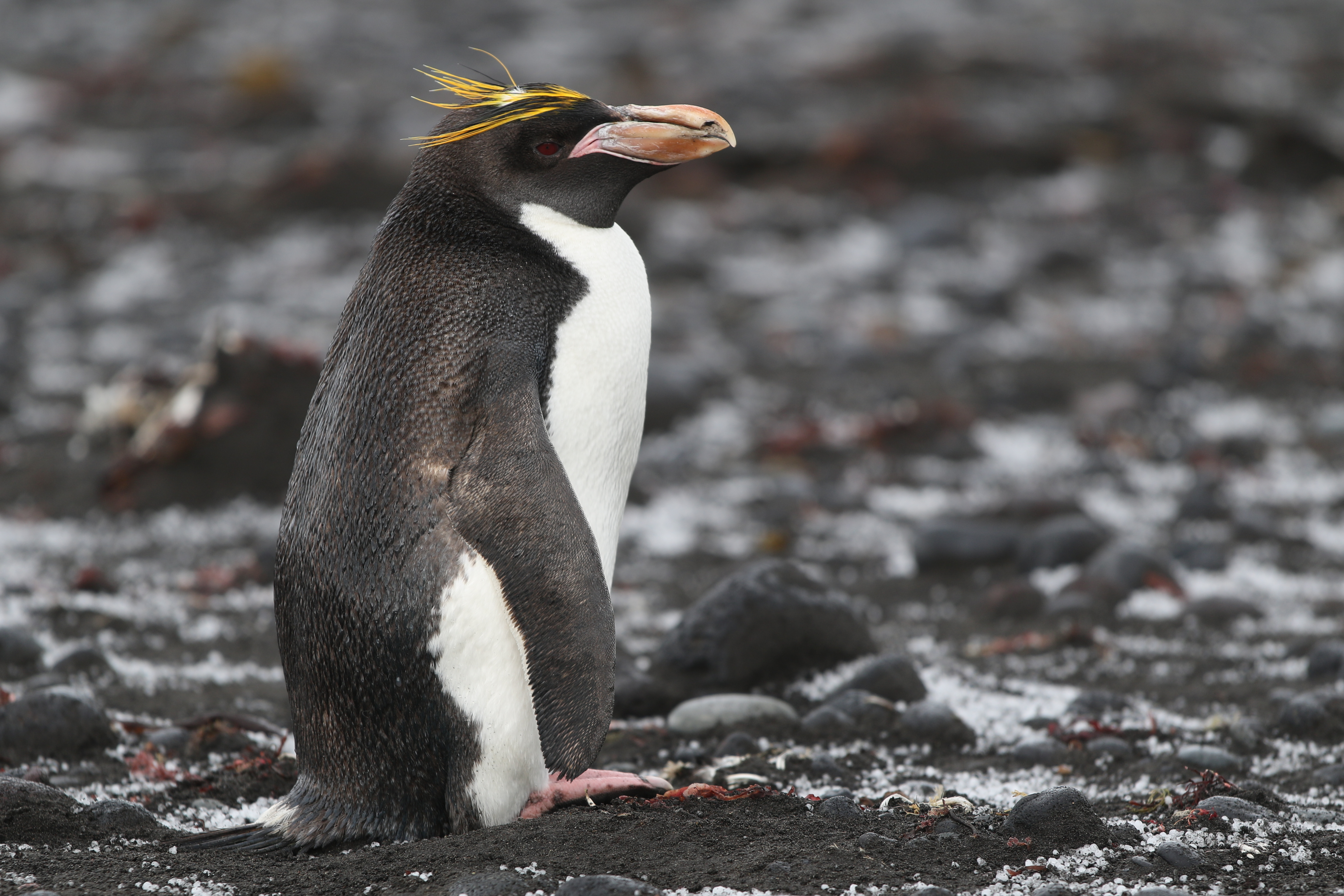
Macaroni penguin

==== Mammals ====
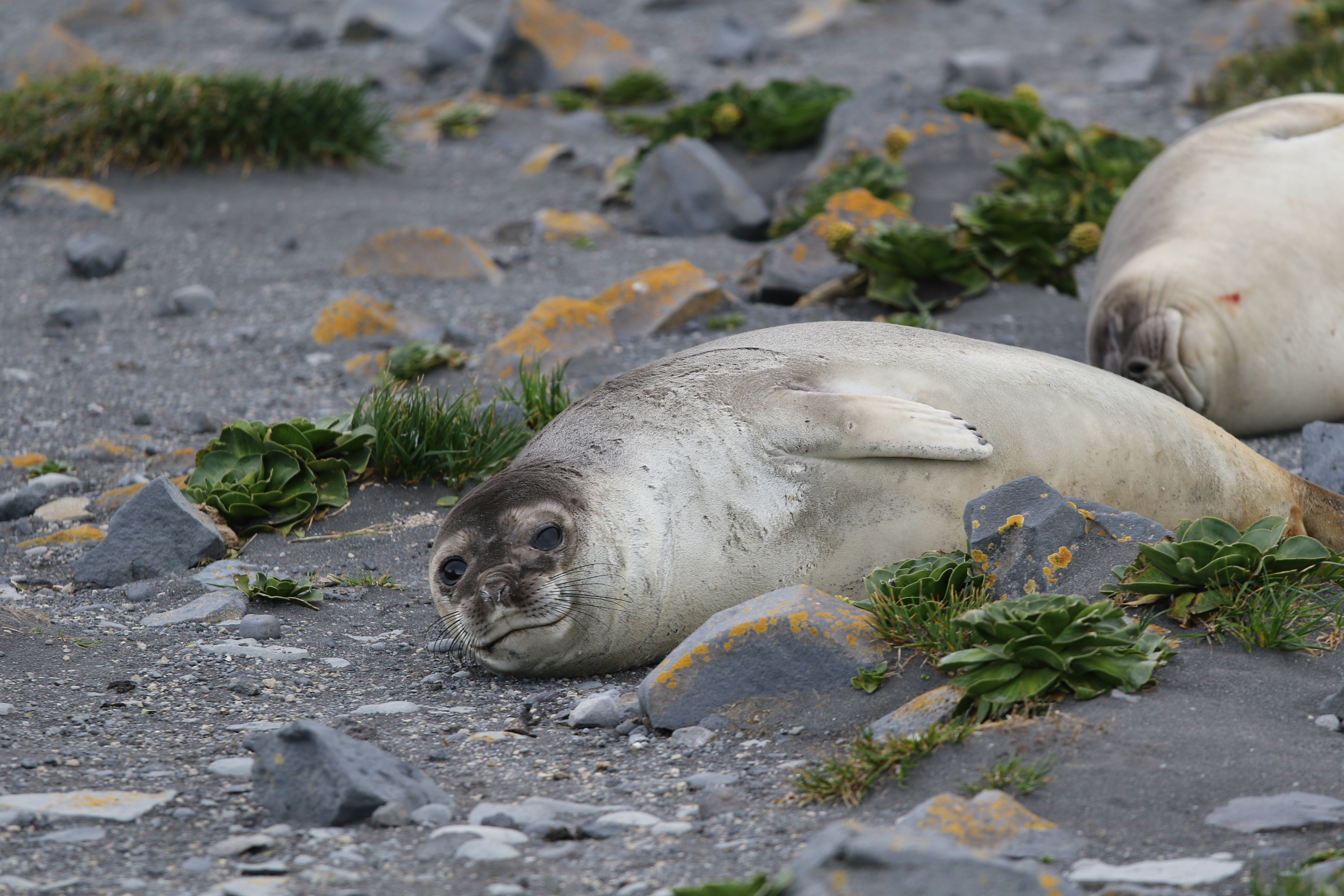
Elephant seals on Heard Island

There are 26 species of marine mammals in the Heard Island and McDonald Islands region. These include 17 species of cetacean, the most common of which are fin whales, Antarctic minke whales, hourglass dolphins, and long-finned pilot whales. Three species of seal breed on Heard Island: the southern elephant seal and the Antarctic fur seal breed in significant numbers, while the sub-Antarctic fur seal has occasionally been seen breeding on the island. Four other species of seal—leopard seals, Weddell seals, crabeater seals, and Ross seals—have been recorded visiting the island.

Southern elephant seals are the most common mammal species on Heard Island. A 1999 study estimated that the population declined by 50 percent between 1949 and 1985, possibly due to a decline in sea ice, but that it had since stabilised. The population of southern elephant seals was estimated at around 14,000 in 1992, which was equivalent to about 30 percent of the total population in the Indian Ocean region. Fur seals were likely nearly or completely eradicated from the island by sealers in the 19th century, but recovered to a total population of about 4500 seals by the 1980s. A population survey in 2000–2001 found that the Antarctic fur seal population reached a peak nearly 30,000 around the end of February, including a large number of visiting male seals, and that the population was increasing at an annual rate of about 10 percent. The same survey recorded a small handful of sub-Antarctic fur seals, one of which had given birth on the island. Another survey conducted three years later found that the population of Antarctic fur seals on the island numbered in the thousands and was growing at an annual rate of 12–20 percent.

During the summer of 2025–26 influenza A virus subtype H5N1 was found in elephant seals on Heard Island. This is believed to be the cause of greater than 75% mortality of infant elephant seals, with the deaths of over 13,000 pups. The bird flu virus was believed to have reached the island in August 2025 and with elevated mortality in king and gentoo penguins. The investigation at Heard Island involved drones and influenza testing but it did not involve necropsies to determine cause of death.

==== Fish ====
Ninety species of fish from thirty-eight families have been recorded in the EEZ surrounding Heard Island and McDonald Islands. Notothenoid fishes, including those in the families Nototheniidae, Channichthyidae, Bathydraconidae, and Harpagiferidae, make up the largest number of these species. The region's shallow waters and banks are home to large populations of notothenoid fishes, while its deeper waters contain a greater abundance of grenadiers and lanternfishes, including Krefftichthys anderssoni and Electrona antarctica. The region is home to at least seven species of chondrichthyans (a class that includes sharks, rays, and skates); its largest fish is the southern sleeper shark. A 1983 study identified nine fish species in the waters nearest to the shores of Heard Island and the McDonald Islands, with the coastal fish population dominated by Notothenia coriiceps coriiceps and Channichthys rhinoceratus.

The Patagonian toothfish is prevalent in the waters surrounding Heard Island and McDonald Islands and is the primary species targeted by commercial fishers, with five fishing vessels harvesting a collective maximum quota of 3000 tons in the 2021–2022 season. The toothfish population surrounding Heard Island and McDonald Islands is genetically distinct from the populations in the vicinity of Macquarie Island and South Georgia and does not typically migrate far from the islands, although toothfish tagged in the Australian EEZ have occasionally been recaptured in the nearby French EEZ surrounding the Kerguelen Islands. The region's shallow waters with depths of less than 500 metres (1600 ft) are home to a greater number of smaller juvenile toothfish, while its deeper waters contain higher densities of older and larger fish. The population of toothfish in the Heard Island and McDonald Islands EEZ is declining; spawning stock biomass was estimated at 45 percent of pre-exploitation levels in 2023, below a management target of 50 percent.

==== Invertebrates ====
There are at least 127 known species of invertebrates on Heard Island, including 33 species of insects. The island is home to very few flying insects. The islands support three acalypterate flightless fly species—Anatalanta aptera, Calycopteryx moseleyi, and Amalopteryx maritima—as well as at least one species of midge from the genus Telmatogeton. Due to the harsh climate, the insect population declines by more than 95 percent from its summer peak each winter. One species of spider, Myro kerguelensis, is found on Heard Island. The islands are also home to at least 10 species of springtails, one species of thrips, 19 species of lice, and 52 species of mites. The invertebrates found in bodies of fresh water on Heard Island include at least 26 species of rotifer, 2 species of gastrotrich, 2 species of tardigrade, and 1 species each of annelid and flatworm. Three of the invertebrate species found on Heard Island are not native: the worm Dendrodrilus rubidus, the thrips Apterothrips apteris, and the mite Tyrophagus putrescentiae.
