= Spitz (disambiguation) =

Spitz is a type of domestic dog.

Spitz may also refer to:

== Places ==
- Spitz, Austria, a market town
- Spitz (Liechtenstein), a mountain
- Spitz Ridge, Marie Byrd Land, Antarctica

== Arts and entertainment ==
- Spitz (band), a Japanese rock band
  - Spitz (album), 1991
- The Spitz, a former music venue in London, England
- Spitz Prize, an award for books on liberal and/or democratic theory
- Spitz (Ninjago), character from Ninjago
- Spitz, a character in the video game series Wario

== Other uses ==
- Spitz (surname), including a list of people with the name
- Spitz (protein), a protein in fruit flies
- SL-C3000 (Spitz), a model of the Sharp Zaurus personal digital assistant
- Spitz Stadium, Alberta, Canada, used primarily for baseball
- Vancil Spitz S1, an American homebuilt aircraft
- Spitz Seeds, a brand owned by PepsiCo

== See also ==
- Spitz nevus, a skin lesion
- Spitzer (bullet)
