= Sokhumi Institute of Physics and Technology =

Georgian research institute

Ilia Vekua Sokhumi Institute of Physics and Technology
- Established: 1945; 81 years ago
- President: Guram Bokuchava
- Head: Giorgi Darsavelidze
- Budget: 1 Million Lari
- Address: Tbilisi, Mindeli St. 7
- Location: Tbilisi, Georgia
- Coordinates: 41.7252199°N 44.709509°E
- Interactive map of Ilia Vekua Sokhumi Institute of Physics and Technology
- Website: www.sipt.org.ge

The Ilia Vekua Sokhumi Institute of Physics and Technology (SIPT) is a research institution in Tbilisi, Georgia, that studies various scientific and technological fields (Nuclear physics, quantum radiophysics, cryogenic technology, nanotechnologies, etc.). Its competence also includes monitoring environmental problems related to radioactive contamination. Today the institute is located in Tbilisi. Its director is Doctor of Physics Guram Bokuchava, and the Scientific Council is headed by Doctor of Physics and Mathematics Giorgi Darsavelidze. It is named after Georgian mathematician Ilia Vekua.

== History ==
=== History of Establishment ===
In the first half of the 20th century, Nazi Germany was distinguished by scientific achievements, where thousands of researchers worked to develop new military technology. One of the projects included the studies of nuclear reactions and the development of the weapons of mass destruction. In 1945, after the Capitulation of Germany, various states got their hands on German science. The USSR was able to bring in hundreds of physicists, including Baron Manfred von Ardenne and Gustav Hertz. By the order of Joseph Stalin and Lavrentiy Beria, they were relocated In Sokhumi with other German scientists and their scientific research institutes were organized in sanatoriums. In particular, Ardenne's laboratory was organized in Sinopi Sanatorium and was named "A", while Hertz's laboratory was located in Agudzera Sanatorium and was named "Г".

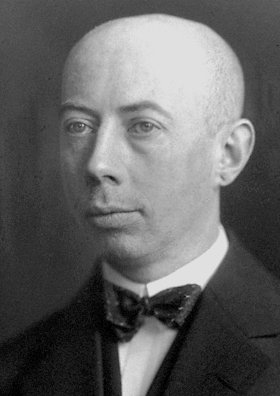
Gustav Ludwig Hertz

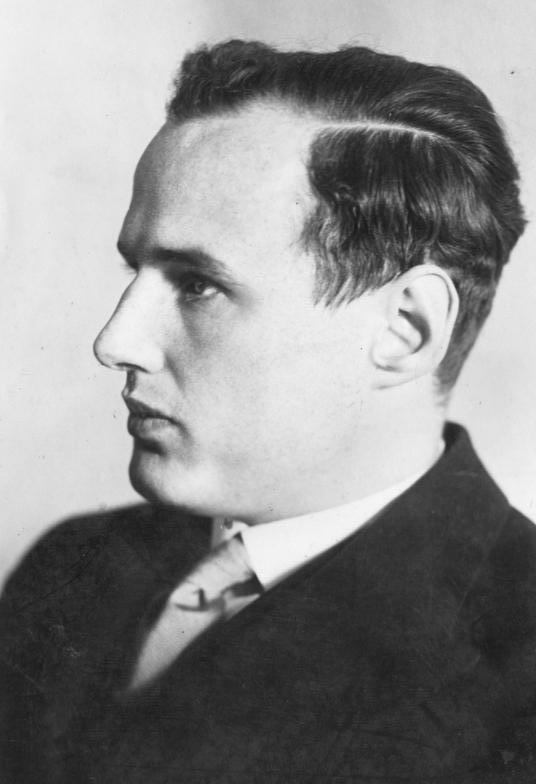
Mandfred Ardene

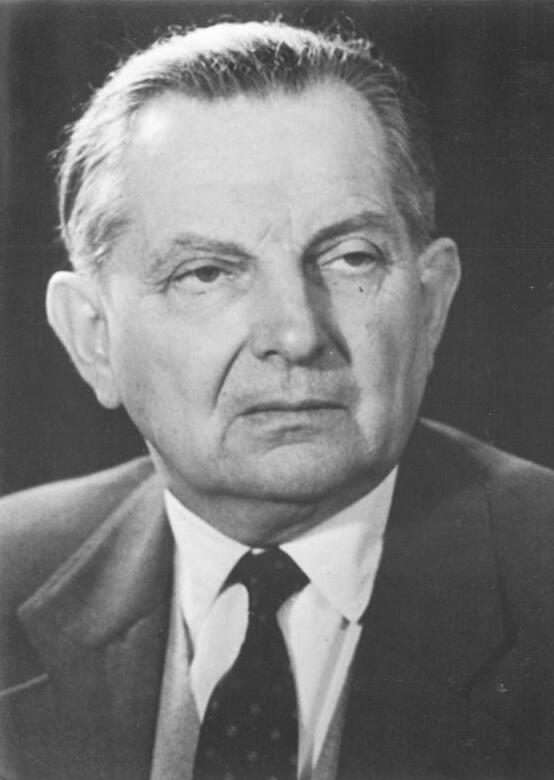
Peter Thiessen

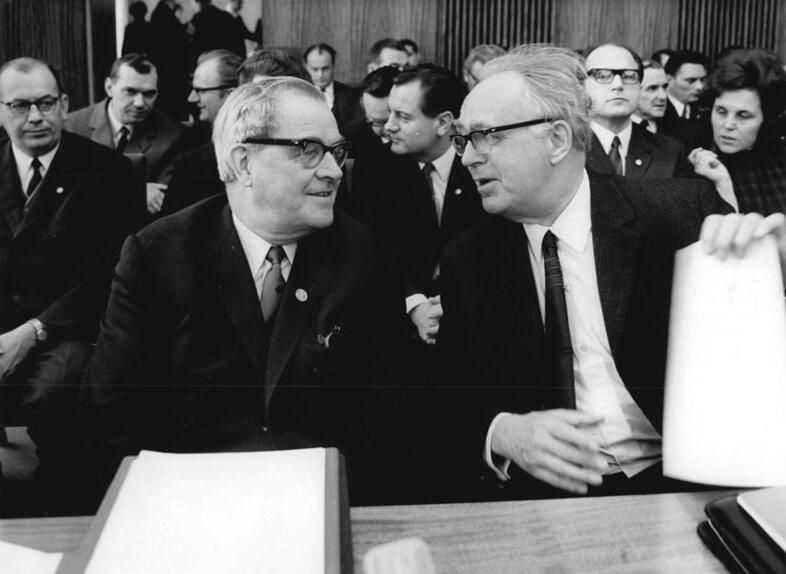
Max Christian Theodore Steinbeck (on the right)

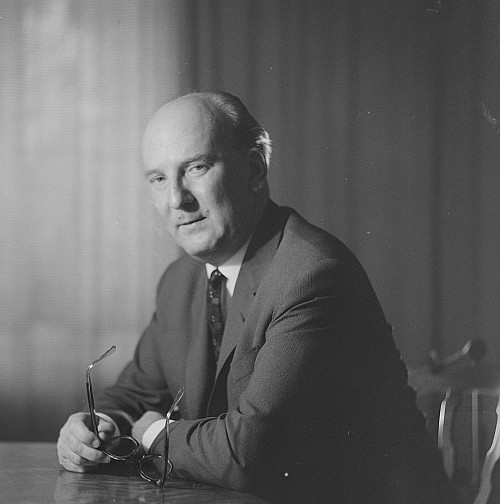
Werner Harman

The main tasks of the "A" Center were:

- The Development of electromagnetic method for separation of uranium isotopes and mass spectrum of heavy metals;
- Refinement of electron microscopes;
- Creating appropriate equipment for nuclear research;
- Creation of diffuse method of isotope division, etc.

The tasks of the "G" Center were:

- To Develop a method for uranium isotopes separation;
- To Develop a method for creating "heavy water";
- To Develop a method for determining neutron energy, etc.

Both establishments were top-secret. The work to obtain a Soviet Atomic Bomb was carried out successfully in both places. Therefore, the scientists were awarded the Stalin Prizes. At the beginning, only German researchers worked there, but in the following years, citizens of the USSR were also employed. After that, the two facilities merged and the organization was renamed "Postal Box 0908", which was run by General Alexander Kochlavashvili, a member of the Council of Ministers from Sinop.

In 1947, Manfred von Arden was awarded the First Degree Stalin Prize. Under his leadership, a masking electron microscope with permanent magnetic lenses and a transparent screen with a resolution of 30 nm was developed.

In 1951, Professor Peter Adolf Thiessen was awarded the First Degree Stalin Prize. Under his leadership, facility produced flat separation filters for the diffusion method of Isotope separation; The diffusion constant numbers of Uranium fluoride (UF _{6}) were calculated. In 1948, Thiessen technology was introduced at the 12th plant near Moscow.

Under the leadership of Max Christian Theodor Steenbeck, a method for the separation of Uranium Isotopes by gas centrifugation was developed. This method of Steenbeck helped to open the Ural Electrochemical Plant in 1946, which was the first centrifugal enrichment plant in the world.

Steenbeck told:

"My work on the centrifuge ended in Leningrad. I shared our experience with Sukhumi employees, a group of industry experts, mathematicians and designers who implemented their own ideas of technical application and made the achievement possible."

A group of scientists led by Gustav Hertz (H. Barvich, I.N. Krutkov, etc.) worked on the creation of a Uranium diffusion enrichment plant. The results of the study were used at the Ural Electrochemical Plant. In 1949, scientists were awarded the Second Degree Stalin Prize for "Theoretical Studies on the Sustainability of the Gas Diffusion Process in the Cascade of Diffusion Machines".

In 1949, the "A" and "Г" centers were transformed into a scientific research institute - "Ski-5", and in 1950 it received its current name, the Sokhumi Institute of Physics and Technology. German physicists began to withdraw from secret activities in 1949, eventually returning to their homeland in 1955-1958.

== SIPT in 1956-1993 ==
After completing large-scale nuclear research at the institute, studies in various fields of physics began, including:

- Plasma physics;
- Solid body physics;
- Thermoelectricity;
- Thermoemission;
- Scientific Tool construction, etc.

== SIPT technologies in the field of healthcare ==
SIPT has developed a "rhythm" (radioisotope thermoelectric converter) for powering Cardiostimulators. A group of scientists led by Guram Bokuchava created the first digital portable pulse measuring device in the USSR, approved by the Ministries of Health of the Soviet republics. Together with the Scientific Center of Traumatology and Orthopedics, the representatives of the institute created various implants for the human joint.

== SIPT technologies for processing production ==
According to the project of employees of subtropical agriculture of Georgia, Tsinaridze and Dadiani, the institute set up an "Ozone-1M" device, which contained an ionizing chamber, switches, blower and exhaust fans, a 6-quartz-mercury lamp – "DRT-400" for ozone and drying of tea leaf to 50% -60% humidity. Through this technology, it was possible to obtain higher temperatures on the surface of the tea leaf, which led to an improvement in the quality of the product. Therefore, the plant became interesting for tea specialists, even abroad, but due to the conflict in Abkhazia, it could not be produced on a large scale.

== Environmental works ==
The subdivisions of the institute have been taking care of the environment since the day of its establishment. They monitored the atmosphere, soil, wastewater and water to prevent biochemical and radiation pollution. The use of the Black Sea resources, namely Hydrogen Sulfide, began to be debated in the 1980s. After the Chernobyl disaster, the institute started to study the radiation pollution of Western Georgia, as a result of which a corresponding map was created.

== SIPT 1993- ==
Due to the conflicts in Georgia since 1992, SIPT could no longer operate in Sokhumi, so in December 1993 the center moved to Tbilisi. From 1991 to 2005, the Institute was subordinated to the State Committee for Science and Technology, and in 2006 it received the status of a legal entity under public law. From the same year the institute is headed by Dr. Guram Bokuchava. Under his leadership the Institute became involved in more international projects; The structure of the institution was also developed, in particular, new units were created.

== List of Heads ==
Name	Beginning of a Term	End of a Term
Aleksandre Kochlavashvili	1945	1951
Vladimir Migulini	1951	1954
B. M. Isaevi	1954	1958
Ilia Kvartskhava	1958	1962
Irakli Gverdtsiteli	1962	1969
N. I. Leontiev	1969	1974
Revaz Salukvadze	1974	2000
Walter Kashia	2000	2005
Guram Bokuchava	2006	To this day

== Structural units ==
=== Cryogenic Engineering and Technology Laboratory ===
Scientific directions:

- Cryogenic vacuum equipment and technologies;
- Technologies for making high-temperature superconductors and their research;
- Technologies of nano-structured materials and their research.

=== Chemical Technology Laboratory ===
Scientific directions:

- Technologies for creating nanocompositions and ceramic materials;
- Electrically conductive polymeric materials and nanocomposites;
- Chemical methodology for solving environmental safety problems.

=== Laboratory of non-traditional energy ===
Scientific directions:

- Synthesis and research of thermoelectric SiGe alloys with low (1-10 atm%) germanium content;
- Development and research of thermoelectric batteries and generators based on SiGe alloys.

=== Semiconductor and Radiation Technology Laboratory ===
Scientific directions:

- Radiation physics, technologies and materials science;
- Semiconductor ion implantation microprocessor detector technology for national and nuclear safety;
- Technology of radiation-modified ion implantation composite materials for products with improved properties and functional characteristics.

=== Semiconductor Materials Science Laboratory ===
Scientific directions:

- Technology of volumetric crystals of semiconductor materials, polished bases and p-n structures;
- Semiconductor material science.

=== Department of Modeling and System Equipment of Radiophysical and Electronic Systems ===
Scientific directions:

- Modeling and system engineering of radiophysical and electronic systems;
- Radio frequency and radiation technologies;
- Laser and optical information technologies;
- Expert works.

== Bibliography ==
- Андрюшин, И., Чернышев, А., & Юдин, Ю. (2003). Укрощение Ядра. Саранск: Красный Октябрь.
