= Elephant Spit =

Promontory on Heard Island

Coordinates: 53°5′S 73°48′E

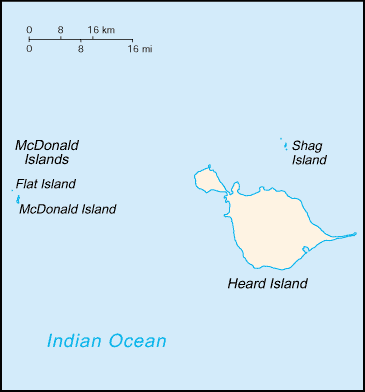
Map of Heard Island showing Elephant Spit at its eastern (right-hand) end

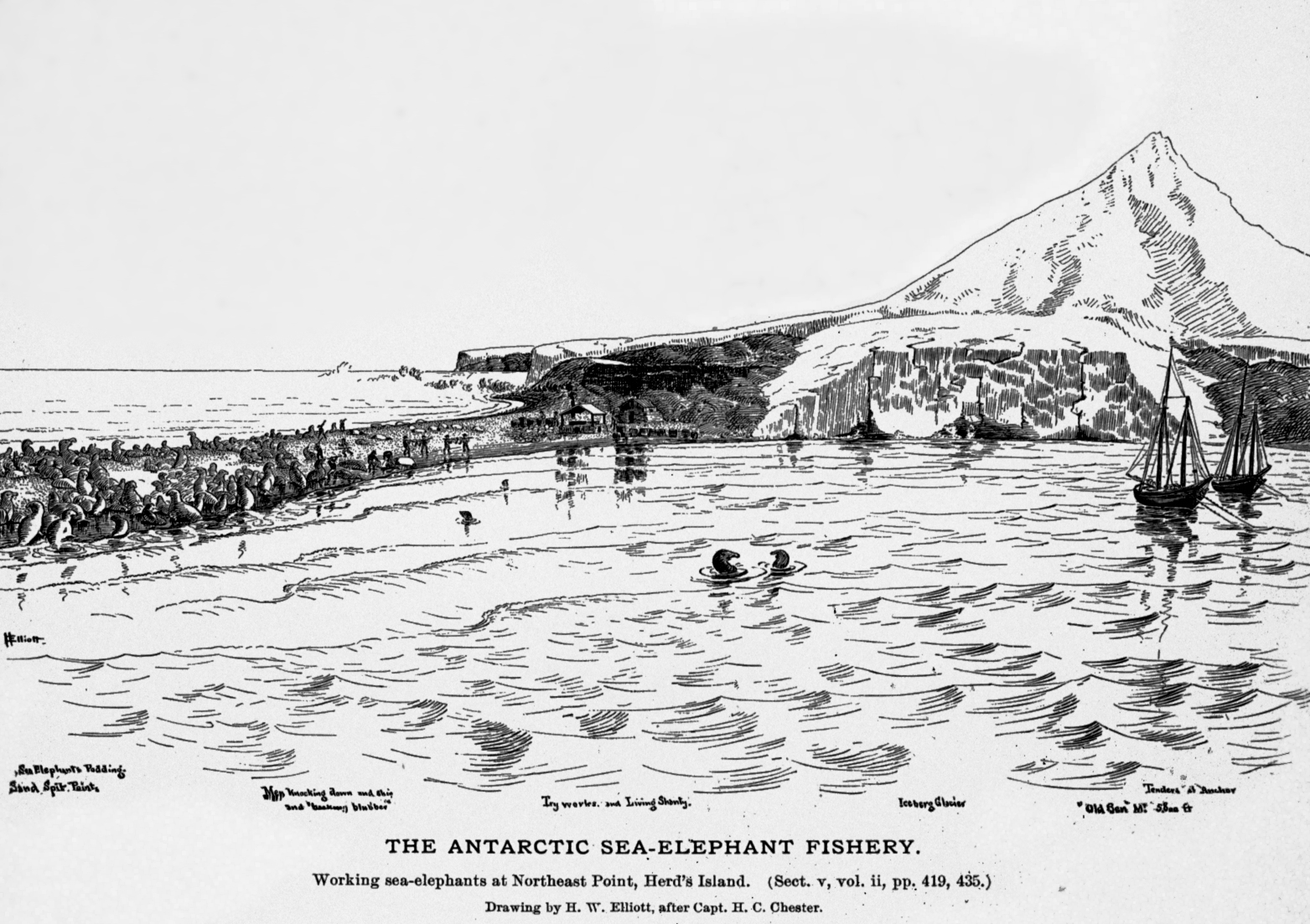
Slaughtering and processing elephant seals on Sealers Beach at the base of the spit on left - view from north-east - 19th century scene

Elephant Spit is a 9 km long sand spit at the eastern end of subantarctic Heard Island, in the Australian territory of Heard Island and McDonald Islands, lying in the Southern Ocean on the Kerguelen Plateau about 450 km south-east of the Kerguelen Islands. The name refers to southern elephant seals, also known as sea elephants, which breed in large numbers on Heard Island and formed the basis for commercial sealing for oil there during the 19th century.

== Description ==
Elephant Spit is long, thin, straight and conspicuous, giving the island a distinctive shape as seen from space. It borders Spit Bay to the north and west, and is formed of sediments derived from the glacial erosion of volcanic material from eruptions by Big Ben, which have made the seabed south-east of the island relatively shallow.

Heard Island is isolated, uninhabited, and rarely visited. When the island was visited in 2002 and 2003 by scientists from the Australian Antarctic Division, the spit was intact. However, a following visit in late 2008 found that a section of the eastern end of the spit had become inundated by the ocean, forming a 2-km-long island.
