= Images (disambiguation) =

Images are artifacts that depict visual perception, such as photographs or other two-dimensional pictures.

Images may also refer to:

== Music ==
=== Classical ===
- Images (piano suite) (1901–1907), a cycle of six compositions for solo piano by Claude Debussy
- Images pour orchestre (1905–1912), an orchestral composition by Claude Debussy
- Images (Skempton) (1989), a set of piano pieces by Howard Skempton

=== Popular music ===
- Images (band), a French synth-pop band
- Image song, a song related to a fictional work, sung in-character

=== Albums ===
- Images (Sarah Vaughan album), 1954
- Images (Sonny Red album), 1962
- Images (The Walker Brothers album), 1967
- Images (Cilla Black album), 1971
- Images (Dan Hartman album), 1976
- Images (Lucio Battisti album), 1977
- Images (Brotherhood of Man album), 1977
- Images (Ronnie Milsap album), 1979
- Images (Amii Stewart album), 1981
- Images (Ralph Moore album), 1989
- Images (Reggie Workman album), 1990
- Images – The Best of Jean-Michel Jarre, 1991
- Images (Kenny Barron album), 2004
- Images (EP), 1993 extended-play disc by Dive

== Other ==
- The Images (Tasmania), a set of rocky islets off Tasmania
- Images (ballet), a 1992 ballet by Miriam Mahdaviani
- Images (film), a 1972 film directed by Robert Altman
- Images (book), a 1994 book by David Lynch

== See also ==
- Image (disambiguation)
- Imagery
