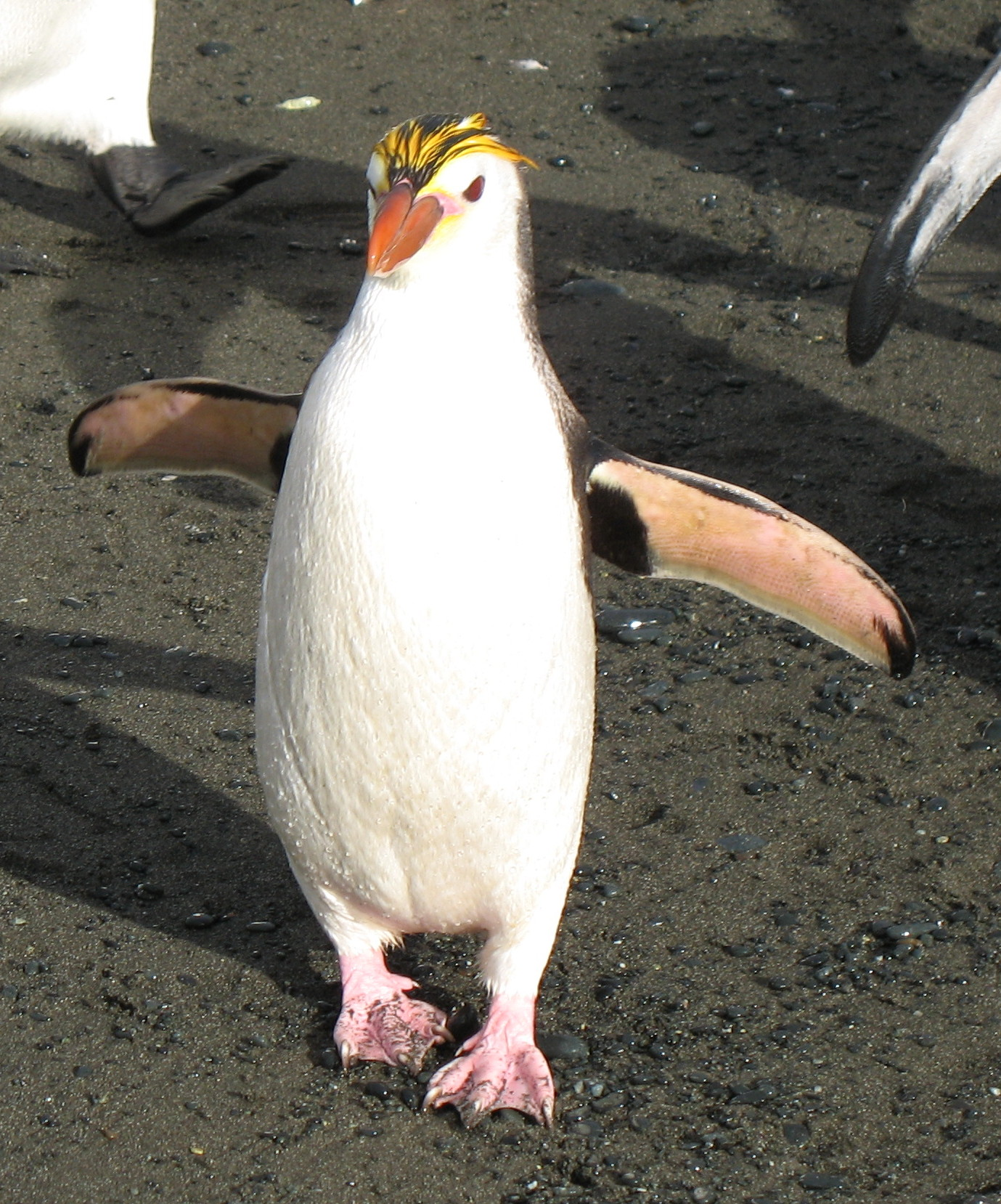

Conservation status
- Least Concern (IUCN 3.1)

Scientific classification
- Kingdom: Animalia
- Phylum: Chordata
- Class: Aves
- Order: Sphenisciformes
- Family: Spheniscidae
- Genus: Eudyptes
- Species: E. schlegeli

Binomial name
- Eudyptes schlegeli Finsch, 1876
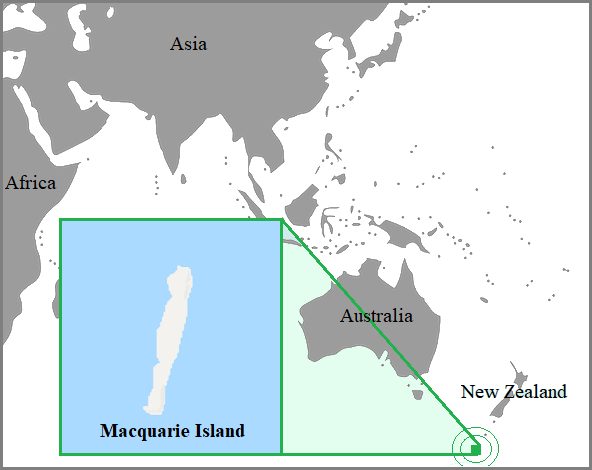
- Distribution royal penguin

Audio
- Calls Calls of Royal Penguins (Eudyptes schlegeli) at Hurd Point

= Royal penguin =

Subspecies of the Macaroni penguin

The royal penguin (Eudyptes schlegeli) is a species of penguin, which can be found only on the sub-Antarctic Macquarie Island and adjacent islands. The International Union for Conservation of Nature (IUCN) classifies the royal penguin as Least Concern.

== Taxonomy ==
The royal penguin belongs to the genus Eudyptes. It was first described by the German ornithologist Otto Finsch in 1876 and was named in honor of the German zoologist Hermann Schlegel.

The species is very closely related to the macaroni penguin (Eudyptes chrysolophus), and the two have sometimes been treated as conspecific due to their similar morphology and behavior. Hybridization between royal and macaroni penguins has also been recorded on Macquarie Island.

== Description ==
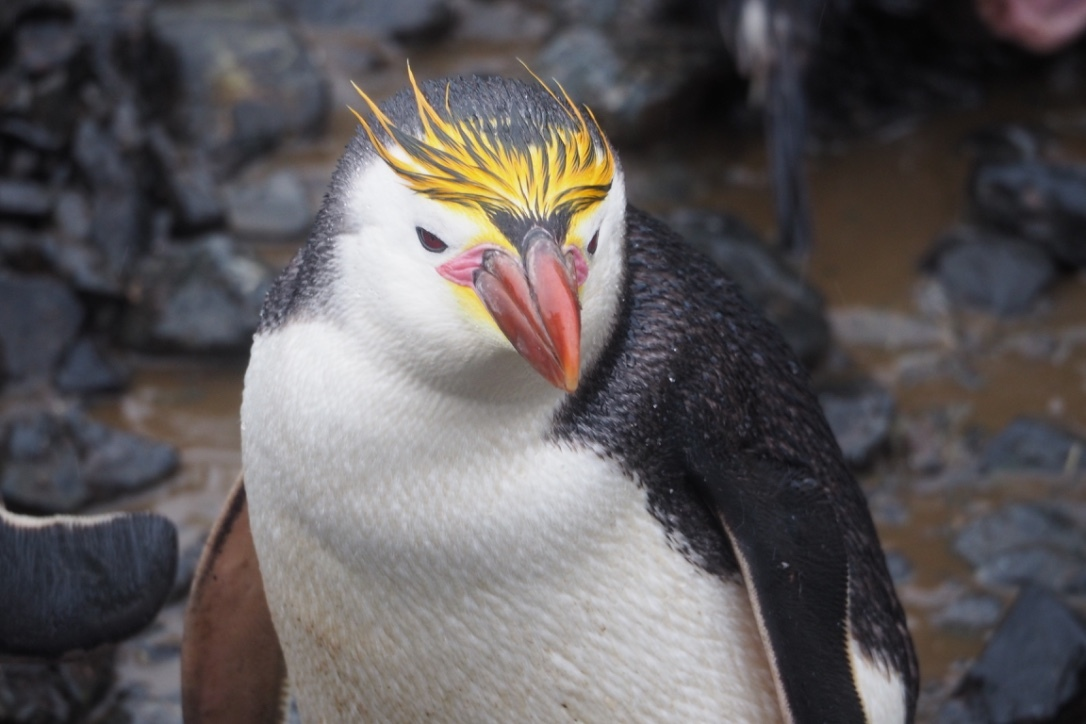
Closeup

The royal penguin closely resembles the macaroni penguin (Eudyptes chrysolophus), from which it differs primarily in having a white or pale grey face and chin rather than black. Adults possess a black head, back, and flippers contrasted with white underparts, and bear long yellow-orange crest feathers extending from the forehead over the eyes. The bill is orange-brown with a dark tip, and the eyes are red-brown.

Adults typically weigh between 11 and 17 lb, though body mass varies considerably throughout the breeding season. Males are generally slightly larger and heavier than females. Juveniles resemble adults but have duller plumage, shorter crests, and darker facial coloration. Chicks are covered in brown down during early development before molting into juvenile plumage prior to fledging.

== Distribution and habitat ==
The royal penguin is endemic to the subantarctic Macquarie Island and the nearby Bishop and Clerk Islets in the Southern Ocean. Breeding colonies occur on beaches, coastal terraces, and vegetated slopes, sometimes extending inland and reaching elevations of over 490 ft above sea level. Colonies are often situated near access routes to the sea such as creeks or natural pathways through dense vegetation.

Outside the breeding and moulting seasons, royal penguins are pelagic and spend most of their lives at sea in subantarctic waters surrounding Antarctica. Their non-breeding distribution remains incompletely known, though individuals are believed to disperse widely throughout the Southern Ocean.

== Behavior ==
=== Courtship and breeding ===
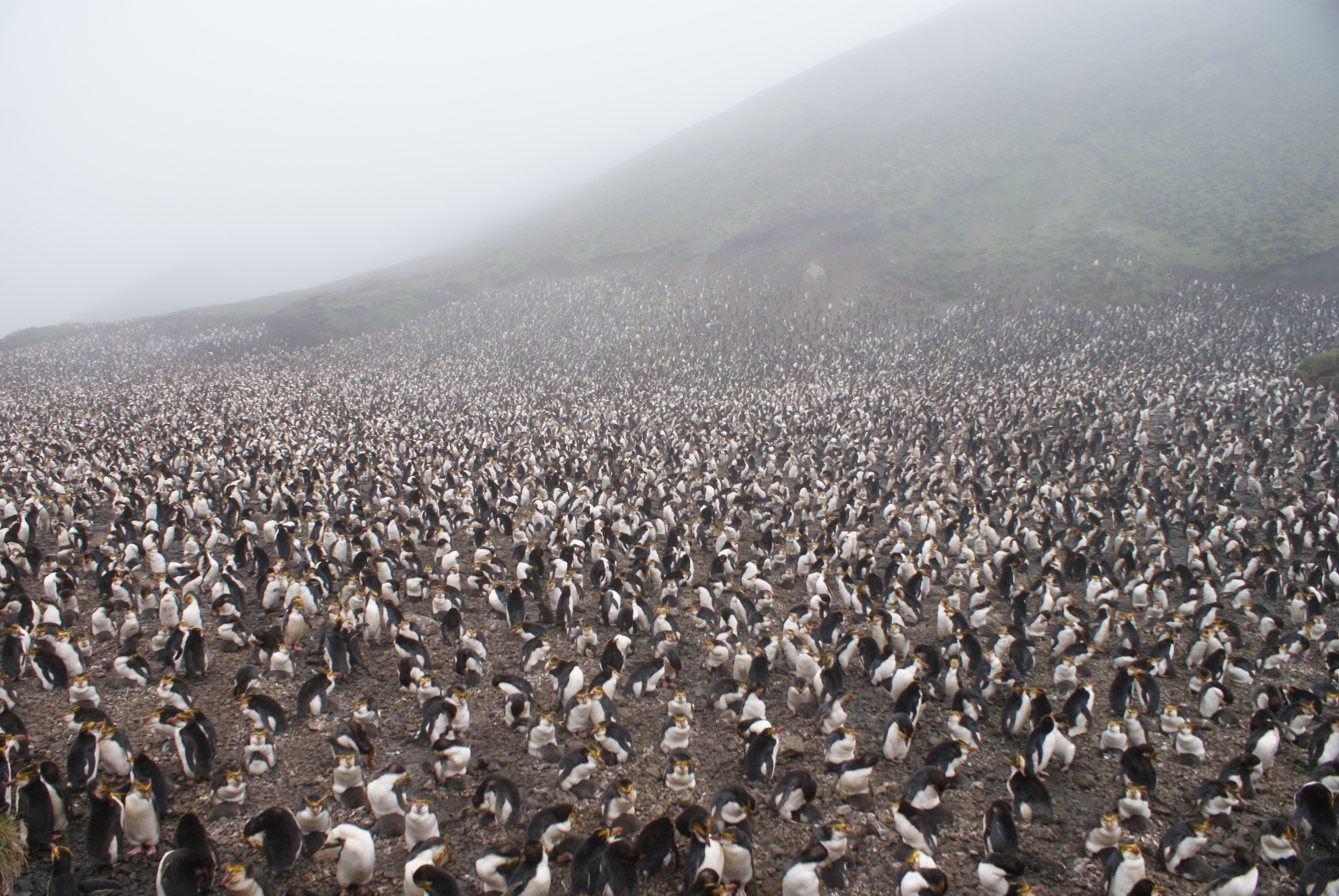
A colony of 60,000 royal penguins on Macquarie Island.

Royal penguins breed colonially on Macquarie Island, nesting on beaches and bare or sparsely vegetated slopes, sometimes up to 1 mile inland. Nesting densities may reach approximately 2.43 nests per square meter. Adults return to colonies from late September to October, with egg-laying occurring synchronously and peaking between 20–23 October. Nests are typically shallow scrapes in sandy or grassy ground, occasionally lined with stones, grass, or pebbles.

Like other members of the genus Eudyptes, royal penguins lay a two-egg clutch consisting of a smaller first-laid A-egg and a substantially larger second-laid B-egg. The first egg is frequently abandoned shortly before or after the second egg is laid, and chicks originating from A-eggs survive far less often than those from B-eggs. Although the exact cause of this behavior remains uncertain, it is characteristic of crested penguins and contributes to the strong survival bias toward the second egg.

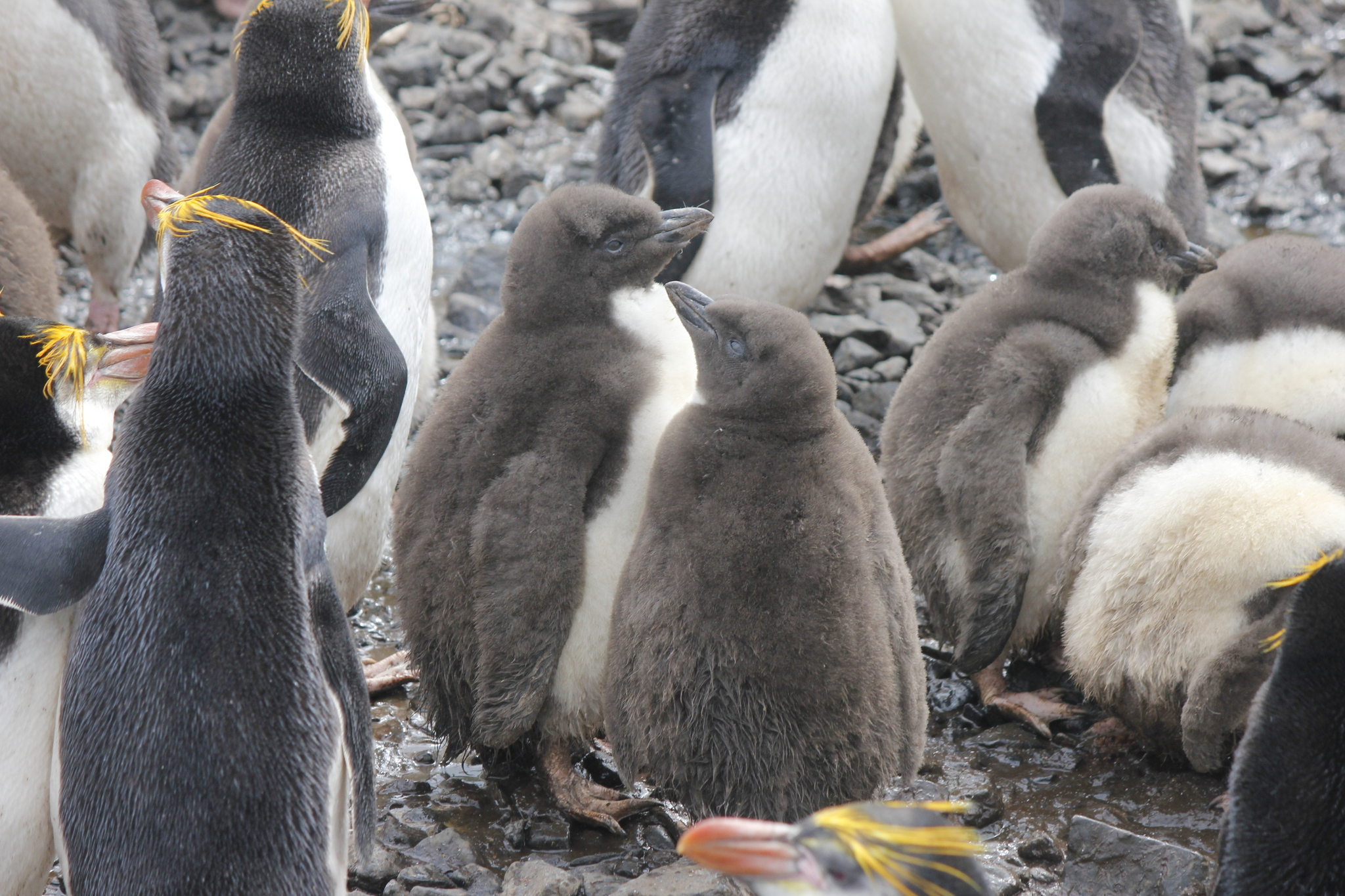
Royal penguin chicks.

Incubation lasts approximately 35 days and is shared by both sexes in alternating shifts of up to 10–14 days. Following hatching, males usually guard the chick for 2–3 weeks while females forage at sea and return with food. If provisioning trips are delayed for extended periods, chick mortality may occur.

After the guard stage, chicks form large crèches in January for warmth and protection while both parents continue feeding them several times daily. Fledging generally occurs at around 65 days of age, with most juveniles departing colonies between February and March after molting into juvenile plumage.

Royal penguins are generally socially monogamous, although mate fidelity between breeding seasons is variable. Courtship and territorial displays include trumpeting vocalizations, head swinging, mutual display postures, and bill-fencing between prospective mates.

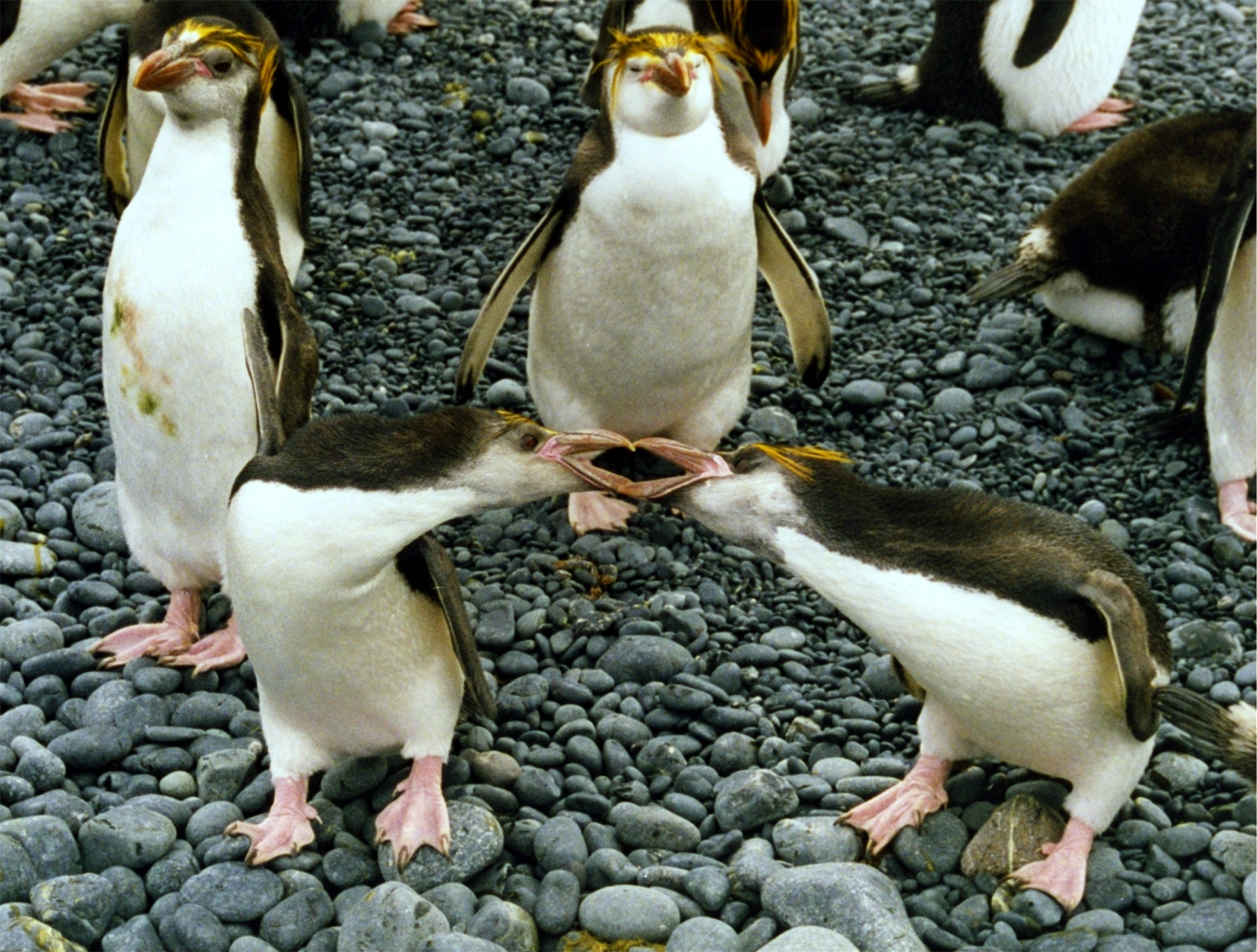
Royal penguins fighting on Macquarie Island

=== Diet and feeding ===
The diet of the royal penguin consists primarily of crustaceans, especially krill such as Euphausia vallentini, E. similis, and Thysanoessa gregaria, as well as amphipods. Fish are also important prey items and include lanternfishes such as Krefftichthys anderssoni, Gymnoscopelus sp., Protomyctophum sp., and Electrona carlsbergi, in addition to barracudinas and notothens. Cephalopods, including Onykia sp., are also consumed.

Diet composition varies seasonally. The krill Euphausia vallentini predominates during incubation and moulting periods, while the diet becomes more diverse during chick-rearing, with increased proportions of fish and cephalopods. Adults forage pelagically in offshore waters, likely capturing prey primarily through pursuit-diving.

During the breeding season, royal penguins from neighboring colonies appear to forage within localized and partially segregated feeding areas, a behavior thought to reduce intercolony competition for prey resources.

=== Predators ===
Predators of the royal penguin include skuas and southern giant petrels, which commonly prey upon eggs and young chicks within breeding colonies. Southern elephant seals may inadvertently crush eggs, chicks, and occasionally adults while moving through densely packed nesting sites. New Zealand fur seals have also been observed attacking royal penguins on occasion.

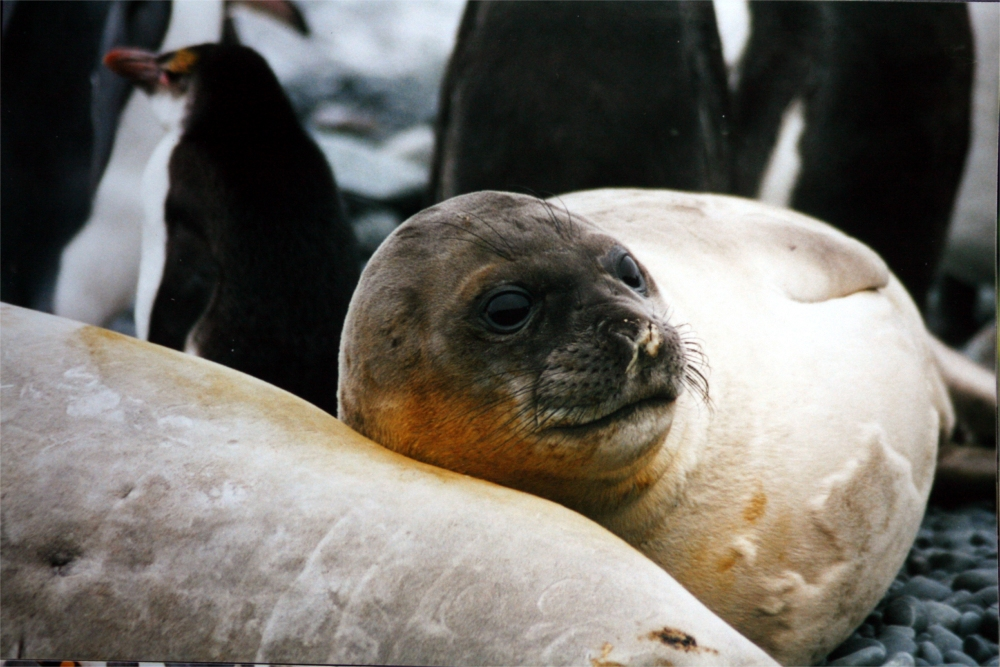
A female southern elephant seal surrounded by royal penguins.

Historically, introduced wekas on Macquarie Island preyed heavily upon eggs and chicks by moving through nesting areas and tussock vegetation, contributing to declines in some colonies before their eradication from the island.

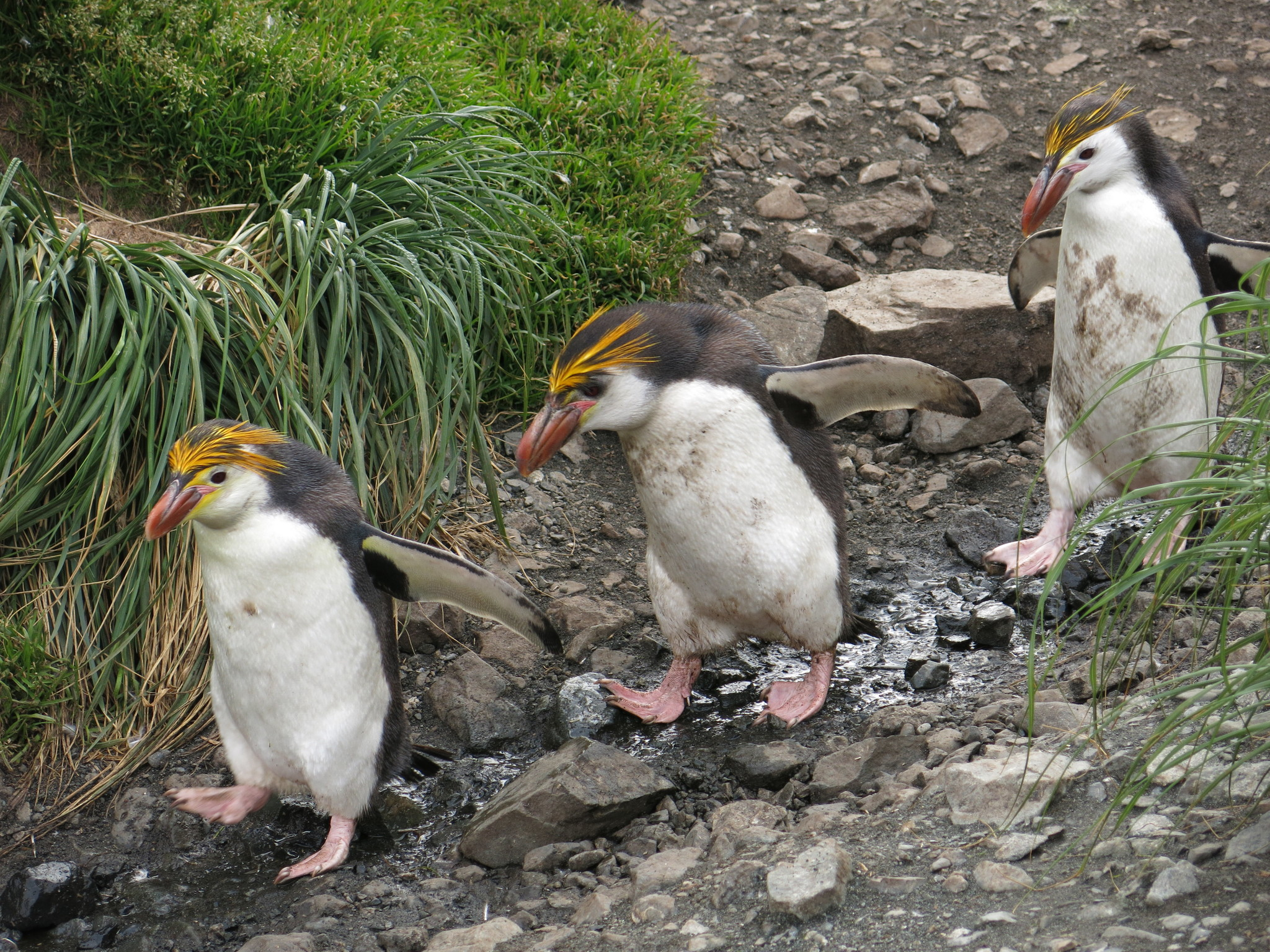
A trio of penguins heading to the sea to forage.

== Threats ==
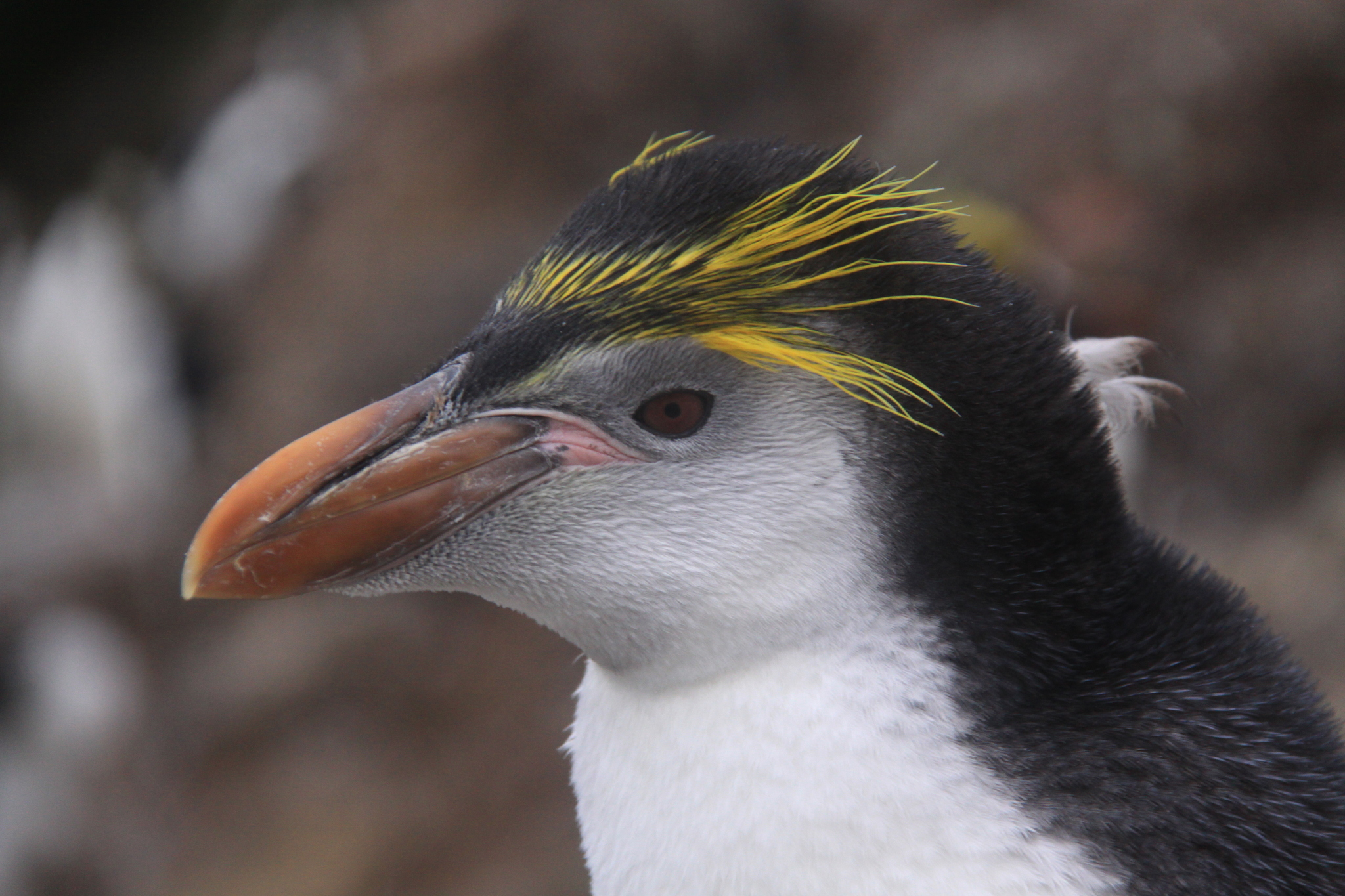
Royal penguin head

Royal penguins as a species are classified as Least Concern by the IUCN, with a high risk of endangerment in the wild. The Royal Penguin is not listed under the Environment Protection and Biodiversity Conservation Act 1999.

Historically, they were hunted for their oil; between 1870 and 1919, the government of Tasmania issued licences for hunting them, with an average of 150,000 penguins (both royal and king) being taken each year. At the peak of the industry in 1905, the plant established on Macquarie Island was processing 2000 penguins at a time, with each penguin yielding about half a litre of oil.

Since the end of penguin hunting on Macquarie, the numbers have climbed to 850,000 pairs. Before hunting started, there were three million penguins on the island (both royal and king).

Modern threats to the royal penguin include introduced predators such as rats (and formerly cats, but they were eradicated from Macquarie Island recently), discarded plastic, pollution, and decreased food supply due to commercial fishing.
