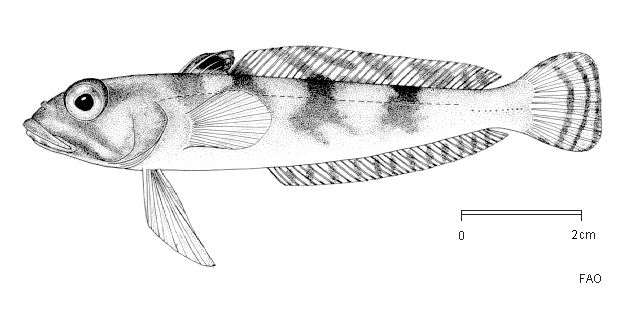
- Illustration
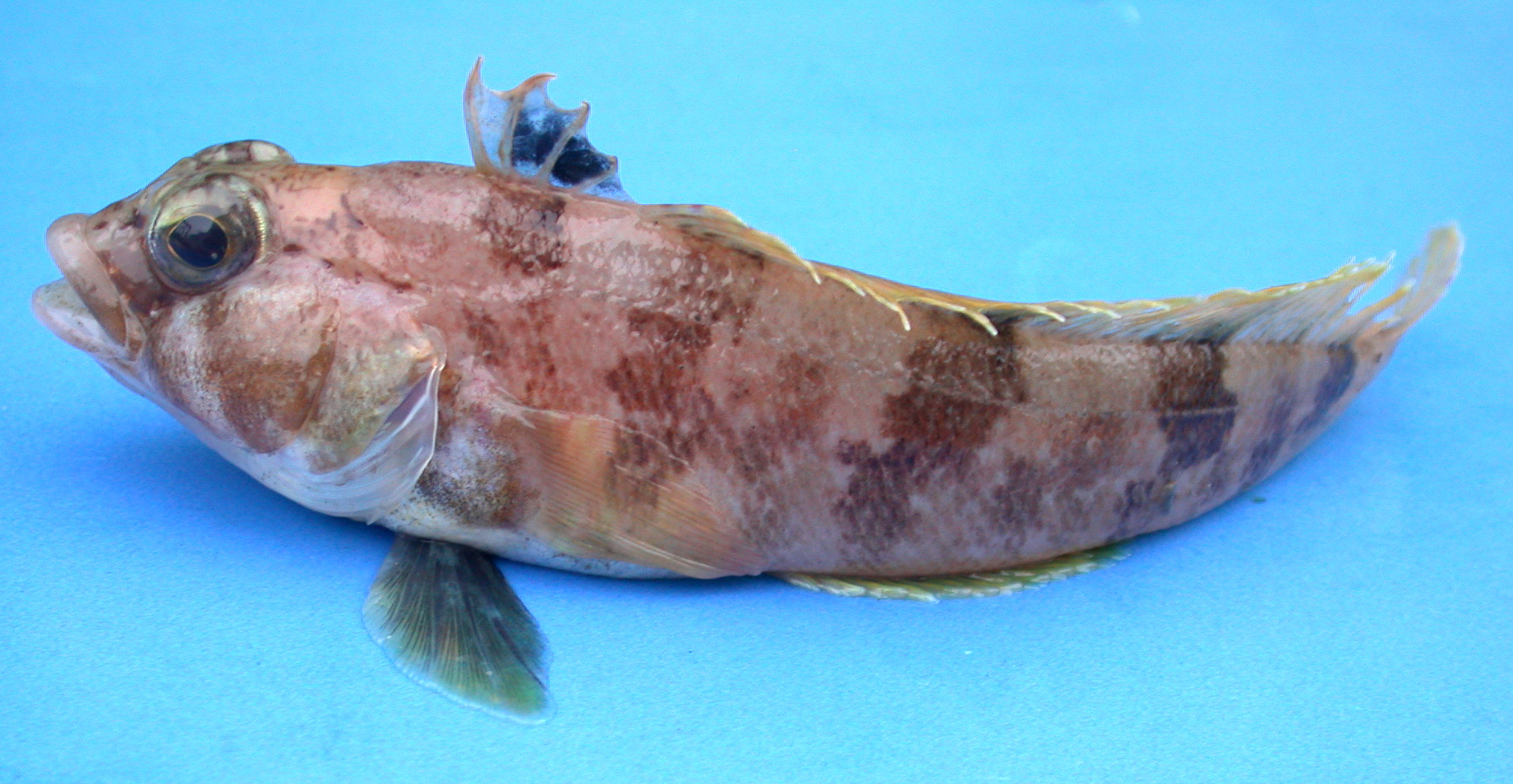
- Specimen from the South Shetland Islands

Scientific classification
- Kingdom: Animalia
- Phylum: Chordata
- Class: Actinopterygii
- Order: Perciformes
- Family: Nototheniidae
- Genus: Lindbergichthys
- Species: L. nudifrons

Binomial name
- Lindbergichthys nudifrons (Lönnberg 1905)

Synonyms
- Notothenia mizops nudifrons Lönnberg, 1905; Lepidonotothen nudifrons (Lönnberg, 1905); Notothenia nudifrons Lönnberg, 1905; Nototheniops nudifrons (Lönnberg, 1905)

= Lindbergichthys nudifrons =

Species of fish

Lindbergichthys nudifrons, the yellowfin rockcod, also known as the yellow notie or the gaudy notothen, is a species of marine ray-finned fish, belonging to the family Nototheniidae, the notothens or cod icefishes. It is native to the Atlantic sector of the Southern Ocean.

== Taxonomy ==
Lindbergichthys nudifrons was first formally described in 1905 as Notothenia mizops nudifrons by the Swedish zoologist Einar Lönnberg with the type locality given as eight locations on South Georgia and 2 Antarctic locations. The types were collected by the Swedish Antarctic Expedition. The specific name nudifrons means "naked forehead" referring to the occipital and interorbital regions in juveniles and adults lack of scales compared to L. mizops which Lönnberg thought this taxon was a subspecies of.

== Description ==
Lindbergichthys nudifrons has an oblong body which is compressed towards the tail. It has dorsally positioned eyes which may bulge above the dorsal profile of the head, they eyes are separated by a narrow area which has a width less than the diameter of the eye. The pores in the sensory canal on the head are small. The mouth is small and does not extend to the middle of the eye and there are conical teeth in the jaws. The body is largely covered in ctenoid scales with non-ctenoid scales present on cheeks, gills and on the top of head behind the eyes while the preorbital and lower parts of the head may be naked; The first dorsal fin contains 4-5 spines, it is joined to the second dorsal fin by a membrane between its last spine and the lower two thirds of the first ray of the second dorsal fin> The second dorsal fin has 34-37 soft rays while the anal fin has 33-35 rays. Males of this species are one of the most brightly-colored fishes of the Antarctic, with a warm orange-brown body color and brown bars, orange first and second dorsal fins, silvery white belly and a large black spot and short yellow bars on the dorsal fins. The ventral parts are pale. The pelvic fins are pale yellow with faint brown bars present (these are also present on the caudal fin together with pale yellow bars). There are irregular dark blotches and spots on the body. Most of this coloration is lost after preservation in alcohol, with 5 dark cross-bars formed. There are no scales present on the head. Adult females and immature specimens are nearly uniformly pale yellow or pale yellowish-brown. This species can grow up to 19.5 cm (7.7 in) TL.

== Distribution and habitat ==
Lindbergichthys nudifrons is found in the Atlantic sector of the Southern Ocean along the Scotia Arc from the Antarctic Peninsula to South Georgia, including the South Shetland, South Orkneys and South Sandwich Islands. It is found at depth of 3 to 400 m (9.8 to 1,312.3 ft).

== Biology ==
Lindbergichthys nudifrons mainly feed on polychaetes, amphipods and isopods as adults, however, fish eggs and shrimps are also taken. Juveniles and smaller adults mainly feed on copepods. Spawning takes place from April to October, with sexual maturity reached at 9 cm (4 in) SL. As much as 6,886 eggs of up to 2.5 mm (0.1 in) diameter are laid under the cover of rocks and guarded by the male for about four months. Hatching begins in September and the larvae measure 7 mm (0.3 in) TL.

== Fisheries ==
Lindbergichthys nudifrons is of no interest to commercial fisheries.
