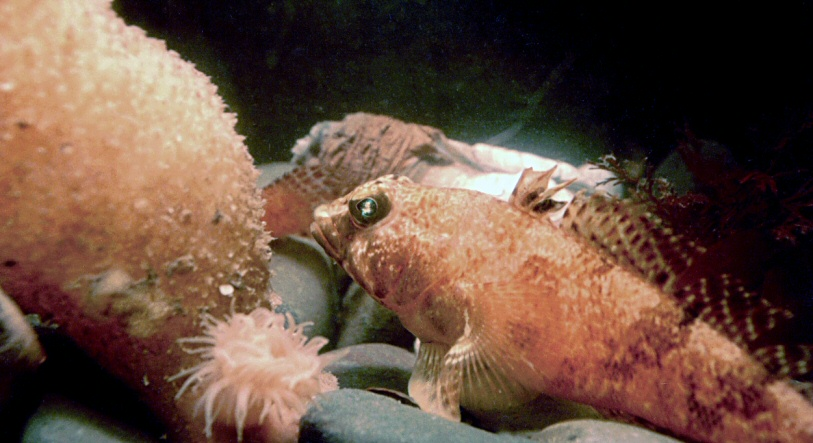
- Lindbergichthys nudifrons

Scientific classification
- Kingdom: Animalia
- Phylum: Chordata
- Class: Actinopterygii
- Order: Perciformes
- Family: Nototheniidae
- Genus: Lindbergichthys; Balushkin, 1976

Type species
- Notothenia mozops Günther, 1880

Synonyms
- Lindbergia Balushkin, 1976

= Lindbergichthys =

Genus of fishes

Lindbergichthys is a genus of marine ray-finned fishes belonging to the family Nototheniidae, the notothens or cod icefishes.

They are native to the Southern Ocean.

== Taxonomy ==
Lindbergichthys was first formally described in 1976 as Lindbergia, a subgenus of Lepidonotothen, by the Soviet ichthyologist Arkadii Vladimirovich Balushkin with Notothenia mizops as the type species. However, Lindbergia was preoccupied by a Gastropod genus described by Riedel in 1959 and in 1979 Balushkin replaced the name with Lindbergichthys.

== Etymology ==
The name of honours the Soviet ichthyologist Georgiĭ Ustinovich Lindberg who died in 1976. The genus is not recognised by all authorities and, for example, is treated as a synonym of Nototheniops by the Catalog of Fishes but is treated as a valid genus by FishBase. Some authorities place this taxon in the subfamily Nototheniinae, but the 5th edition of Fishes of the World does not include subfamilies in the Nototheniidae.

== Species ==
Two recognized species are in this genus:

- Lindbergichthys mizops (Günther, 1880) (Toad notie)
- Lindbergichthys nudifrons (Lönnberg, 1905) (Yellowfin notie)

== Characteristics ==
Lindbergichthys notothens have a variable amount of scales on the head but the snout. lower jaw, nasal area, the area to the front of the eyes and the orbit are always unscaled. The rear part of the head may be scaled or unscaled. The upper lateral line has tubed scales while the middle lateral line has no tubed scales. In smaller fishes the pelvic fins are longer than the pectoral fins but they are equal in size in larger fishes. The caudal fins have 12-14 branched fin rays. The maximum total length is between 15 and 19.5 cm (5.9 and 7.7 in).

== Distribution and habitat ==
Lindbergichthys notothens are found in the Scotia Arc from the Antarctic Peninsula to South Georgia in the Atlantic section of the Southern Ocean and from the Kerguelen Islands, Heard Islands, Crozet Islands and Prince Edward Islands.

== Biology ==
Lindbergichthys notothens are benthic fishes which feed on small benthic invertebrates moving on to fish eggs and small crustaceans when they are larger.
