= Nototheniops =

Scientific classification
- Kingdom: Animalia
- Phylum: Chordata
- Class: Actinopterygii
- Order: Perciformes
- Family: Nototheniidae
- Genus: Nototheniops; Balushkin, 1976

Type species
- Notothenia nybelini Balushkin, 1976

Genus of fishes

Nototheniops is a genus of marine ray-finned fishes belonging to the family Nototheniidae, the notothens or cod icefishes. The species in this genus are native to the Southern Ocean.

== Taxonomy ==
Nototheniops Was first formally described as a subgenus of the genus Lepidonotothen in 1976 by the Soviet ichthyologist Arkadii Vladimirovich Balushkin. The genus has been considered to be monotypic by some authorities with N. larseni as the only species. Some authorities place this genus in the subfamily Nototheniinae, but the 5th edition of Fishes of the World does not include subfamilies in the Nototheniidae. The specific name is a compound of Notothenia, which this genus is closely related to and ops meaning "eyes" referring to its larger eyes.

== Species ==
The recognized species in this genus are:

- Nototheniops larseni (Lönnberg, 1905)
- Nototheniops loesha (Balushkin 1976)
- Nototheniops nybelini (Balushkin, 1976)
- Nototheniops tchizh (Balushkin, 1976)

== Characteristics ==
Nototheniops differs from the closely related Lepidonotothen and Lindbergichthys by having the area to front of the eye. the preorbital, and the snout scaled with unscaled eyes. There is a single lateral line, the upper one, which consists of tubed scales. The pectoral fins are roughly equal in length or longer than the pelvic fins. The first and second spines of the first dorsal fin are roughly equal in height but are taller than the third spine. The last spine of the first dorsal fin is connected to the first ray of the second dorsal fin by a membrane. There are 14-15 branch fin rays in the caudal fin. The front of the jaws have a band of small, sharp, conical teeth which reduces to a single series towards the rear of the jaws becoming uniserial, these back teeth and the outer row of the front teeth are a little bigger than the inner row. The largest recorded total length in this genus is 24 cm (9.4 in) in N. larseni.

== Distribution, habitat and biology ==
Nototheniops are found in the Southern Ocean off the Antarctic Peninsula and in the subantarctic islands and seamounts, especially in the Atlantic and Indian sectors. They are found at depths between 30 and 550 m (98 and 1,804 ft). The larvae and juveniles are pelagic and it is thought they may have a long pelagic phase which helps dispersal, settling to a benthic lifestyle as adults. They feed on crustaceans such as krill, hyperiid amphipods and mysids, juveniles feeding on copepods.
