= Electrona =

Electrona may refer to:

- Electrona (fish), a genus of lanternfishes in the family Myctophidae
- Electrona, Tasmania, a town in Tasmania, Australia
