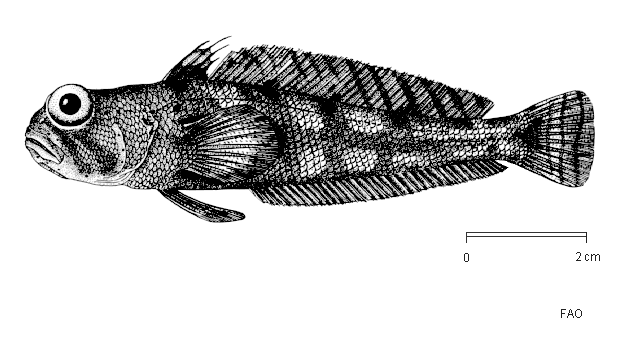
- A drawing of the painted notie (Lepidonotothen mizops) by J.C.Hureau

Scientific classification
- Kingdom: Animalia
- Phylum: Chordata
- Class: Actinopterygii
- Order: Perciformes
- Family: Nototheniidae
- Genus: Lindbergichthys
- Species: L. mizops

Binomial name
- Lindbergichthys mizops (Günther, 1880)

Synonyms
- Notothenia mizops Günther, 1880; Lepidonotothen mizops (Günther, 1880); Nototheniops mizops (Günther, 1880)

= Toad notie =

Species of fish

The toad notie (Lindbergichthys mizops), or toad notothen, is a species of marine ray-finned fish, belonging to the family Nototheniidae, the notothens or cod icefishes. It is native to the Indian sector of the Southern Ocean.

== Taxonomy ==
The toad notie was first formally described in 1880 as Notothenia mizops by the German-born British ichthyologist Albert Günther with the type locality given as Christmas harbor and Howes Foreland on Kerguelen Island at a depth of 120 fathoms. The type was collected on the Challenger Expedition. When the Russian ichthyologist Arkadii Vladimirovich Balushkin described the subgenus Lindbergichthys he designated N. mizops as its type species. The specific name mizops means "large eyes" alluding to this fish having eyes the same size as the larger Lepidonotothen squamifrons.

== Description ==
The toad notie has an oblong body which is compressed towards the tail. It has dorsally positioned eyes which may bulge above the dorsal profile of the head, they eyes are separated by a narrow area which has a width less than the diameter of the eye. The pores in the sensory canal on the head are small. The mouth is small and does not extend to the middle of the eye and there are conical teeth in the jaws. The body is largely cover in ctenoid scales with non-ctenoid scales present on cheeks, gills and on the top of head behind the eyes. The first dorsal fin contains 4-5 spines, it is completely separate from the second dorsal fin which has 34-37 soft rays while the anal fin has 33-35 rays. This species grows to a standard length of 15 cm (5.9 in). There are two series of large, irregular blackish blotches along the body, these join at the midflank but not symmetrically creating a weak chequerboard pattern. There are tow diagonal dark stripes on the cheek, a blackish spot on first dorsal fin and vertical stripes on the second dorsal fin and the anal fin.

== Distribution and habitat ==
The toad noties is found off island groups in the Indian sector of the Southern Ocean. It has been recorded from Heard Islands, the Kerguelen Islands, the Prince Edward Islands and the Crozet Islands. It can be found at depths from 20 to 220 m (66 to 722 ft).

== Biology ==
The toad notie spawns from May to June and occasionally to July. The eggs have a diameter of greater than 1.65 mm.

== Fisheries ==
It is of no interest to commercial fisheries.
