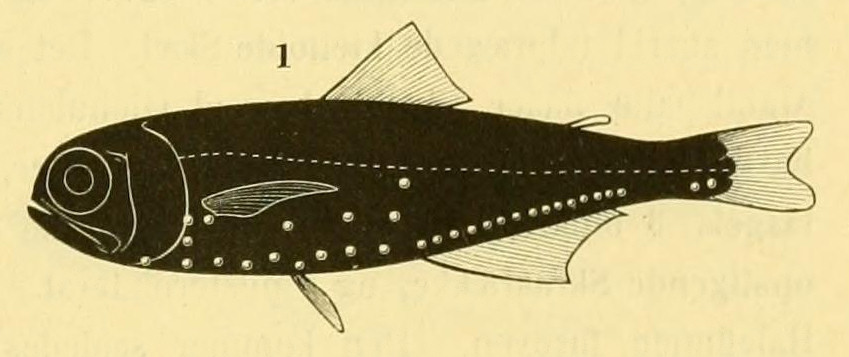

Scientific classification
- Kingdom: Animalia
- Phylum: Chordata
- Class: Actinopterygii
- Order: Myctophiformes
- Family: Myctophidae
- Genus: Electrona
- Species: E. subaspera

Binomial name
- Electrona subaspera (Günther, 1864)

Synonyms
- Scopelus subasper Günther, 1864

= Electrona subaspera =

Species of fish

Electrona subaspera, also known as the rough lanternfish, is a marine, mesopelagic fish. This species is usually found between 0–200 metres (0–656 ft) at night. It occurs circumglobally between the subtropical convergence and the Antarctic polar front, in the southern Atlantic, Indian, and Pacific Oceans.

== Size ==
Its maximum length is 12.7 centimetres (5.0 in).
