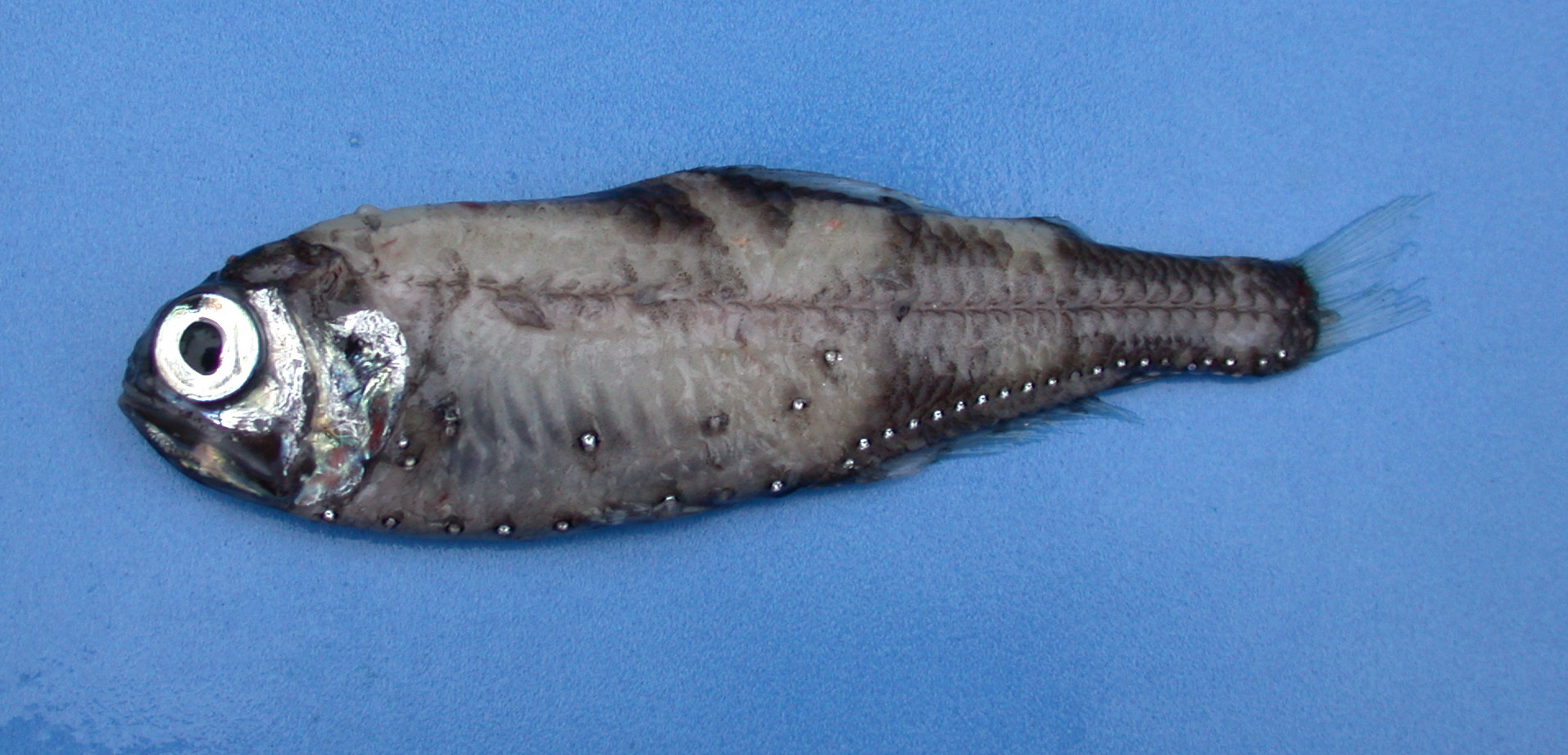

Conservation status
- Least Concern (IUCN 3.1)

Scientific classification
- Kingdom: Animalia
- Phylum: Chordata
- Class: Actinopterygii
- Order: Myctophiformes
- Family: Myctophidae
- Genus: Electrona
- Species: E. antarctica

Binomial name
- Electrona antarctica (Günther, 1878)

Synonyms
- Scopelus antarcticus Günther, 1878; Myctophum antarcticum (Günther, 1878); Scopelus colletti Lütken, 1892

= Electrona antarctica =

Species of fish

The Antarctic lanternfish or Electrona antarctica mainly inhabits the Antarctic deep, twilight zone. It is the dominant species in the Southern Ocean. Research has demonstrated that the larval phase for the Electrona antarctica is between 30 and 47 days. At the same time, the biggest increase in new population spawning is in late November to December. Their life span is about 4–5 years and they mature after 2–3 years. Their maximum length is 12.5 cm. Their feeding depends upon area to area. Small fish primarily feed on copepods, euphausiid larvae, and hyperiids. This species is mainly the nektonic prey species of seabirds in open water. It is an important krill predator and serves as prey for a majority of seabirds. It is one of the southernmost fish species, being recorded as far south as 74°40′S in the Ross Sea.
