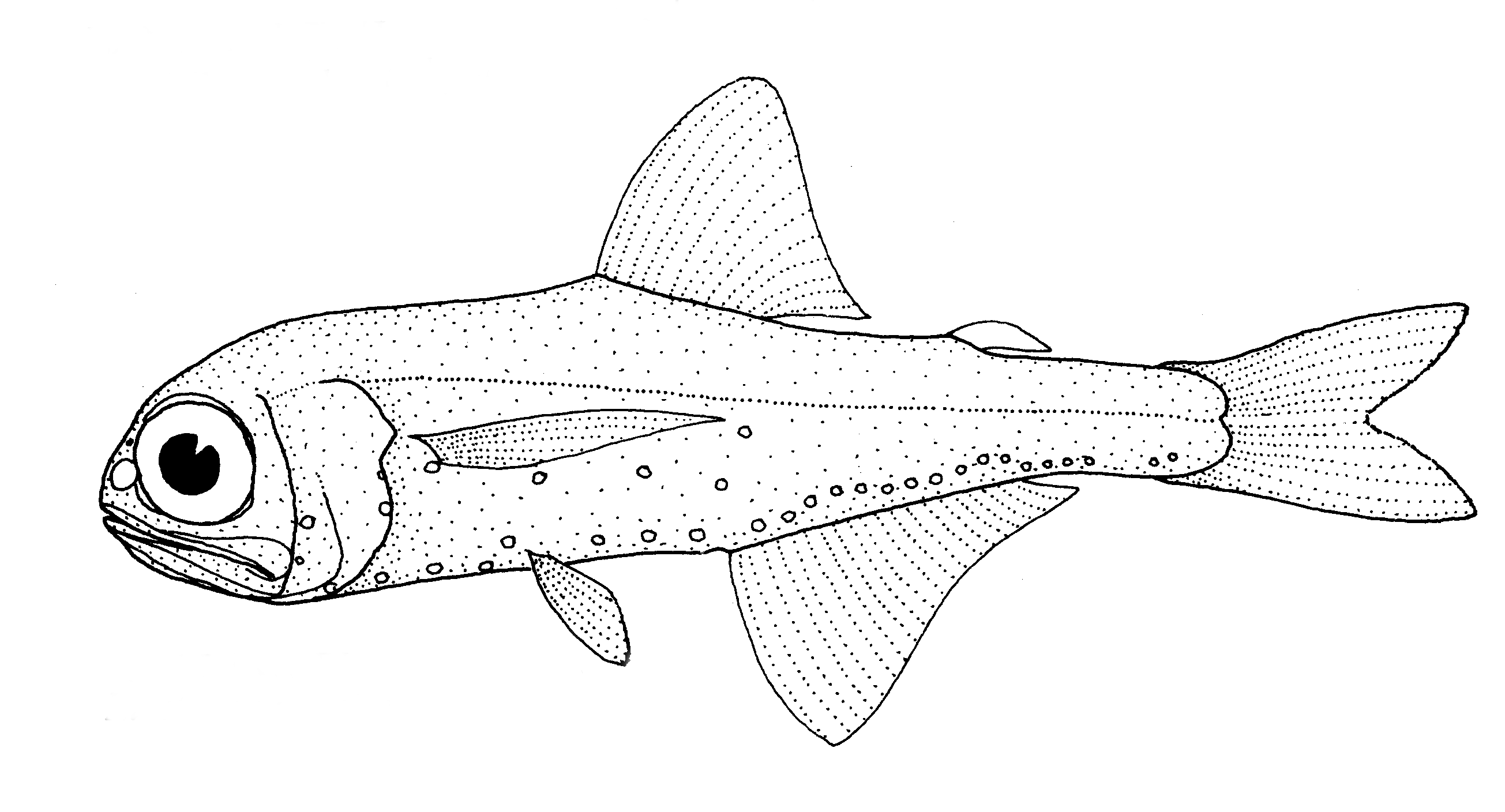
- Drawing by Dr Tony Ayling

Scientific classification
- Domain: Eukaryota
- Kingdom: Animalia
- Phylum: Chordata
- Class: Actinopterygii
- Order: Myctophiformes
- Family: Myctophidae
- Genus: Electrona
- Species: E. paucirastra

Binomial name
- Electrona paucirastra Bolin, 1962

= Electrona paucirastra =

Species of fish

Electrona paucirastra, the belted lanternfish, is a lanternfish found around the globe in the southern hemisphere between 35° S and 48° S. It grows to a length of 7.0 centimetres (2.8 in) SL. It is a mesopelagic species, which can be found close to surface at night-time.
