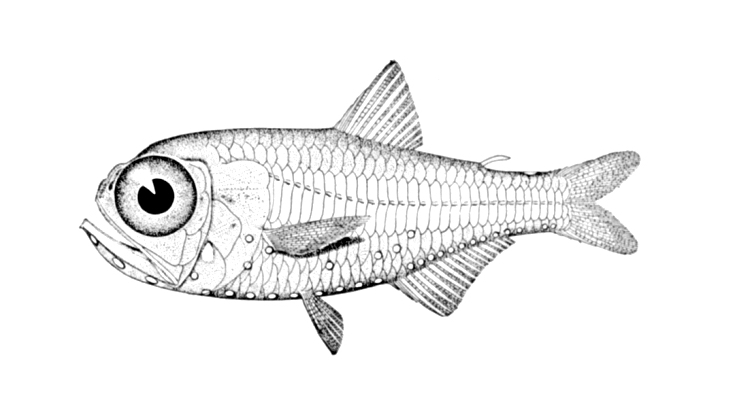

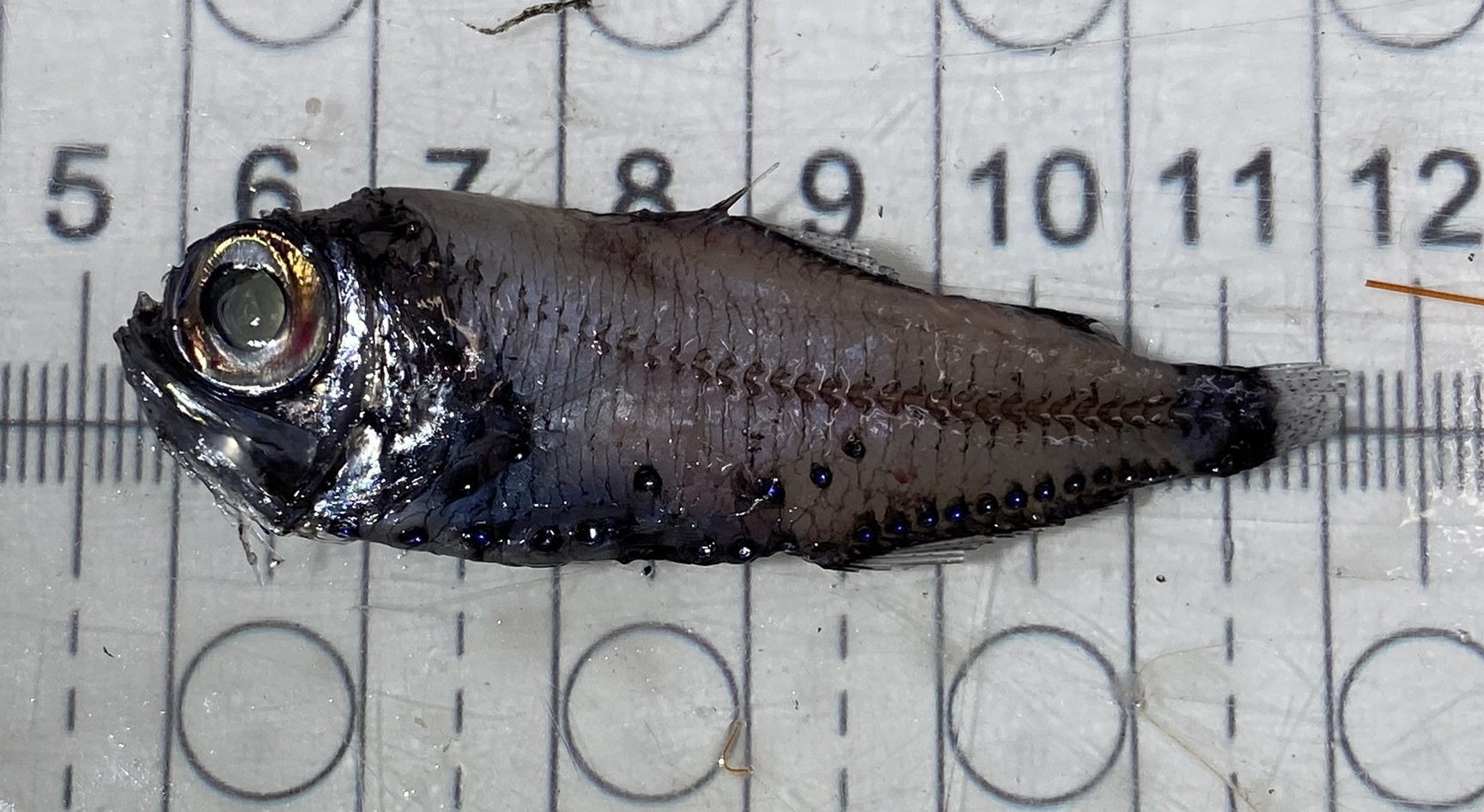
- Freshly caught specimen of Electrona risso

Conservation status
- Least Concern (IUCN 3.1)

Scientific classification
- Kingdom: Animalia
- Phylum: Chordata
- Class: Actinopterygii
- Order: Myctophiformes
- Family: Myctophidae
- Genus: Electrona
- Species: E. risso

Binomial name
- Electrona risso (Cocco, 1829)
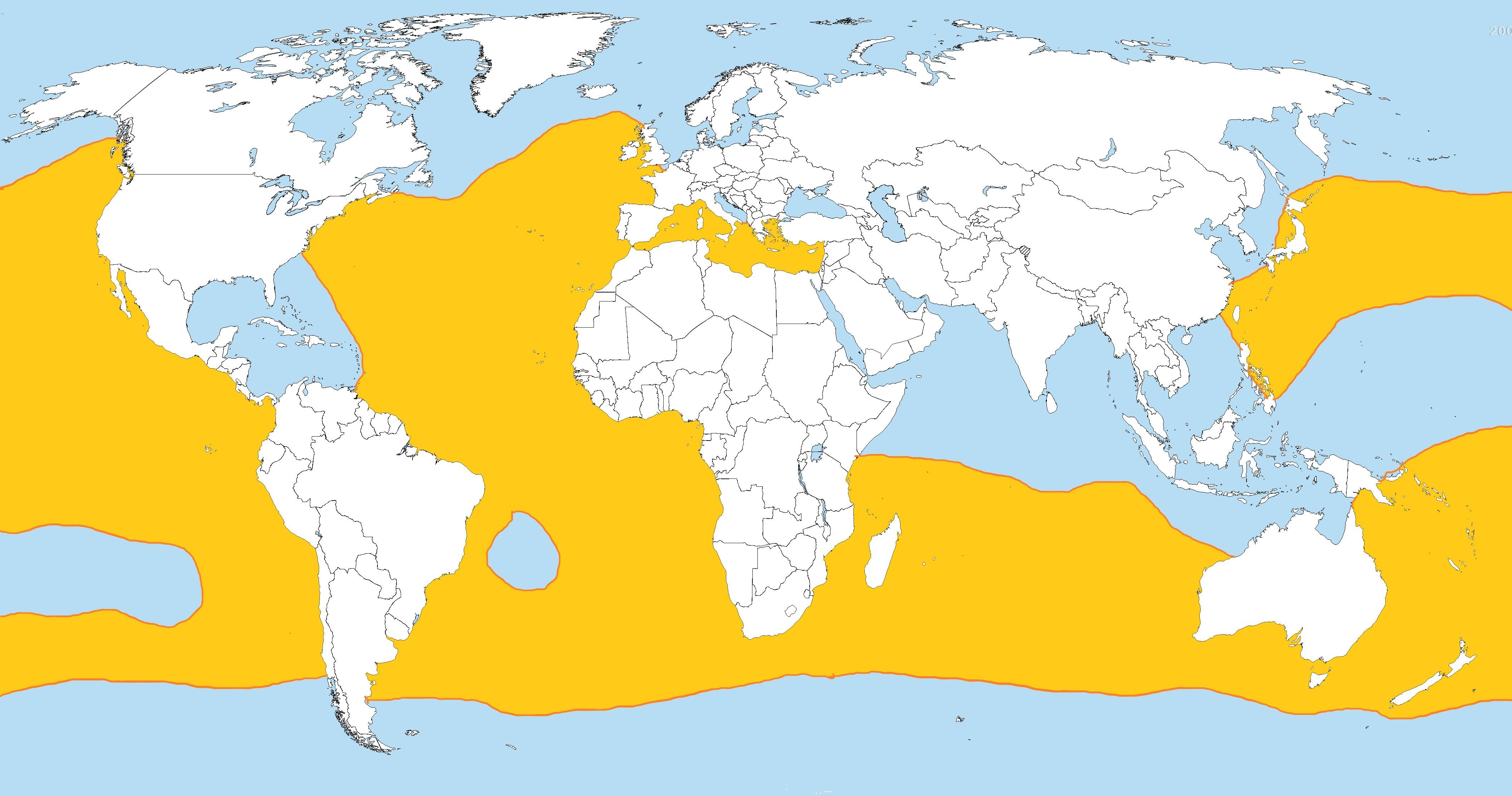

Synonyms
- Scopelus risso Cocco, 1829; Myctophum risso (Cocco, 1829); Electrona rissoi (Cocco, 1829); Scopelus rissoi (Cocco, 1829); Myctophum rissoi (Cocco, 1849)

= Electrona risso =

Species of fish

Electrona risso is a species of myctophiform ray-finned fish in the family Myctophidae, the lanternfishes. It is known commonly as the electric lantern fish, chubby flashlight fish, and Risso's lantern-fish. It is a widespread species of all the oceans.

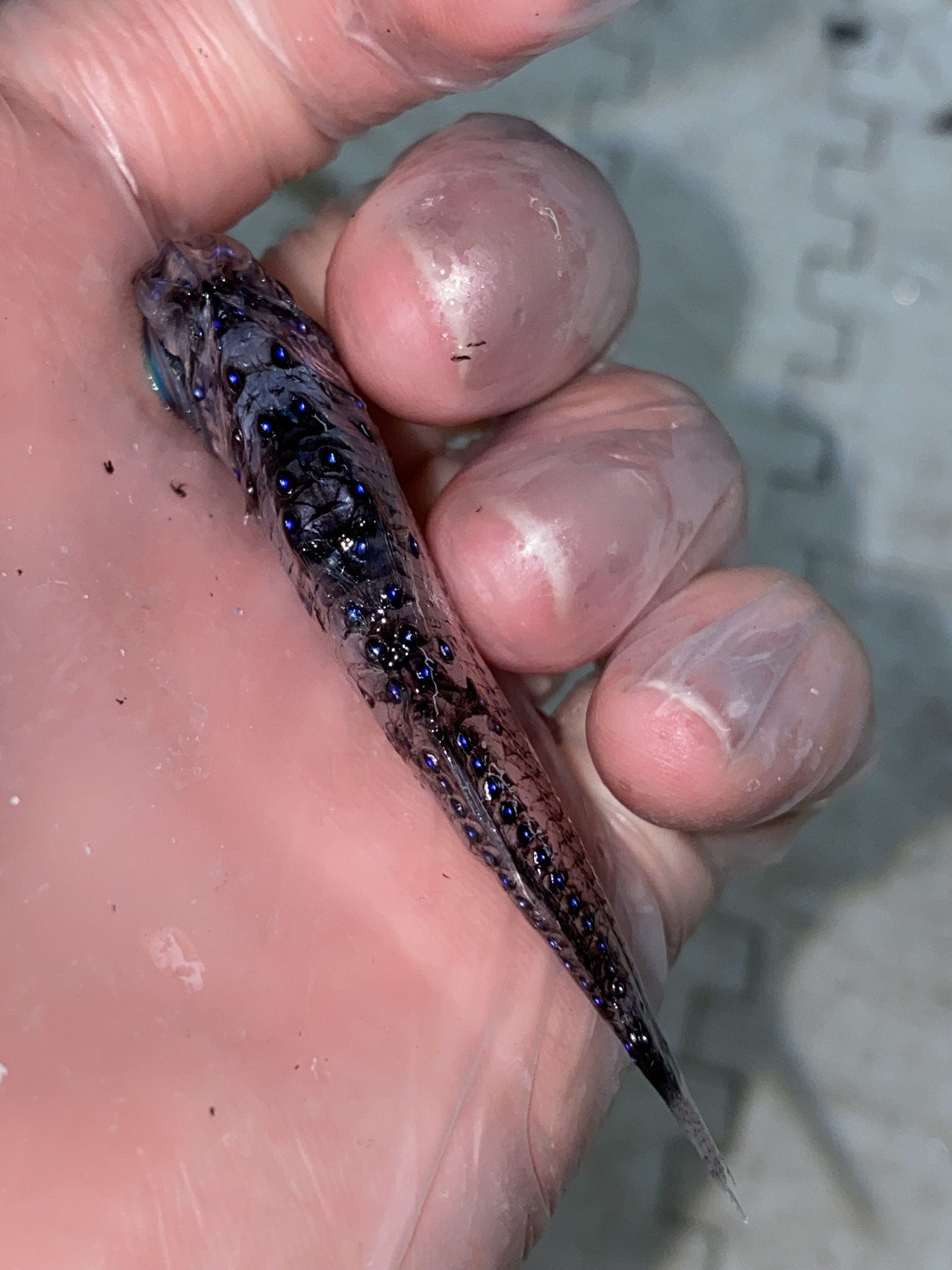
Photophores of Electrona risso, illuminated by camera flash

The male reaches a maximum length of about 8.2 centimeters. It becomes sexually mature at about 5.9 centimeters.

This species is epipelagic to mesopelagic, living at depths of 90 to 820 meters, swimming at shallower depths during daylight hours. Its main food items are copepods.
