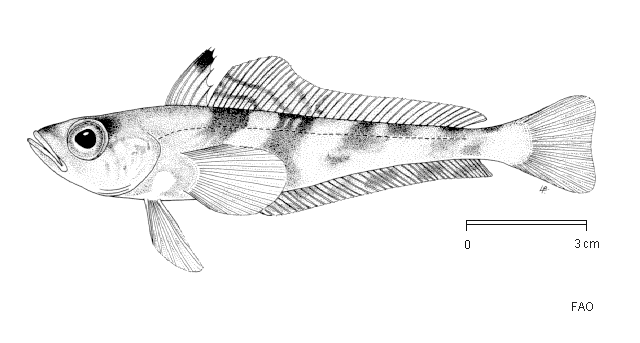
- Illustration by French ichthyologist J.C. Hureau

Scientific classification
- Kingdom: Animalia
- Phylum: Chordata
- Class: Actinopterygii
- Order: Perciformes
- Family: Nototheniidae
- Genus: Nototheniops
- Species: N. larseni

Binomial name
- Nototheniops larseni (Lönnberg, 1905)

Synonyms
- Notothenia larseni Lönnberg, 1905; Lepidonotothen larseni (Lönnberg, 1905)

= Painted notie =

Species of fish

The painted notie (Lepidonotothen larseni), or painted notothen, is a species of marine ray-finned fish, belonging to the family Nototheniidae, the notothens or cod icefishes. It is native to the Southern Ocean.

== Taxonomy ==
The painted notie was first formally described in 1905 as Notothenia larseni by the Swedish zoologist Einar Lönnberg with the type locality given as Shag Rocks, South Georgia Island. Some authorities consider the genus Nototheniops to be monotypic with this species being the only species and all the others, N. loesha, N. nybelini and N. tchizh being its synonyms, arguing that these seemingly allopatric taxa show as much variation within their populations as they do between each other. The specific name honours Carl Anton Larsen who was the chief navigator on the Swedish Antarctic Expedition which collected the type specimen.

== Description ==
The painted notie has a body which has a depth which fits into its standard length 4.5-7.7 times. It has large eyes which have a diameter which is clearly greater than the length of the snout. The body and head is largely covered with ctenoid scales. The lower jaw may be scaled or unscaled. There is a single lateral line, the upper one, which consists of tubed scales. The pectoral fins are roughly equal in length or longer than the pelvic fins. There are 6-7 spines in the first dorsal fin, its first and second spines being roughly equal in height but are taller than the third spine. The last spine of the first dorsal fin is connected to the first ray of the second dorsal fin by a membrane. The second dorsal fin contains 37-39 soft rays while the anal fin has 33-3 soft rays. There are 14-15 branch fin rays in the caudal fin. The front of the jaws have a band of small, sharp, conical teeth which reduces to a single series towards the rear of the jaws becoming uniserial, these back teeth and the outer row of the front teeth are a little bigger than the inner row. This species attains a maximum total length of 24 cm (9.4 in).

== Distribution, habitat and biology ==
The painted notie is found in the Southern Ocean. It is found at depths between They are found at depths between 30 and 550 m (98 and 1,804 ft). The larvae and juveniles are pelagic and it is thought they may have a long pelagic phase which helps dispersal, settling to a benthic lifestyle as adults. They feed on crustaceans such as krill, hyperiid amphipods and mysids, juveniles feeding on copepods. Spawning occurs in June-July off South Georgia, in July and August off Elephant Island and at the Ob’ and Lena Banks, however, at the Crozet Islands it runs from March to June. The larvae hatch in September off South Georgia and in October off the Antarctic Peninsula.
