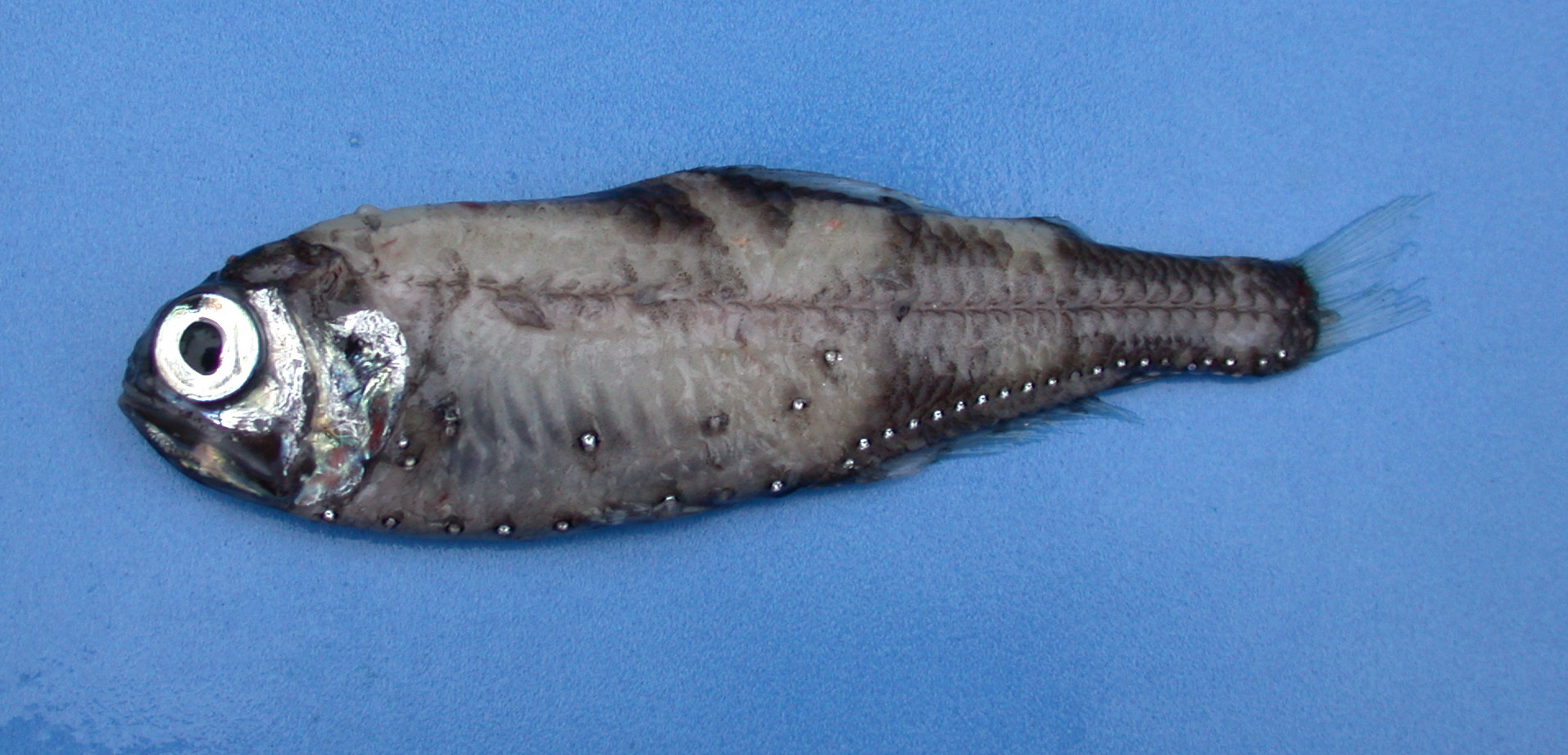
- Electrona antarctica
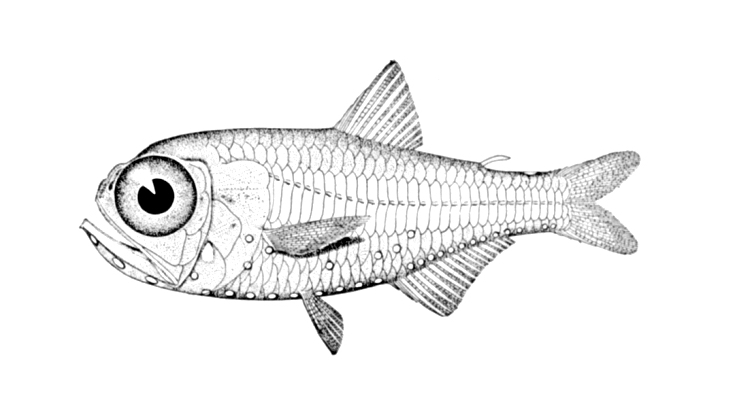
- Electric Lanternfish (E. risso)

Scientific classification
- Domain: Eukaryota
- Kingdom: Animalia
- Phylum: Chordata
- Class: Actinopterygii
- Order: Myctophiformes
- Family: Myctophidae
- Genus: Electrona; Goode & T. H. Bean, 1896

Species
- See text.

= Electrona (fish) =

Electrona Temporal range: 11–0 Ma Late Miocene to Present

Genus of fishes

Electrona is a genus of lanternfishes in the family Myctophidae.

== Species ==
There are currently five recognized species in this genus:

- Electrona antarctica (Günther, 1878) (Antarctic lanternfish)
- Electrona carlsbergi (Tåning, 1932) (Electron subantarctic lanternfish)
- Electrona paucirastra Bolin, 1962 (Belted lanternfish)
- Electrona risso (Cocco, 1829) (Electric lanternfish)
- Electrona subaspera (Günther, 1864) (Rough lanternfish)

== Description ==
Electrona lanternfishes are small, discoid fishes.

== Distribution and ecology ==
While Electrona risso can be found throughout the world, widespread in the Indian, Pacific, Atlantic Oceans, and Mediterranean, the other four species are limited to the southern hemisphere, mostly limited to the Southern Ocean. Their dispersion is dependent on the balance between current-mediated larval dispersal and adult active homing behavior. Besides E. rissoi is E. paucirastra the only species that is found north of the Southern Ocean.E. antarctica mainly inhabits the Antarctic deep and therefore warmer waters. E. carlsbergii inhabits the water south of the Antarctica convergence to the Antarctic coast, and between the Antarctic and sub-Antarctic convergences. Larval forms of many deep-water species are found to inhabit inshore waters. Migration patterns vary between different species, size groups, life history stages, sex, latitude, time and season.

== Diet ==
These fish exhibit a daily migration pattern. During the day they concentrate between 400 and 1000 m. During the night, they migrate close to the surface between 5–100 m. These diel vertical migrations are primarily performed because zooplankton, their main food, is concentrated in the upper layers, while they need to go deep during the day in order to avoid predators.

== Reproduction ==
Electrona have a low fecundity. Females produce eggs the size of 0.7–0.9 mm. Spawning of some species may occur any time during the year. In the Arabian Sea, fish spawn during all seasons but significantly increases during monsoon transition periods (March–June and September–November). The larva exhibit diversity with their shape not similar to the adult and the larvae have a highly stalked eye and trailing intestine.
