= Electrona carlsbergi =

Electrona carlsbergi Temporal range: 11–0 Ma Late Miocene to Present

Scientific classification
- Kingdom: Animalia
- Phylum: Chordata
- Class: Actinopterygii
- Order: Myctophiformes
- Family: Myctophidae
- Genus: Electrona
- Species: E. carlsbergi

Binomial name
- Electrona carlsbergi (Tåning, 1932)

Synonyms
- Myctophum carlsbergi Tåning, 1932

Species of deep-sea fish

Electrona carlsbergi, the Electron subantarctic lanternfish, is a species of lanternfish inhabiting the Southern Ocean, which surrounds various Subantarctic and Antarctic islands.

== Etymology ==
The fish is named in honor of the Carlsberg Laboratory, Copenhagen, the research arm of the Carlsberg Foundation, which financed the Dana Expedition that collected the type specimen.

== Description ==
This species reaches a length of 11.2 cm (4.4 in). Their life span is about five years, in which they mature after 2–3 years. They feed mainly on copepods, but also on other crustaceans such as hyperiids (amphipods) and euphausiids (krill).

This species inhabits waters to the south of the Antarctic Convergence up to the Antarctic coast.
