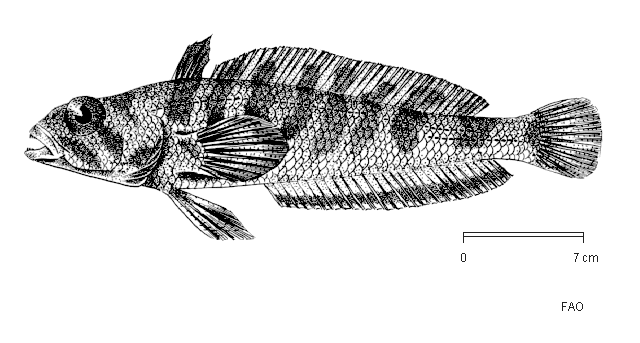
- A drawing of Lepidonotothen squamifrons, the grey rockcod by J.C.Hureau

Scientific classification
- Kingdom: Animalia
- Phylum: Chordata
- Class: Actinopterygii
- Order: Perciformes
- Family: Nototheniidae
- Genus: Lepidonotothen; Balushkin, 1976
- Species: L. squamifrons

Binomial name
- Lepidonotothen squamifrons (Günther, 1880)

Synonyms
- Notothenia kempi Norman, 1937; Notothenia squamifrons Günther, 1880; Notothenia squamifrons squamifrons Günther, 1880; Notothenia macrophthalma Norman, 1937; Notothenia kempi Norman, 1937; Lepidonotothen kempi (Norman, 1937); Lepidonotothen macrophthalma (Norman, 1937); Notothenia brevipectoralis Hureau, 1966; Notothenia squamifrons atlantica Permitin & Sazonov, 1974

= Grey rockcod =

Species of fish

The grey rockcod (Lepidonotothen squamifrons), also known as the grey notothen, stripe-eyes notothen or stripe-eyed rockcod, is a species of marine ray-finned fish belonging to the family Nototheniidae, the notothens or cod icefishes. It is native to the Southern Ocean. The grey rockcod feeds mainly on macrozooplankton and is of minor importance to commercial fisheries. It is the only species in the genus Lepidonotothen.

== Taxonomy ==
The grey rockcod was first formally described in 1880 as Notothenia squamifrons by the German-born British ichthyologist Albert Günther with the type locality given as Kerguelen Island. The type was collected during the Challenger Expedition. In 1976 the Russian ichthyologist Arkadii Vladimirovich Balushkin placed it in the genus Lepidonotothen, this genus is currently regarded as monotypic with this species as its sole member. However, other authorities regard Lepidonotothen kempi as a valid species. Some authorities place this taxon in the subfamily Nototheniinae, but the 5th edition of Fishes of the World does not include subfamilies in the Nototheniidae. The name of the genus is a compound of lepido meaning "scaled", an allusion to the scales on the top of the head and jaws of this species, and notothen, indicating that it is a notothen. The specific name is a combination of squamis which means "scale" and frons meaning "forehead", a reference to the head being covered with small scales almost as far as the nostrils.

== Description ==
The grey rockcod has an oblong body that is compressed towards the tail. It has dorsally positioned eyes that may bulge above the dorsal profile of the head, the eyes are separated by a narrow area that has a width less than the diameter of the eye. The pores in the sensory canal on the head are small. The mouth is small and does not extend to the middle of the eye and there are no large canine-like teeth. The head is almost completely scaled. There are two lateral lines, an upper and a middle line, both consisting of tubed scales. Its pectoral fins are smaller than the pelvic fins. There are 15–17 branched rays in the rounded or truncate caudal fin. The first dorsal fin has 4–5 spines, the second dorsal fin has 36–37 soft rays while the anal fin contains 29–33 soft rays. This species attains a maximum total length of 55 cm (22 in), although 35 cm (14 in) is more typical. The colour of the body is greyish above marked with 9 non-uniform, wide, dark bars that join on the underside. There is a dark stripe along the front edge of the snout extending to the lower margin of the preoperculum with a second dark stripe from the lower orbit to the angle of the preopeculum. There are two dark stripes on the upper part of the orbit. The posterior part of the first dorsal fin is blackish.

== Distribution and habitat ==
The grey rockcod is found in the Southern Ocean a far north as the Falkland Islands and the Burdwood Bank, South Georgia Island and Bouvet Island. This species has also been recorded from sub-Antarctic islands and the far south of the Indian and Pacific Oceans. It is a benthopelagic fish which is found at depths of 10 to 900 m (33 to 2,953 ft) but it is most frequent at depths of 195 to 312 m (640 to 1,024 ft).

== Biology ==
The grey rockcod is the dominant fish species in the waters off the Kerguelen Islands, which is where the greatest plankton productivity in the Southern Ocean takes place, and this population has one of the fastest rates of growth. These fish reach sexual maturity at lengths of 34–36 cm (13–14 in) at ages of 8 or 9 years old, faster than any other population which has been studied. The fish in this population also attain the larger known sizes than fish from the Crozet Islands or Lena Seamounts, although South Georgia is where the largest fish have been recorded and where the rate of growth is faster than at Kerguelen.

Spawning occurs at the end of October in the Kerguelen and Crozet islands while in South Georgia it happens in February. Embryonic development has been estimated to takes around 2 to 3 months. In South Georgia, postlarvae which were around 30 mm (1.2 in) in standard length were caught in December. Females at Kerguelen could lay between 48,650 and 196,150 eggs in a season at total lengths between 28 and 44 cm (11 and 17 in) while at South Georgia they can lay 69,000–185,000 at total lengths between 35 and 50 cm (14 and 20 in). The eggs have a diameter of 1.4 to 1.7 mm (0.055 to 0.067 in).

This species feeds mainly on larger zooplankton, mostly crustaceans, cnidarians and salps, as well as fishes found in the water column.

== Fisheries ==
The grey rockcod is exploited by commercial fisheries. In the Kerguelen Islands only the marbled rockcod (Notothenia rossii) and the mackerel icefish (Champsocephalus gunnari) are a more important catch than this species. However, it is of much less importance to fisheries around South Georgia.
