= Cod fisheries =

Fisheries for cod

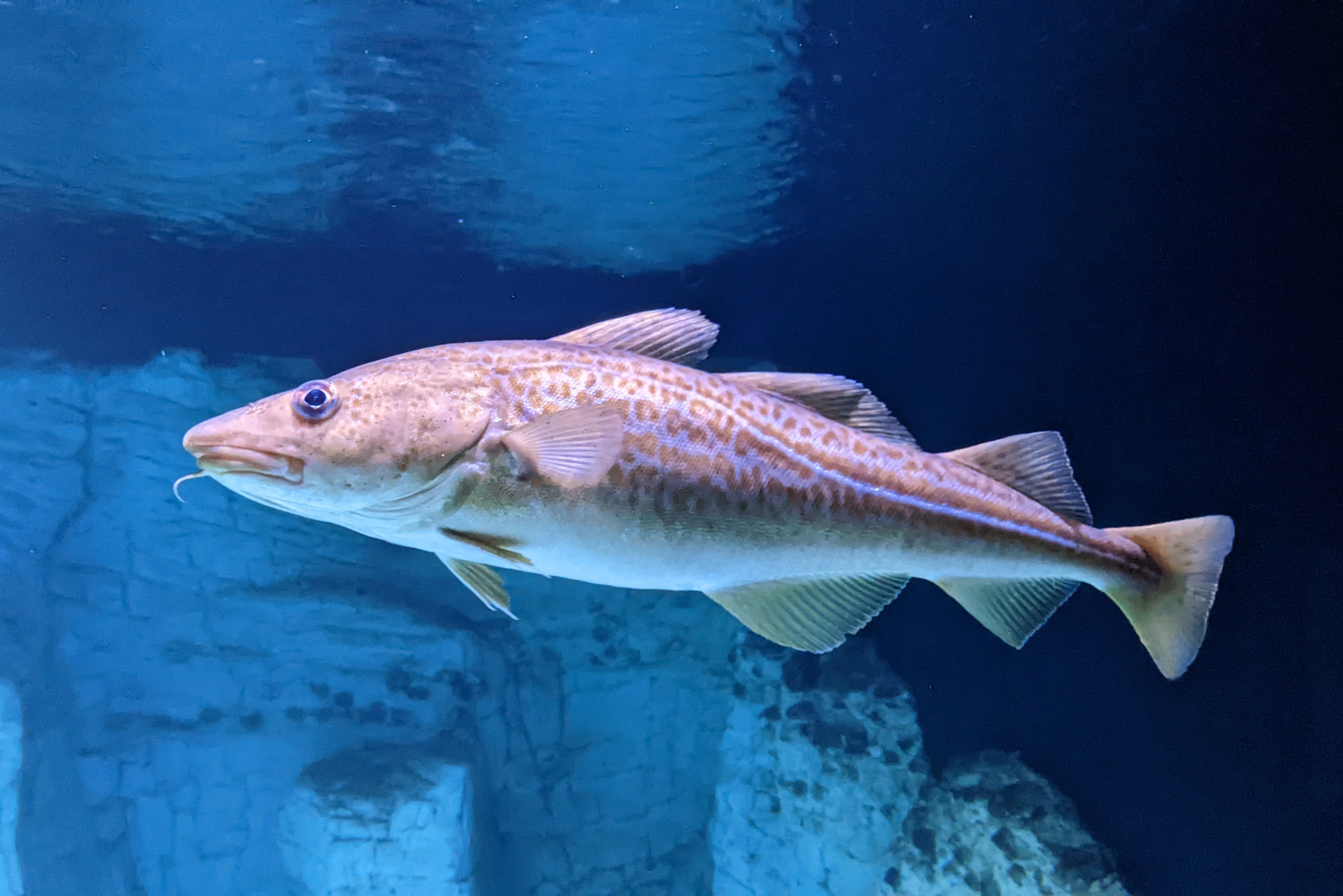
Atlantic cod (Gadus morhua)

Pacific cod (Gadus macrocephalus)

Cod fisheries are fisheries for cod. Cod is the common name for fish of the genus Gadus, belonging to the family Gadidae, and this article is confined to three species that belong to this genus: the Atlantic cod, the Pacific cod and the Greenland cod. Although there is a fourth species of the cod genus Gadus, Alaska pollock, it is commonly not called cod and therefore currently not covered here.

Cod are demersal fish found in huge schools confined to temperate waters in the northern hemisphere. Atlantic cod are found in the colder waters and deeper sea regions throughout the Northern Atlantic. The Pacific cod is found in both eastern and western regions of the Pacific. Atlantic cod can grow to 2 metres (6.6 ft) in length. Its average weight is 5 to 12 kilograms (11 to 26 lb), but specimens weighing up to 100 kilograms (220 lb) have been recorded. Pacific cod are smaller, and may grow up to 49 centimetres (19 in) and weigh up to 15 kilograms (33 lb). Cod feed on mollusks, crabs, starfish, worms, squid, and small fish. Some migrate south in winter to spawn. A large female lays up to five million eggs in mid-ocean, a very small number of which survive.

Cod has been an important economic commodity in international markets since the Viking period (around A.D. 800). Cod are popular as a food fish with a mild flavour, low fat content and a dense white flesh. When cooked, cod is moist and flaky. Cod livers are processed to make cod liver oil. Cod are currently at risk from overfishing.

== Species ==
In the United Kingdom, Atlantic cod is one of the most common kinds of fish to be found in fish and chips, along with haddock and plaice. It is also well known for being widely consumed in Portugal and the Basque Country, where it is considered a treasure of the nation's cuisine.

Cod are highly prolific, producing several million eggs at each spawning. This contributes to their high population numbers, which, in turn, makes commercial fishing relatively easy. Adult cod are active hunters, feeding on sand eels, whiting, haddock, small cod, squid, crabs, lobsters, mussels, worms, mackerel, and molluscs, supplementing their diets. Young cod eat the same but avoid larger prey.

=== Atlantic cod ===
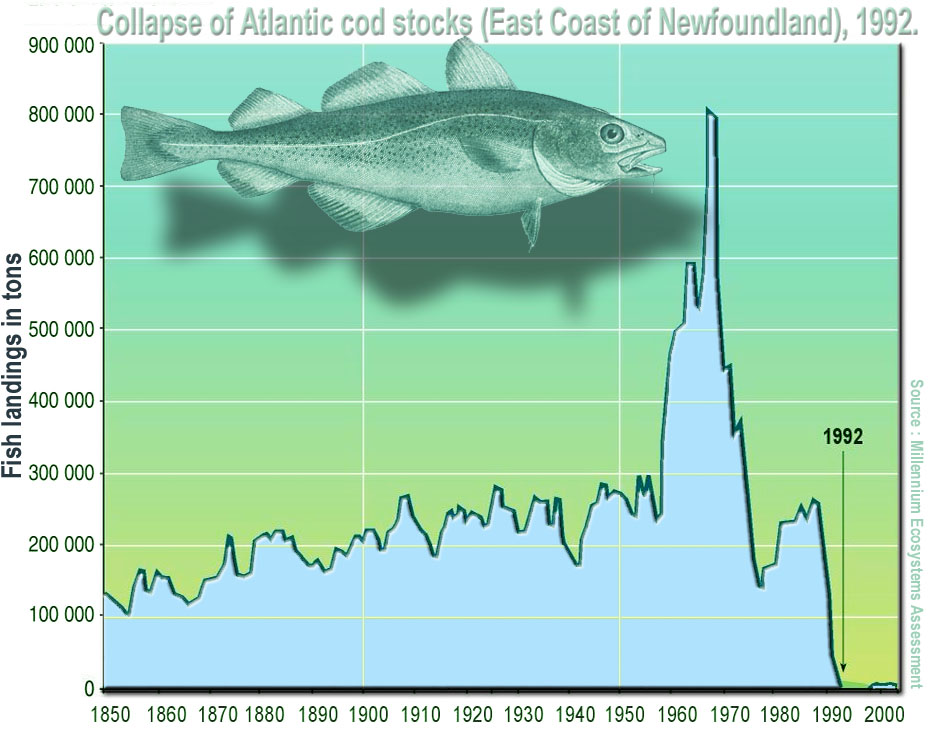
Northwest Atlantic cod stocks were severely overfished in the 1970s and 1980s, leading to their abrupt collapse in 1992

Atlantic cod is a well-known demersal food fish belonging to the family Gadidae. In the western Atlantic Ocean, cod has a distribution north of Cape Hatteras, North Carolina, and round both coasts of Greenland; in the eastern Atlantic it is found from the Bay of Biscay north to the Arctic Ocean, including the North Sea and Norwegian Sea, areas around Iceland and the Barents Sea.

It can grow to 2 metres (6 ft 7 in) in length. Its average weight is 5 to 12 kilograms (11 to 26 lb), but specimens weighing up to 100 kilograms (220 lb) have been recorded. Sexual maturity is generally attained between 2 and 4 years, but can be as late as 8 years in the northeast Arctic. The Atlantic cod can change colour at certain water depths, and has two distinct colour phases: grey-green and reddish brown. Colouring is brown to green with spots on the dorsal side, shading to silver ventrally. A lateral line is clearly visible. Its habitat ranges from the shoreline down to the continental shelf.

Several cod stocks collapsed in the 1990s (declined by >95% of maximum historical biomass) and have failed to recover even with the cessation of fishing. This absence of the apex predator has led to a trophic cascade in many areas. While the north west Atlantic cod stocks have not yet recovered fully from overfishing in the past, most stocks in the East Atlantic are currently in good condition and well managed, such as those at North Norway and Svalbard.

In the early 2000s the European Union introduced a Cod Recovery Plan which covers the North Sea (incl. the Eastern English Channel and the Kattegat), the Irish Sea and waters to the West of Scotland where cod has continued to decline. It is broadly accepted that the plan has been a failure and has not delivered its objective of recovering the cod stocks in these areas because of the plan's over reliance on effort (days-at-sea) that created an indiscriminate ‘race to fish’ which in fact increased fishing mortality on the biomass for cod, on other demersal species and had a destructive impact on the benthic zone of the seabed where it is intensely fished. On the other hand, conservation initiatives undertaken by fishermen working in cooperation with government, such catch-quota management, have made a very meaningful contribution to the recovery of cod in the central and northern North Sea. The biomass of cod in the Irish Sea and West of Scotland remains depleted. A temporary cod plan that excludes a days-at-sea regime will apply from 1 January 2017 before this is superseded by new multi-species plans for individual sea basins; e.g. the North Sea multi-annual plan which was proposed by the European Commission in August 2016.

=== Pacific cod ===
The Pacific cod is an important commercial food species. It has three separate dorsal fins, and the catfish-like whiskers on its lower jaw. In appearance, it is similar to the Atlantic Cod. A bottom dweller, it is found mainly along the continental shelf and upper slopes with a range around the rim of the North Pacific Ocean, from the Yellow Sea to the Bering Strait, along the Aleutian Islands, and south to about Los Angeles, down to the depths of 900 metres (3,000 ft). They may grow up to 78–79 cm and weigh up to 15 kilograms (33 lb). It is found in huge schools. In Northwest Pacific catches of Pacific cod by the United States trawl fishery and joint-venture fisheries increased from less than 1,000 tonnes (1,100 short tons) in 1979 to nearly 91,000 tonnes (100,000 short tons) in 1984 and reached 430,196 tonnes (474,210 short tons) in 1995. Today, catches are tightly regulated, and the Pacific cod quota is split among fisheries that use hook and line gear, pots, and bottom trawls.

=== Greenland cod ===
Greenland cod is generally sombre-coloured, ranging from tan to brown to silvery. Its appearance is similar to that of other cod species; generally heavy-bodied, elongate, usually with a stout caudal peduncle. They can grow to a length of 80 centimetres (31 in).

They are bottom fishes inhabiting inshore waters and continental shelves, up to depths of 200 metres (660 ft). Their range covers the Arctic Ocean and Northwest Atlantic Ocean from Alaska to West Greenland, then south along the Canadian coast to the Gulf of St. Lawrence and Cape Breton Island generally from 45 to 75 degrees north. Their flesh is whitish and flaky but firmer and tougher and less desirable than that of the Atlantic cod. The stock of Greenland cod has been strongly reduced in recent years.

== Distribution ==
=== Northeast Atlantic cod ===
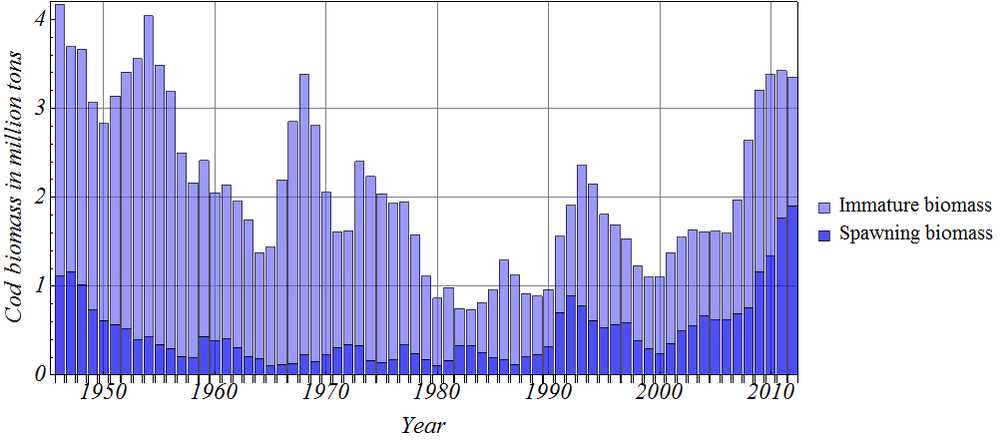
Estimated biomasses of North-East Arctic Cod 1959–2006 in million tonnes. The estimates are performed by the Arctic Fisheries Working Group of ICES, published in the ICES Report AFWG 2007, ACFM:16. Estimation method: Standard VPA.

The Northeast Atlantic is the world's largest population of cod. By far the largest part of this population is the North-East Arctic Cod, as it is labelled by the ICES, or the Arcto-Norwegian cod stock, also referred to as skrei, a Norwegian name meaning something like "the wanderer", distinguishing it from coastal cod. The North-East Arctic Cod is found in the Barents Sea area. This stock spawns in March and April along the Norwegian coast, about 40% around the Lofoten archipelago. Newly hatched larvae drift northwards with the coastal current while feeding on larval copepods. By summer the young cod reach the Barents Sea where they stay for the rest of their life, until their spawning migration. As the cod grow, they feed on krill and other small crustaceans and fish. Adult cod primarily feed on fish such as capelin and herring. The northeast Arctic cod also shows cannibalistic behaviour. In 2012 the biomass of the Northeast Atlantic cod stock was estimated to be at an all-time high since scientists started observing stock status some 100 years ago.

The North Sea cod stock is primarily fished by European Union member states and Norway. In 1999 the catch was divided among Denmark (31%), Scotland (25%), the rest of the United Kingdom (12%), the Netherlands (10%), Belgium, Germany and Norway (17%). In the 1970s, the annual catch rose to between 200,000 - 300,000 tons. Due to concerns about overfishing, catch quotas were repeatedly reduced in the 1980s and 1990s. In 2003, ICES stated that there is a high risk of stock collapse if current exploitation levels continue, and recommended a moratorium on catching Atlantic cod in the North Sea during 2004. However, agriculture and fisheries ministers from the Council of the European Union endorsed the EU/Norway Agreement and set the total allowable catch (TAC) 27,300 tons.

Baltic Sea cod are divided into two stocks: Western Baltic cod and Eastern Baltic cod. In 2013 the main catches of Western Baltic cod were by Denmark (55%), Germany (25%) and Sweden (13%), and the main catches of Eastern Baltic cod were by Poland (38%), Denmark (19%) and Sweden (17% ). The Eastern Baltic cod stock had quite low abundance until the 1970s, but then grew rapidly due to low fishing pressure and favourable environmental conditions for egg and larvae survival (high salinity, oxygen amount and abundance of prey copepods). In the late 1980s, stock size declined as a result of overfishing and degradation of spawning areas (decreased oxygen amount in the deeper zones of the Eastern Baltic). The stock recovered somewhat in 2010, but concentrated mainly in Bornholm Basin.

==== Spawning ====
The spawning stock of North-East Arctic cod was more than a million tons following World War II, but declined to a historic minimum of 118,000 tons in 1987. The North-East Arctic cod catch reached a historic maximum of 1,343,000 tons in 1956, and bottomed out at 212,000 tons in 1990. Since 2000, the spawning stock has increased quite quickly, helped by low fishing pressure. However, there are worries about a decreased age at first spawning (often an early sign of stock collapse), combined with the level of discards and unreported catches. The total catch in 2003 was 521,949 tons, the major fishers being Norway (191,976 tons) and Russia (182,160 tons).

=== Northwest Atlantic cod ===
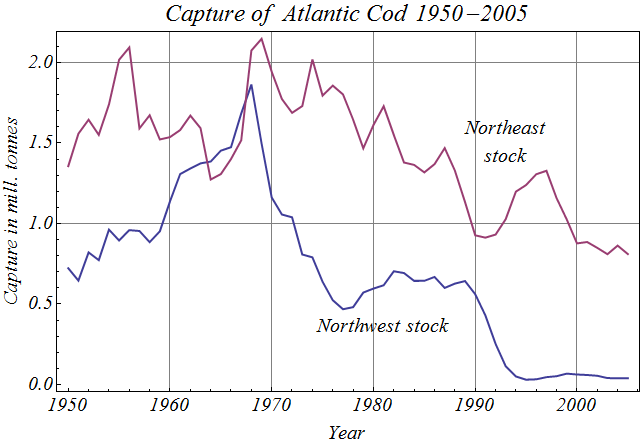
Capture of Atlantic Cod 1950–2005. (FAO)

The Northwest Atlantic cod has been regarded as heavily overfished throughout its range, resulting in a crash in the fishery in the United States and Canada during the early 1990s.

Newfoundland's northern cod fishery can be traced back to the 16th century. "On average, about 300,000 tonnes (330,000 short tons) of cod was landed annually until the 1960s, when advances in technology enabled factory trawlers, many of them foreign, to take larger catches. By 1968, landings for the fish peaked at 800,000 tonnes (880,000 short tons) before a gradual decline set in. With the reopening of the limited cod fisheries last year, nearly 2,700 tonnes (3,000 short tons) of cod were hauled in. Today, it's estimated that offshore cod stocks are at one per cent of what they were in 1977,"

Technologies that contributed to the collapse of Atlantic Cod include engine-powered vessels and frozen food compartments aboard ships. Engine power vessels had larger nets, larger engines, and better navigation. The capacity to catch fish became limitless. In addition, sonar technology gave an edge to catching and detecting fish. Sonar was originally developed during World War II to locate enemy submarines, but was later applied to locating schools of fish. These new technologies, as well as bottom-trawlers that destroyed entire ecosystems, contributed to the collapse of Atlantic Cod. They were vastly different from old techniques used, such as hand lines and long lines.

The fishery has yet to recover, and may not recover at all because of a possibly stable change in the food chain. Atlantic cod was a top-tier predator, along with haddock, flounder and hake, feeding upon smaller prey such as herring, capelin, shrimp and snow crab. With the large predatory fish removed, their prey has had a population explosion and have become the top predators.

=== Population tracking ===
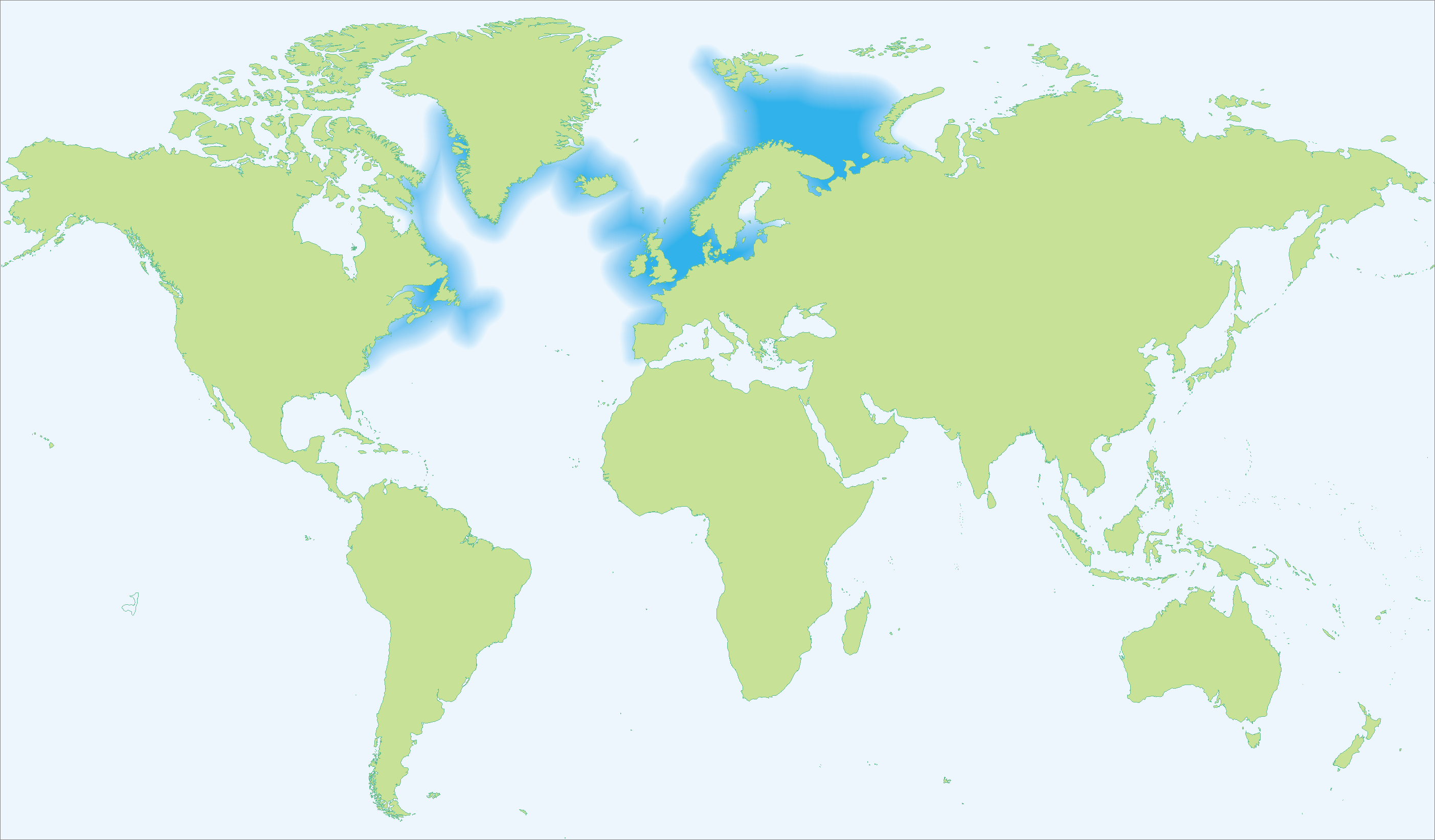
Gadus morhua (Atlantic cod) range map

Cod populations or stocks can differ significantly both in appearance and biology. For instance, the cod stocks of the Baltic Sea are adapted to low-salinity water. Organisations such as the Northwest Atlantic Fishery Organization (NAFO) and ICES divide the cod into management units or stocks; however these units are not always biologically distinguishable stocks. Some major stocks/management units on the Canadian/US shelf are the Southern Labrador-Eastern Newfoundland stock (NAFO divisions 2J3KL), the Northern Gulf of St. Lawrence stock (NAFO divisions 3Pn4RS), the Northern Scotian Shelf stock (NAFO divisions 4VsW), which all lie in Canadian waters, and the Georges Bank and Gulf of Maine stocks in United States waters. In the European Atlantic, there are numerous separate stocks: on the shelves of Iceland, the coast of Norway, the Barents Sea, the Faroe Islands, off western Scotland, the North Sea, the Irish Sea, the Celtic Sea and in the Baltic Sea.

== History ==
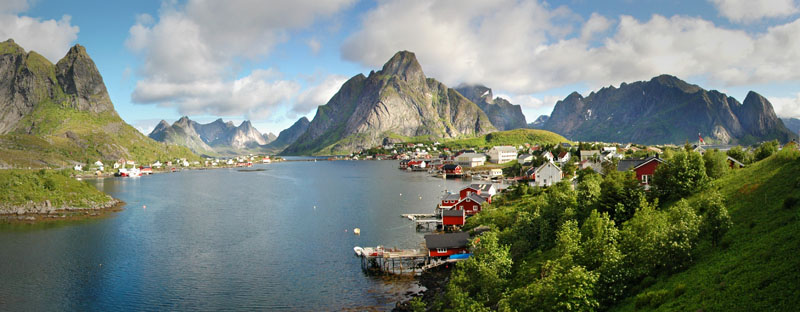
For hundreds of years a community of fishing villages in the archipelago of Lofoten, Norway, was involved in the great cod fisheries. These villages were centred around what is now the village of Reine (pictured).

Cod has been an important economic commodity in an international market since the Viking period (around AD 800). Norwegians used dried cod during their travels, and soon a dried cod market developed in southern Europe. This market has lasted for more than 1,000 years, passing through periods of Black Death, wars and other crises and still is an important Norwegian fish trade. The Portuguese since the 15th century have been fishing cod in the North Atlantic, and clipfish is widely eaten and appreciated in Portugal.

The Basques also played an important role in the cod trade. Basque fishermen were present in Newfoundland and Labrador from at least 1517 onward, predating all recorded European settlements in the region except those of the Norse. Basque fishing expeditions led to significant trade and cultural exchanges with Native Americans. A fringe theory suggests Basque sailors first arrived in North America prior to Columbus' voyages to the New World (some sources suggest the late 14th century as a tentative date) but kept the destination a secret in order to avoid competition over the fishing resources of the North American coasts. However, there is no historical or archaeological evidence to support this claim.

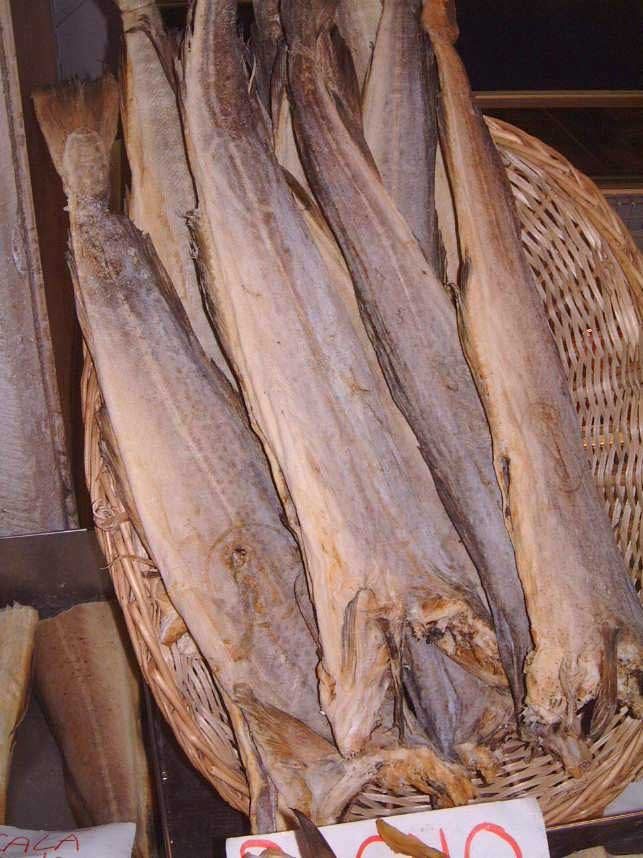
Stockfish

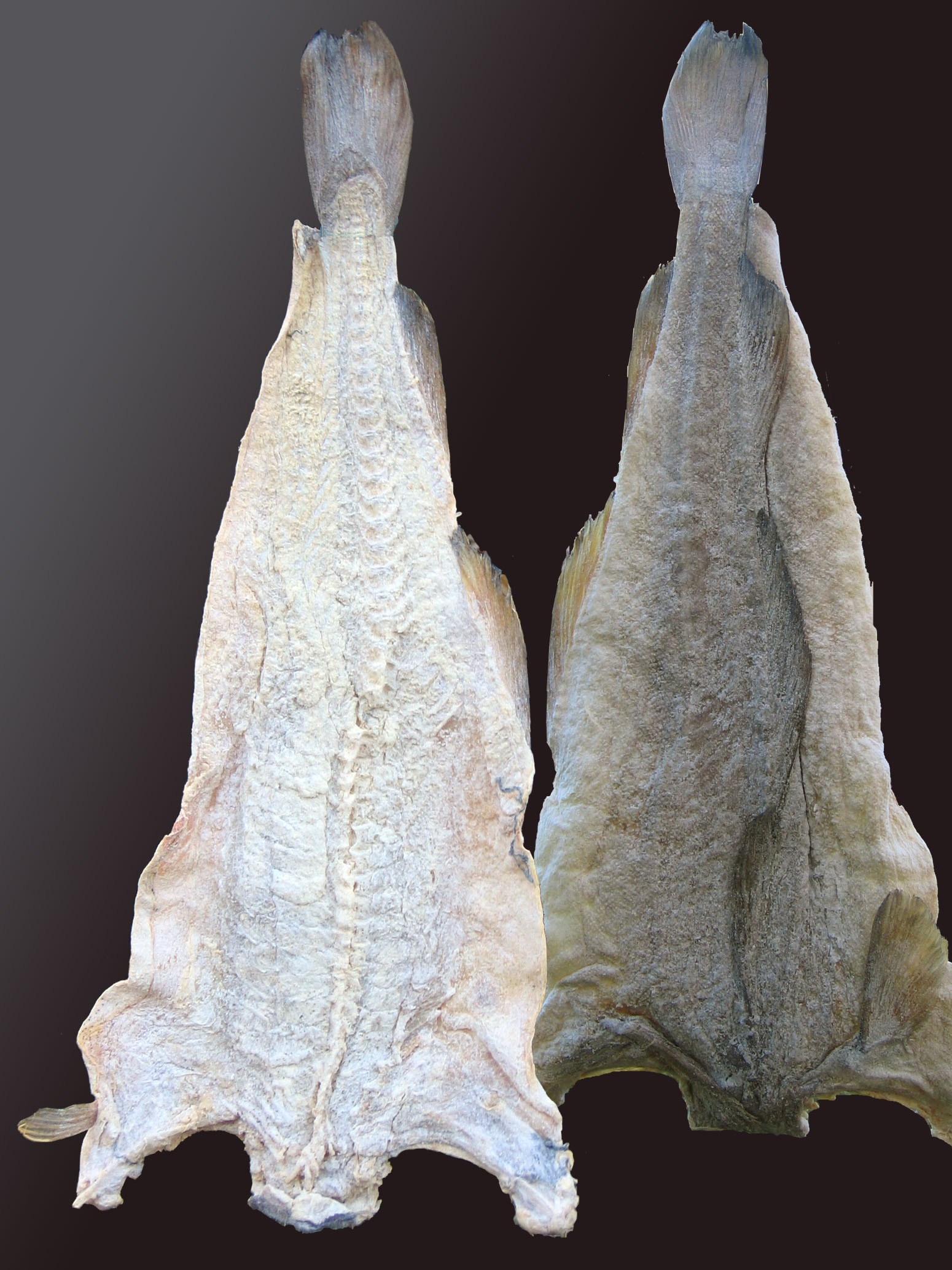
Salted and dried cod, produced in Norway

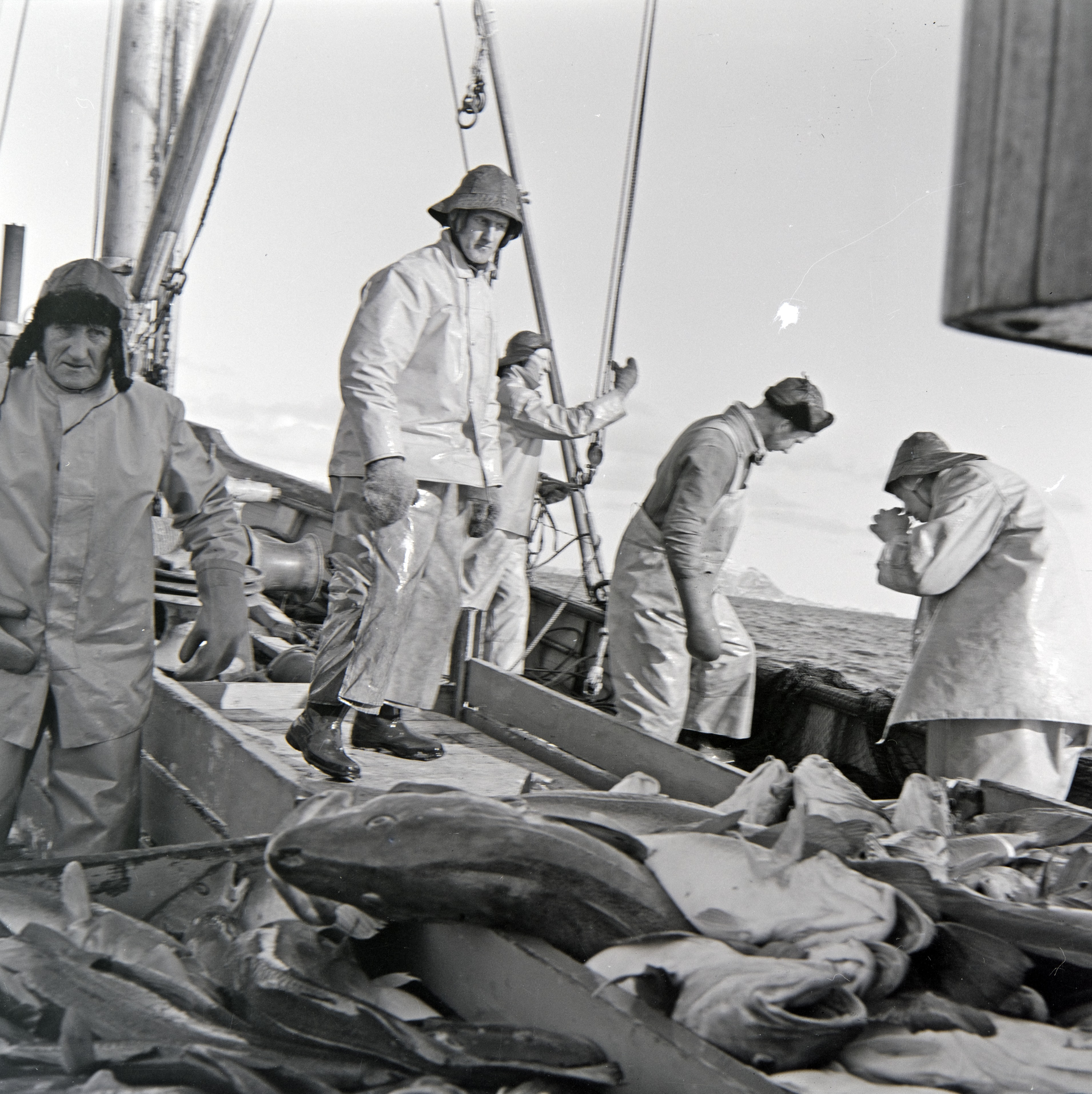
Cod fishery in Norway

The North American east coast developed in part due to the vast amount of cod, and many cities in the New England area spawned near cod fishing grounds. New England profited greatly from the golden trade route between England, Africa, the West Indies, and New England in the 17th and 18th centuries. New England cod went to England and then to the West Indies to feed slaves working in the sugar cane fields producing molasses for rum manufacture in Massachusetts and England to be used as payment for more slaves from West African slave traders to be used in the ever-expanding sugar cane fields in the West Indies.

Between the 1530s and 1626 Basque whalers frequented the waters of Newfoundland and the north shore of the Gulf of St. Lawrence from the Strait of Belle Isle to the mouth of the Saguenay River. They constructed stone ovens ashore for fires to melt whale fat. However, as whales became scarce, the cod fishery off the Grand Banks of Newfoundland became hotly contested by the British and French, in the sixteenth and seventeenth century. The British used small boats close to shore, from which they caught the cod with hook and line. They practiced the "dry fishery" technique, which involved shore-based settlements for the drying of cod on flakes or racks placed in the open air for their subsequent transport back to Europe. The French on the other hand practiced the "green fishery", which involved processing the catch with salt aboard ship. At the same time a fleet of schooners fishing for cod, halibut, haddock, and mackerel became prominent off the Atlantic coast. The use of the long line and purse seine net increased the size of the catch.

Apart from its long history, this particular trade also differs from most other fishing trades by the location of the fishing grounds, far from large populations and without any domestic market. The large cod fisheries along the coast of North Norway (and in particular close to the Lofoten islands) have been developed almost uniquely for export, depending on sea transport of stockfish over large distances. Since the introduction of salt, dried salt cod ('klippfisk' in Norwegian) has also been exported. The trade operations and the sea transport were by the end of the 14th century taken over by the Hanseatic League, Bergen being the most important port of trade. William Pitt the Elder, criticizing the Treaty of Paris in Parliament, claimed that cod was "British gold"; and that it was folly to restore Newfoundland fishing rights to the French.

In the 17th and 18th centuries in the New World, especially in Massachusetts and Newfoundland, cod became a major commodity, forming trade networks and cross-cultural exchanges. In 1733, Britain tried to gain control over trade between New England and the British Caribbean by imposing the Molasses Act, which they believed should have eliminated the trade by making it unprofitable. After Britain began to tax the American settlers, the cod trade grew instead of being eliminated, because the "French were eager to work with the New Englanders in a lucrative contraband arrangement" (p. 95). The American settlers traded cod with the French Caribbean for molasses to make rum at this time, and the increase in trade benefited the American market because of the contraband agreement. In addition to increasing trade, the New England settlers were organized into a "codfish aristocracy". The American settlers rose up against British "tariff on an import, instigated by merchants, including John Hancock and John Rowe, in which the scions of the codfish aristocracy" disguised themselves, boarded their own ships, and disposed of their own goods into the harbor in protest to the tariff, more commonly known as the Boston Tea Party (p. 96).

In the 20th century, Iceland re-emerged as a fishing power and entered the Cod Wars to gain control over the north Atlantic seas. In the late 20th and early 21st centuries, cod fishing off the coasts of Europe and America severely depleted cod stocks there, which has since become a major political issue, as the necessity of restricting catches to allow fish populations to recover has run up against opposition from the fishing industry and politicians reluctant to approve any measures that will result in job losses. Around 1992 the Northern Cod population on the Grand Banks and around Newfoundland collapsed. The 2006 Northwest Atlantic cod quota is set at 23,000 tons, representing half the available stocks, while it is set to 473,000 tons for the Northeast Atlantic cod. The Pacific Cod is currently suffering due to a strong global demand. The 2006 TAC for the Gulf of Alaska and Bering Sea Aleutian Islands was set at 260,000,000 kg (574 million pounds).

=== Fleets ===
Scandinavian shipbuilding technology failed to advance beyond that of the Viking days. The traditional Viking ships performed quite well in the relatively tranquil summer seas of the medieval warm period, but the stormier climates rendered these vessels particularly dangerous to the point of obsolescence. Viking technology spread earlier throughout Europe, and craftsmen along the Atlantic seaboard of western Europe began to develop ships capable of withstanding heavy seas and the gales that struck commonly even during mid-summer. Rarely did a medieval mariner without a death wish dare to venture beyond easy sight of port during the long winter season.

The Hanseatic League promoted trade throughout the Baltic Sea aboard cogs and hulks that mariners propelled with square sails and oars. The pious European population – especially the monasteries, convents, and bishops – demanded enormous quantities of fish, and Dutch, English, other British, Breton and Basque mariners sought suitable fishing grounds. Earlier generations of Europeans frequently fished in Norwegian waters and in the North Sea; however, the cooling climate led to the decline of the former fisheries, and the reduced supply in the latter could not satiate the increasing demand for salted cod, herring, and other fish.

In an era of brief life expectancies and an imploding medieval demography, the risky maritime culture provided a means of subsistence. Most medieval Europeans toiled long hours to produce or earn much less than the equivalent of $2 per person per day, from which they paid tithes, taxes, and rents. To make fishing a viable economic alternative to other means of subsistence, a significant majority of fleets leaving port had to reach the fisheries and return alive and intact.

The cooling climate and increasing storminess, however, led to a sharp increase in the proportion of traditional Norse-style boats that left port never to return. These casualties at sea led shipbuilders to develop a stronger boat that could ply the Dogger Bank and return full of fish with some reliability. Boat builders, especially prominent in Dutch ports and Basque seaside towns, however, prospered as they provided new vessels to budding mariners or to replace those wrecked or lost at sea. These new ships proved adequately seaworthy for the expectations of the era.

Declining fishing stocks and frequent tax evasion led the Hansa cabal to close the fisheries near Bergen off the Norwegian coast in 1410. English fishermen responded by taking their craft to the closed Icelandic colony and trading and fishing there in 1412. Besides several local fishing boats, very few if any ships had visited Iceland in several decades. English ships, however, began to set sail for Iceland early each spring through the frigid gales and freezing spray to trade and fish just as their Danish predecessors did centuries earlier. Each dogger that successfully returned to Britain in the autumn carried roughly 30 tons of fish. Although the Danish masters of Iceland convinced King Henry V of England to forbid the Icelandic cod trade, English fleets continued to visit the otherwise isolated island. The Hanseatic League copied the shipbuilding technologies of their English rivals and began to reassert Scandinavian sovereignty over Iceland. This struggle led to piracy and pillaging on the high seas and ultimately to the development of modern naval warfare. The settlement probably disappeared during the 15th century.

The historical record, however, does reveal a competition between Basque, English, and other fishermen and pirates for the North Atlantic fisheries. Foreigners moved beyond peaceful trade with Iceland, and pirates plundered the utterly defenseless Scandinavian community severely and repeatedly during the late 15th century. Some English fleets began to reach the western North Atlantic Ocean by 1480 and found fish so plentiful that the British port of Bristol prospered immensely from the trade.

== Newfoundland ==
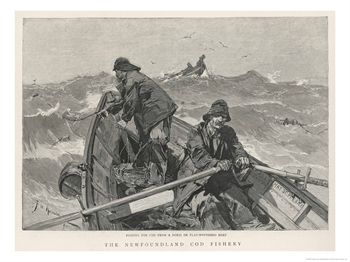
In the 19th century, banks dories were carried aboard larger fishing schooners, and used for handlining cod on the Grand Banks

Cod fishing in Newfoundland was carried out at a subsistence level for centuries, but large-scale fishing began shortly after the European discovery of the North American continent in 1492, with the waters being found to be preternaturally plentiful, and ended after intense overfishing with the collapse of the fisheries in the 1990s.

=== Native Canadian fishing ===
The Beothuk (called Skrælings by the Vikings) were the native people of Newfoundland, and survived on a diet of fish. With British and French coastal settlements, the Beothuk were forced inland, and coupled with the European propensity of murdering them on sight, the lack of their normal food source gradually decreased the Beothuk. By the 19th century, the tribe no longer existed.

=== 15th and 16th century ===
After his voyage in 1497, John Cabot's crew reported that "the sea there is full of fish that can be taken not only with nets but with fishing-baskets." and around 1600 English fishing captains still reported cod shoals "so thick by the shore that we hardly have been able to row a boat through them."

In the early sixteenth century, fishermen from England, France, Spain and Portugal discovered the best places to fish for cod in the waters off Newfoundland, and how best to preserve the fish for the journey home.

The French, Spanish and Portuguese fishermen tended to fish on the Grand Banks and other banks out to sea, where fish were always available. They salted their fish on board ship and it was not dried until brought to Europe. The English fishermen, however, concentrated on fishing inshore where the fish were only to be found at certain times of the year, during their migrations. These fishermen used small boats and returned to shore every day. They developed a system of light salting, washing and drying onshore which became very popular because the fish could remain edible for years. Many of their coastal sites gradually developed into settlements, notably St. John's, now the provincial capital.

In the late sixteenth century the Spanish and Portuguese fisheries were terminated, mainly as a result of the failure of the Spanish Armada, and thereafter the English and French shared the fishery every summer until 1904 when the French agreed to relinquish it to the Newfoundland residents.

== Communities ==
In Newfoundland and Labrador:

- Anchor Point, Newfoundland and Labrador
- Aspen Cove, Newfoundland and Labrador
- Bay de Verde
- Strait of Belle Isle
- Cape Breton Regional Municipality, Nova Scotia
- Cape Island, Newfoundland and Labrador
- Daniel's Cove, Newfoundland and Labrador
- Frederickton, Newfoundland and Labrador
- Gooseberry Cove
- Heart's Content, Newfoundland and Labrador
- Keels, Newfoundland and Labrador
- Lower Island Cove, Newfoundland and Labrador
- Noggin Cove, Newfoundland and Labrador
- Northern Bay Sands
- Port Hope Simpson, Newfoundland and Labrador
- Port Saunders, Newfoundland and Labrador
- Portugal Cove South, Newfoundland and Labrador
- Savage Cove-Sandy Cove, Newfoundland and Labrador
- Swain's Island (Newfoundland and Labrador)
- Paspebiac
- History of Saint Pierre and Miquelon
- Saint Pierre and Miquelon

In England:

- Newton Abbot

In Norway:

- Honningsvåg, Finnmark
- Lofoten, including Svolvær, Henningsvær, and Røst, Nordland
- Nordland
- Senja island (several villages), Troms
- Vesterålen, including Andenes, Sortland and Myre, Nordland
- Vestfjord

== Personalities ==
- Harold Innis
- Samuel Hearne
- Jacques Le Ber
- Joseph Crandall
- Roger Grimes
- Michael Sars
- Charles Robin
- William Coaker
- John N. Cobb
- William Henry Whiteley
- William Shirley
- Roger Curtis
- Carl Walters
- Georg Ossian Sars
- Sir Charles Hamilton, 2nd Baronet, of Marlborough House
- William Coaker

== See also ==
- Cod Wars
- Grand Banks of Newfoundland
- Banks dory
- Cod liver oil
- Sacred Cod
- Eastern freshwater cod
- Harold Innis and the cod fishery
- Diffusion of technology in Canada
- List of harvested aquatic animals by weight
- North Atlantic oscillation
- Pechora Sea
- Economy of Canada
- History of immigration to Canada
- Precautionary principle
- Gazela Primeiro
- Barents Sea
