= Pacific Rim Group =

Singaporean seafood company

- Type: Private
- Industry: Seafood
- Founded: 2013; 13 years ago in Singapore
- Headquarters: Singapore
- Key people: Hosup Rim (CEO)
- Products: Pollock and related products Pacific Herring; Sardine
- Services: Seafood commodity trading and distribution
- Subsidiaries: Pacific Prime Crab
- Website: pacificrim.group

Pacific Rim Group Pte. Ltd. is a multinational seafood trading and distribution company headquartered in Singapore. Its principal activity is the wholesale trade of wild-caught frozen fish and fish products. The company is a member of the Seafood Industries Association Singapore.

== History ==
Pacific Rim Group was founded in Singapore in 2013 as a wholesale distributor of pollock and other seafood products sourced from the North Pacific region.

Since its establishment, the company has expanded its operations through international subsidiaries in China and the European Union. In 2015, Pacific Rim established a subsidiary in China, Qingdao Pacific Rim Seafoods Trade Co., Ltd., based in Qingdao.

In 2016, Pacific Rim renamed its German subsidiary, formerly known as SOCOP Seafood GmbH, to Pacific Rim Germany GmbH, based in Berlin.

In 2019, Soren Dalsager was appointed chief executive officer. In 2020, Dalsager left Pacific Rim Group and Hosup Rim subsequently resumed the role of chief executive officer.

== Operations ==
Pacific Rim Group operates as a seafood commodity trader, sourcing and marketing frozen fish and fish products. Its product portfolio includes pollock, which is MSC-certified, as well as herring, sardines, and related pollock products.
