= Pacific cod =

Pacific cod Temporal range: Pleistocene –recent

Scientific classification
- Kingdom: Animalia
- Phylum: Chordata
- Class: Actinopterygii
- Division: Teleostei
- Order: Gadiformes
- Family: Gadidae
- Genus: Gadus
- Species: G. macrocephalus

Binomial name
- Gadus macrocephalus Tilesius, 1810

Synonyms
- Gadus pygmaeus Pallas, 1814; Gadus ogac Richardson, 1836; Gadus ovak Reinhardt, 1837; Gadus ogat Krøyer, 1847; Gadus auratus Cope, 1873; Gadus brandtii Hilgendorf, 1875

Species of fish

The Pacific cod (Gadus macrocephalus) is a species of ray-finned fish in the family Gadidae. It is a bottom-dwelling fish found in the northern Pacific Ocean, mainly on the continental shelf and upper slopes, to depths of about 900 m (3,000 ft). It can grow to a length of a meter or so and is found in large schools. They feed on clams, worms, crabs, shrimp, and juvenile fish. It is an important commercial food species and is also known as gray cod or grey cod, and grayfish or greyfish. Fishing for this species is regulated with quotas being allotted for hook and line fishing, pots, and bottom trawls. Fossils have been found in Canada near a Steller Sea lion fossil dating to the Pleistocene.

== Description ==
It has three separate dorsal fins, and the catfish-like whiskers on its lower jaw. In appearance, it is similar to the Atlantic cod. A bottom dweller, it is found mainly along the continental shelf and upper slopes with a range around the rim of the North Pacific Ocean, from the Yellow Sea to the Bering Strait, along the Aleutian Islands, and south to about Los Angeles, down to depths of 900 m (3,000 ft; 500 fathoms). It may grow up to 1 m (40 in) in length and weigh up to 15 kg (33 lb). It is found in huge schools.

Molecular genetic analyses strongly suggest that Pacific cod and Greenland cod (Gadus ogac) from Greenland–Arctic Ocean are the same species and that G. ogac should be a junior synonym of G. macrocephalus. Today, ITIS and the Catalogue of Life list Gadus ogac as synonym of G. macrocephalus.

== Fisheries ==
Global capture production of Pacific cod (Gadus macrocephalus) in thousand tonnes from 1950 to 2022, as reported by the FAO

In the Northeast Pacific catches of Pacific cod by the United States trawl fishery and joint-venture fisheries increased from less than 1,000 tonnes in 1979 to nearly 91,000 tonnes in 1984 and reached 430,196 tonnes in 1995. Today, catches are tightly regulated and the Pacific cod quota is split among fisheries that use hook and line gear, pots, and bottom trawls.

== Conservation status ==
The Salish Sea population of Pacific cod is a U.S. National Marine Fisheries Service Species of Concern, one of those species about which the U.S. government's National Oceanic and Atmospheric Administration has some concerns regarding status and threats, but for which insufficient information is available to indicate a need to list the species under the U.S. Endangered Species Act (ESA).

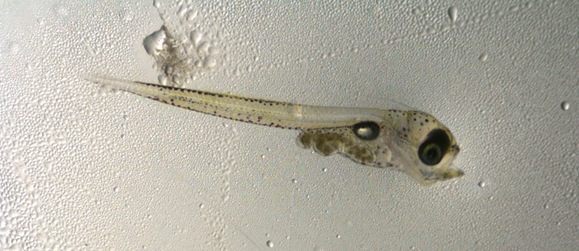
Pacific cod larva

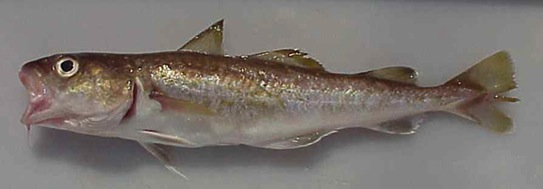
Young Pacific cod

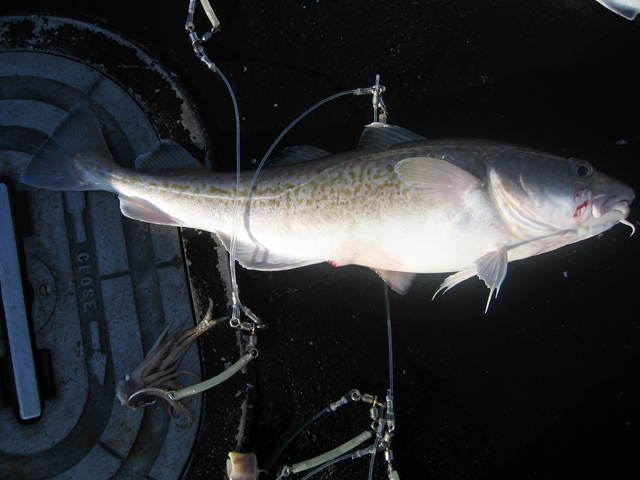
Adult Pacific cod caught on jigging gear

== As food ==
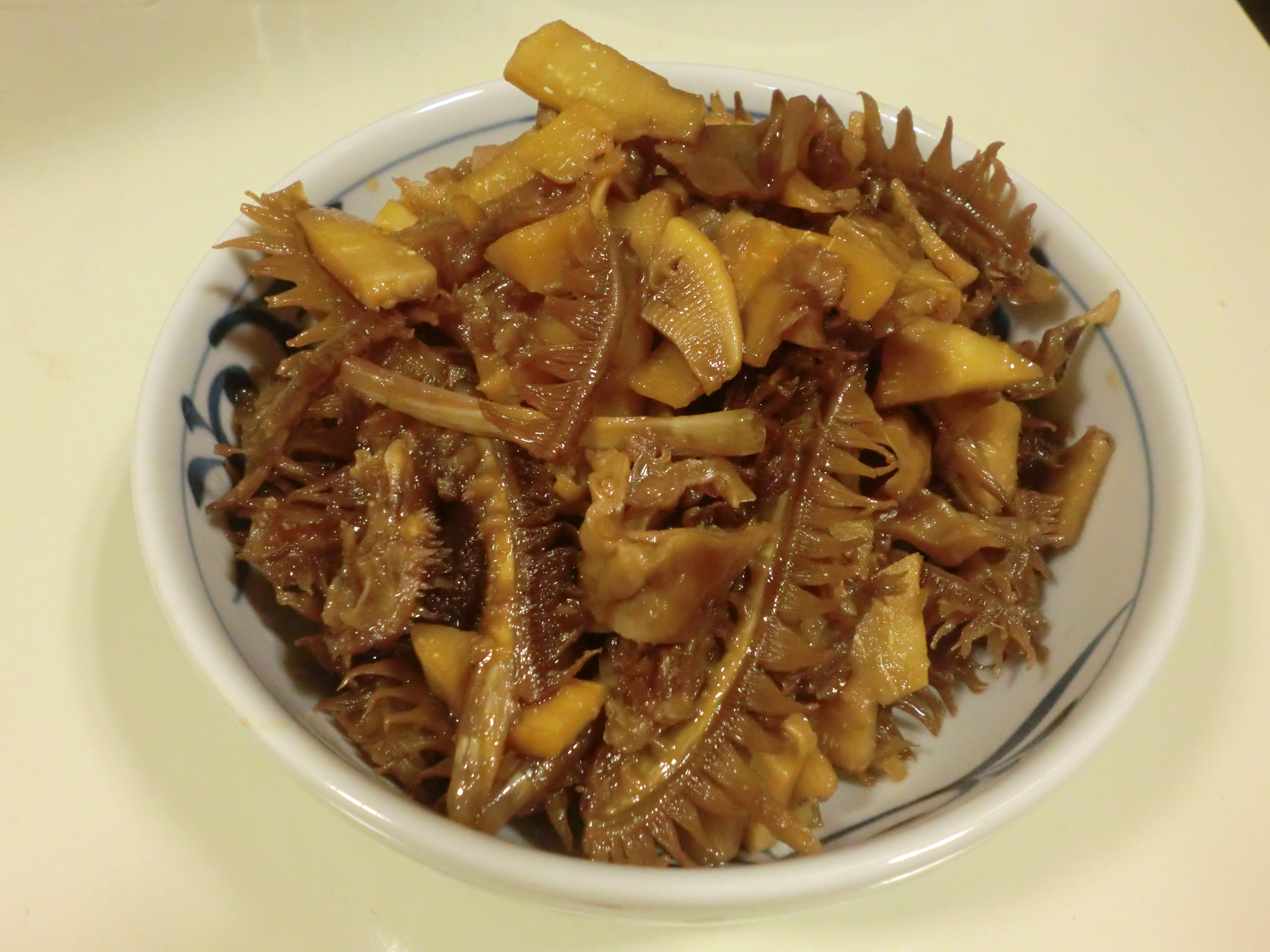
Cod gills eaten during Obon festival

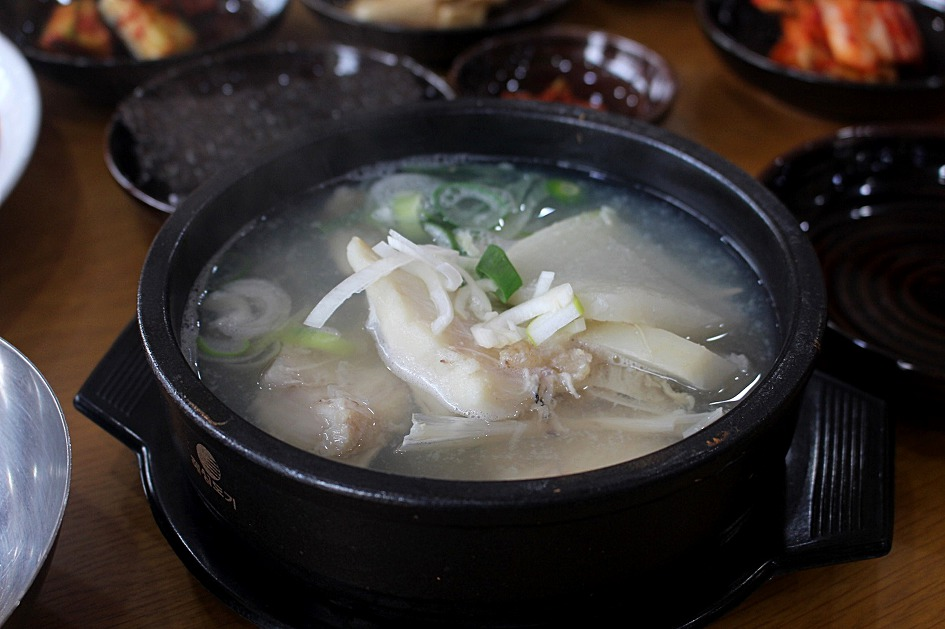
Korean cod soup

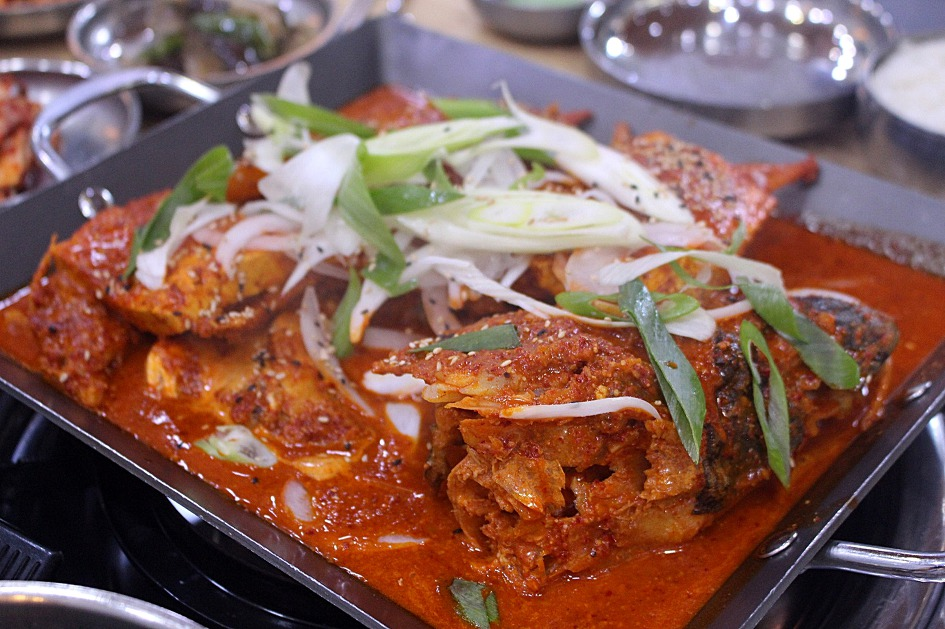
Korean braised cod heads

== See also ==
- Cod
