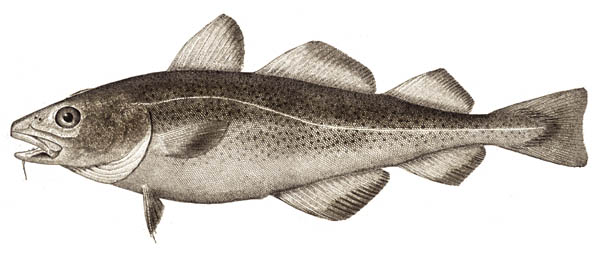
- Gadus morhua, Atlantic cod

Scientific classification
- Kingdom: Animalia
- Phylum: Chordata
- Class: Actinopterygii
- Division: Teleostei
- Order: Gadiformes
- Family: Gadidae
- Genus: Gadus; Linnaeus, 1758

Type species
- Gadus morhua Linnaeas, 1758

Species
- Gadus macrocephalus; Gadus morhua; Gadus chalcogrammus; (Gadus ogac – invalid, synonym to G. macrocephalus)

Synonyms
- Cephus Swainson, 1838; Cerdo Gistel, 1848; Leptogadus Gill, 1863; Morhua Fleming, 1828; Morua Risso, 1827

= Gadus =

Genus of fishes

Gadus is a genus of demersal fish in the family Gadidae, commonly known as cod, although there are additional cod species in other genera. The best known member of the genus is the Atlantic cod.

== Species ==
Today, three species in the genus are recognized:

True cod
Image	Common name	Scientific name	Maximum length	Common length	Maximum weight	Maximum age	Trophic level	Fish Base	FAO	ITIS	IUCN status
	Atlantic cod	Gadus morhua Linnaeus, 1758	200 cm	100 cm	96.0 kg	25 years	4.4				Vulnerable
	Pacific cod	Gadus macrocephalus Tilesius, 1810	119 cm	cm	22.7 kg	18 years	4.0				Not assessed
	Alaska pollock	Gadus chalcogrammus Pallas, 1811	91.0 cm	cm	3.9 kg	28 years	3.5				Not assessed

Modern taxonomy included Alaska pollock (Gadus chalcogrammus), which is genetically not separate from Norway pollock. Greenland cod (G. ogac), once considered its own species, is now considered to be the same species as Pacific cod (G. macrocephalus).
