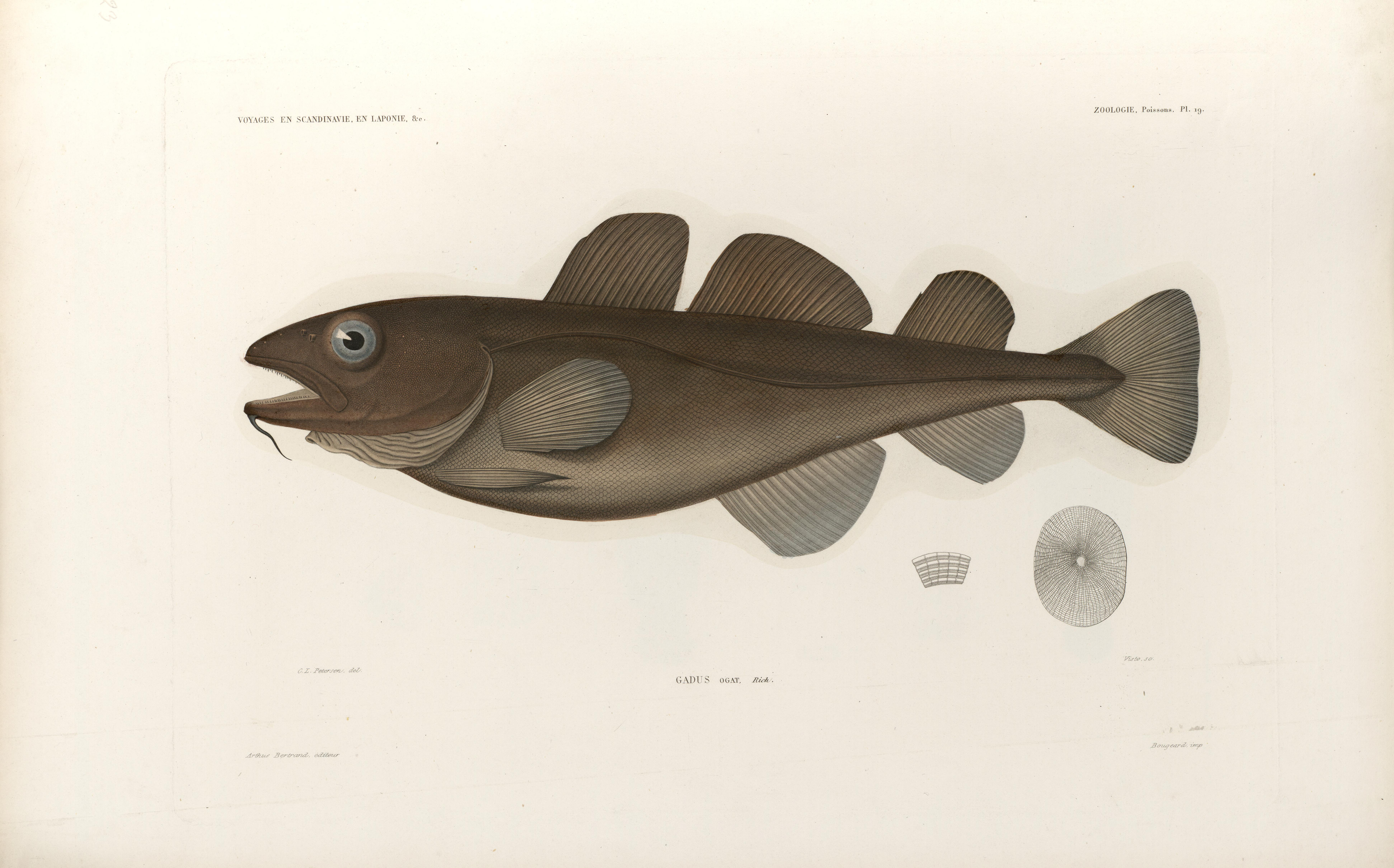

Scientific classification
- Kingdom: Animalia
- Phylum: Chordata
- Class: Actinopterygii
- Order: Gadiformes
- Family: Gadidae
- Genus: Gadus
- Species: G. ogac

Binomial name
- Gadus ogac J. Richardson, 1836

= Greenland cod =

Species of fish

The Greenland cod (Gadus ogac), commonly known also as ogac, is a species of ray-finned fish in the cod family, Gadidae. Genetic analysis has shown that it may be the same species as the Pacific cod (Gadus macrocephalus). It is a bottom-dwelling fish and is found on the continental shelf in the Arctic Ocean and northwestern Atlantic Ocean, its range extending from Alaska to West Greenland, then southwards along the Canadian coast to the Gulf of St. Lawrence and Cape Breton Island. It is a commercially harvested food fish, but landings have been greatly reduced in recent years.

== Taxonomy ==
Molecular genetic analyses strongly suggest that Greenland cod is not different from Pacific cod, Gadus macrocephalus - Gadus ogac is then a junior synonym of G. macrocephalus. ITIS and the Catalogue of Life list Gadus ogac as synonym of G. macrocephalus.

== Description ==
A freshly caught Greenland cod.

In colour the Greenland cod is generally sombre, ranging from tan to brown to silvery. Its appearance is similar to that of other cod species; generally heavy-bodied, elongate, usually with a stout caudal peduncle. They can grow to a length of 77 cm.

They are bottom fishes inhabiting inshore waters and continental shelves, up to depths of 200 m. Their range covers the Arctic Ocean and Northwest Atlantic Ocean from Alaska to West Greenland, then south along the Canadian coast to the Gulf of St. Lawrence and Cape Breton Island generally from 45 to 75 degrees north.

The stock of Greenland cod has been strongly reduced in recent years.

== Fisheries ==
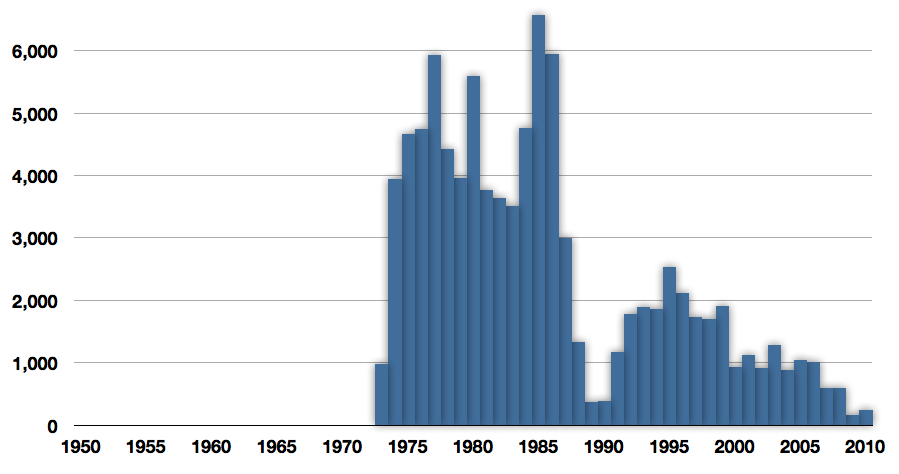
Global capture of Greenland cod in tonnes reported by the FAO, 1950–2010
