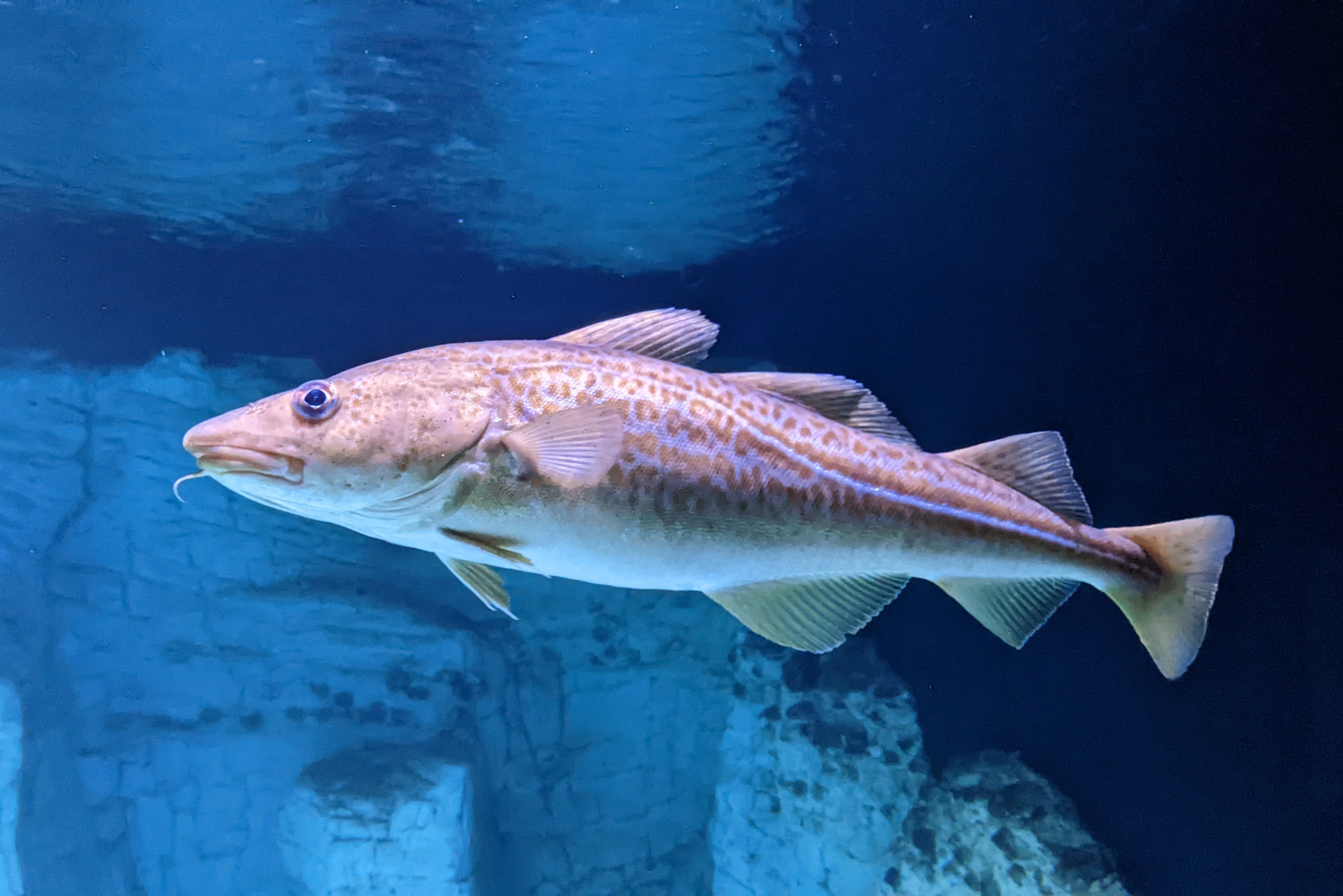

Conservation status
- Vulnerable (IUCN 2.3)

Scientific classification
- Kingdom: Animalia
- Phylum: Chordata
- Class: Actinopterygii
- Division: Teleostei
- Order: Gadiformes
- Family: Gadidae
- Genus: Gadus
- Species: G. morhua

Binomial name
- Gadus morhua Linnaeus, 1758
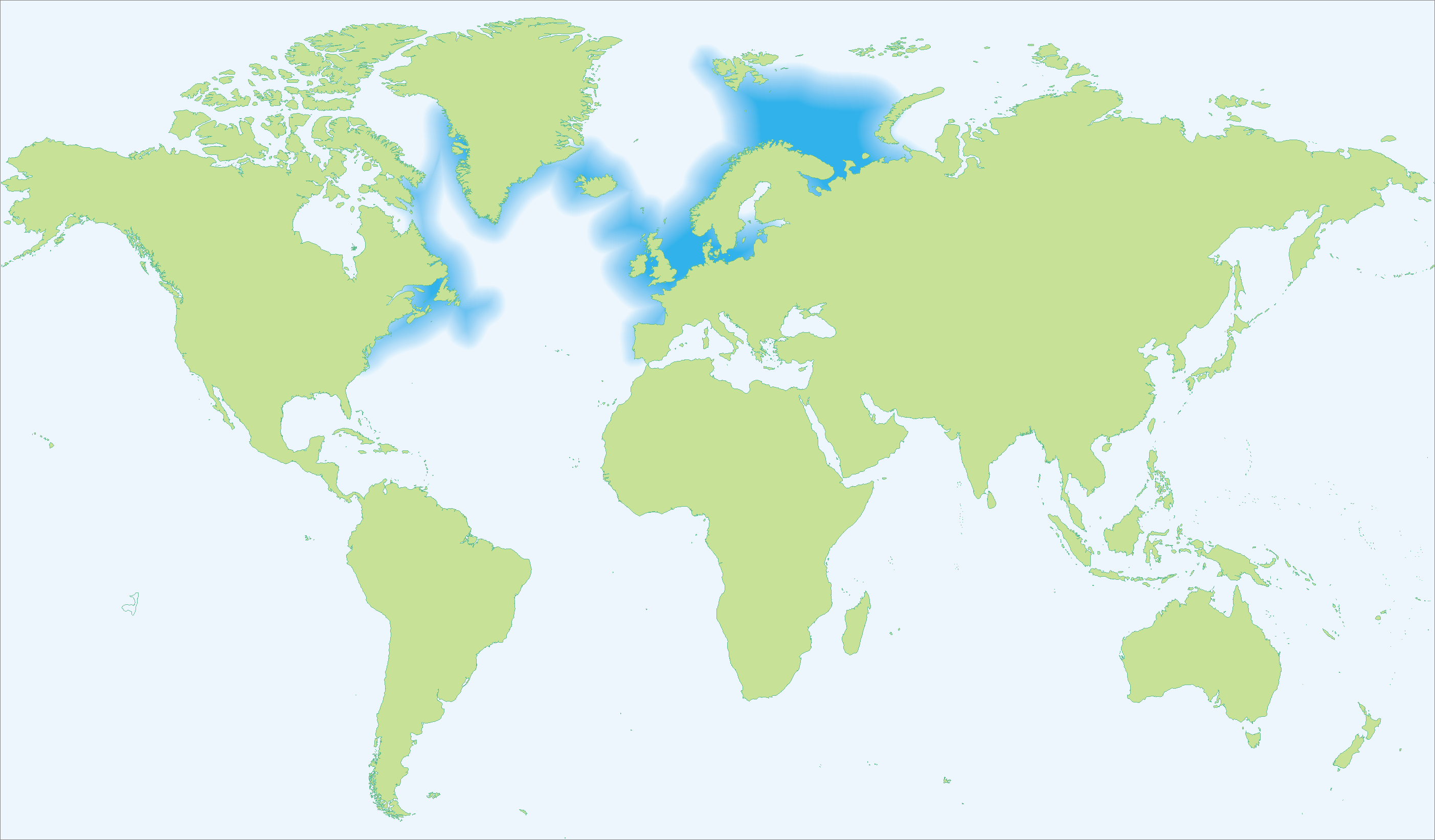
- Distribution of Atlantic cod

Synonyms
- List: Asellus major; Gadus callarias Linnaeus, 1758; Gadus vertagus Walbaum, 1792; Gadus heteroglossus Walbaum, 1792; Gadus ruber Lacépède, 1803; Gadus arenosus Mitchill, 1815; Gadus rupestris Mitchill, 1815; Morhua vulgaris Fleming, 1828; Morhua punctatus Fleming, 1828; Gadus nanus Faber, 1829; Morrhua americana Storer, 1839

= Atlantic cod =

Atlantic cod Temporal range: Pliocene–recent

Species of fish

The Atlantic cod (pl.: cod; Gadus morhua) is a fish of the family Gadidae, widely consumed by humans. It is also commercially known as cod or codling. (Note: During the Middle Ages, Middle English used numerous forms such as mulvel, milvel, melvel, and milwell to refer to fresh, large cod and morhwell to refer to smaller ones. Fresh cod was also known as the common cod, the Scotch cod, and as the green fish or greenfish. "Greenfish", however, now more often refers to other fish. Similarly, "codling" may refer to various morids.)

In the western Atlantic Ocean, cod has a distribution north of Cape Hatteras, North Carolina, and around both coasts of Greenland and the Labrador Sea; in the eastern Atlantic, it is found from the Bay of Biscay north to the Arctic Ocean, including the Baltic Sea, the North Sea, Sea of the Hebrides, areas around Iceland and the Barents Sea.

Atlantic cod can live for up to 25 years and typically grow up to 100–140 cm (40–55 in), but individuals in excess of 180 cm (70 in) and 50 kg (110 lb) have been caught. They will attain sexual maturity between ages 2 and 8, but this varies between populations and has varied over time.

Colouring is brown or green, with spots on the dorsal side, shading to silver ventrally. A stripe along its lateral line (used to detect vibrations) is visible. Its habitat ranges from the coastal shoreline down to 300 m (1,000 ft) along the continental shelf.

Atlantic cod is one of the most heavily fished species. Atlantic cod was fished for a thousand years by north European fishers who followed it across the North Atlantic Ocean to North America. It supported the US and Canadian fishing economy until 1992, when the Canadian Government implemented a ban on fishing cod. Several cod stocks collapsed in the 1990s (decline of more than 95% of maximum historical biomass) and have failed to fully recover even with the cessation of fishing. This absence of the apex predator has led to a trophic cascade in many areas. Many other cod stocks remain at risk. The Atlantic cod is labelled vulnerable on the IUCN Red List of Threatened Species, per a 1996 assessment that the IUCN notes needs updating. A 2013 assessment covering only Europe shows the Atlantic cod has rebound in the continent, and it has been relabelled least concern.

Dry cod may be prepared as unsalted stockfish, and as cured salt cod or clipfish. (Note: Former names for salted cod include cured cod, ling, and haberdine. Freshly-salted cod was known as green cod, white cod, corefish, coursfish, and green fish or greenfish. "Green cod" may also refer to the saithe (Pollachius virens), pollack (P. pollachius), or uncommonly to the lingcod (O. elongatus). "Ling" now more often refers to other fish, particularly the common ling (Molva molva).)

== Taxonomy ==
The Atlantic cod is one of three cod species in the genus Gadus along with Pacific cod and Alaska pollock. A variety of fish species are colloquially known as cod, but they are not all classified within the Gadus, though some are in the Atlantic cod family, Gadidae.

== Behaviour ==
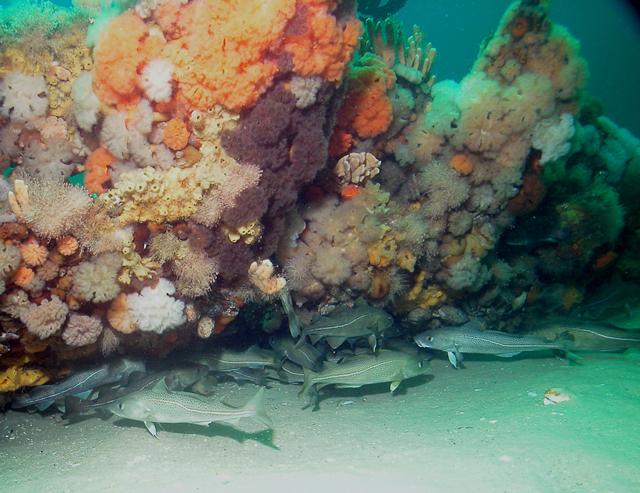
Atlantic cod are demersal fish—they prefer sea bottoms with coarse sediments.

Young Atlantic cod avoid larger cod and pouting (Trisopterus luscus) and crabs on a wreck in the southern North Sea

=== Shoaling ===
Shoaling Atlantic cod on a wreck in the North Sea

Atlantic cod are a shoaling species and move in large, size-structured aggregations. Larger fish act as scouts and lead the shoal's direction, particularly during post spawning migrations inshore for feeding. Cod actively feed during migration and changes in shoal structure occur when food is encountered. Shoals are generally thought to be relatively leaderless, with all fish having equal status and an equal distribution of resources and benefits. However, some studies suggest that leading fish gain certain feeding benefits. One study of a migrating Atlantic cod shoal showed significant variability in feeding habits based on size and position in the shoal. Larger scouts consumed a more variable, higher quantity of food, while trailing fish had less variable diets and consumed less food. Fish distribution throughout the shoal seems to be dictated by fish size, and ultimately, the smaller lagging fish likely benefit from shoaling because they are more successful in feeding in the shoal than they would be if migrating individually, due to social facilitation.

=== Predation ===
Atlantic cod are apex predators in the Baltic and adults are generally free from the concerns of predation. Juvenile cod, however, may serve as prey for adult cod, which sometimes practice cannibalism. Juvenile cod make substrate decisions based on risk of predation. Substrates refer to different feeding and swimming environments. Without apparent risk of predation, juvenile cod demonstrated a preference for finer-grained substrates such as sand and gravel-pebble. However, in the presence of a predator, they preferred to seek safety in the space available between stones of a cobble substrate. Selection of cobble significantly reduces the risk of predation. Without access to cobble, the juvenile cod simply tries to escape a predator by fleeing.

Additionally, juvenile Atlantic cod vary their behaviour according to the foraging behaviour of predators. In the vicinity of a passive predator, cod behaviour changes very little. The juveniles prefer finer-grained substrates and otherwise avoid the safer kelp, steering clear of the predator. In contrast, in the presence of an actively foraging predator, juveniles are highly avoidant and hide in cobble or in kelp if cobble is unavailable.

Heavy fishing of cod in the 1990s and the collapse of American and Canadian cod stocks resulted in trophic cascades. As cod are apex predators, overfishing them removed a significant predatory pressure on other Atlantic fish and crustacean species. Population-limiting effects on several species including American lobsters, crabs, and shrimp from cod predation have decreased significantly, and the abundance of these species and their increasing range serve as evidence of the Atlantic cod's role as a major predator rather than prey.

=== Swimming ===
Atlantic cod have been recorded to swim at speeds of a minimum of 2–5 cm/s (0.039–0.097 kn) and a maximum of 21–54 cm/s (0.41–1.05 kn) with a mean swimming speed of 9–17 cm/s (0.17–0.33 kn). In one hour, cod have been recorded to cover a mean range of 99 to 226 m (325 to 741 ft). Swimming speed was higher during the day than at night. This is reflected in the fact that cod more actively search for food during the day. Cod likely modify their activity pattern according to the length of daylight, thus activity varies with time of year.

=== Response to changing temperatures ===
Swimming and physiological behaviours change in response to fluctuations in water temperature. Respirometry experiments show that heart rates of Atlantic cod change drastically with changes in temperature of only a few degrees. A rise in water temperature causes marked increases in cod swimming activity. Cod typically avoid new temperature conditions, and the temperatures can dictate where they are distributed in water. They prefer to be deeper, in colder water layers during the day, and in shallower, warmer water layers at night. These fine-tuned behavioural changes to water temperature are driven by an effort to maintain homeostasis to preserve energy. This is demonstrated by the fact that a decrease of only 2.5 °C (5 °F) caused a highly costly increase in metabolic rate of 15–30%.

== Feeding and diet ==
The diet of the Atlantic cod consists of fish such as herring, capelin (in the Eastern Atlantic Ocean), and sand eels, as well as squid, mussels, clams, tunicates, comb jellies, brittle stars, sand dollars, sea cucumbers, crustaceans, and polychaetes. Stomach sampling studies have discovered that small Atlantic cod feed primarily on crustaceans, while large Atlantic cod feed primarily on fish. In certain regions, the main food source is decapods with fish as a complementary food item in the diet. Wild Atlantic cod throughout the North Sea depend, to a large extent, on commercial fish species also used in fisheries, such as Atlantic mackerel, haddock, whiting, Atlantic herring, European plaice, and common sole, making fishery manipulation of cod significantly easier. Ultimately, food selection by cod is affected by the food item size relative to their own size. However, providing for size, cod do exhibit food preference and are not simply driven by availability.

Atlantic cod practice some cannibalism. In the southern North Sea, 1–2% (by weight) of stomach contents for cod larger than 10 cm (4 in) consisted of juvenile cod. In the northern North Sea, cannibalism was higher, at 10%. Other reports of cannibalism have estimated as high as 56% of the diet consists of juvenile cod.

When hatched, cod larvae are altricial, entirely dependent on a yolk sac for sustenance until mouth opening at ~24 degree days. The stomach generally develops at around 240 degree days. Before this point the intestine is the main point of food digestion using pancreatic enzymes such as trypsin.

== Reproduction ==
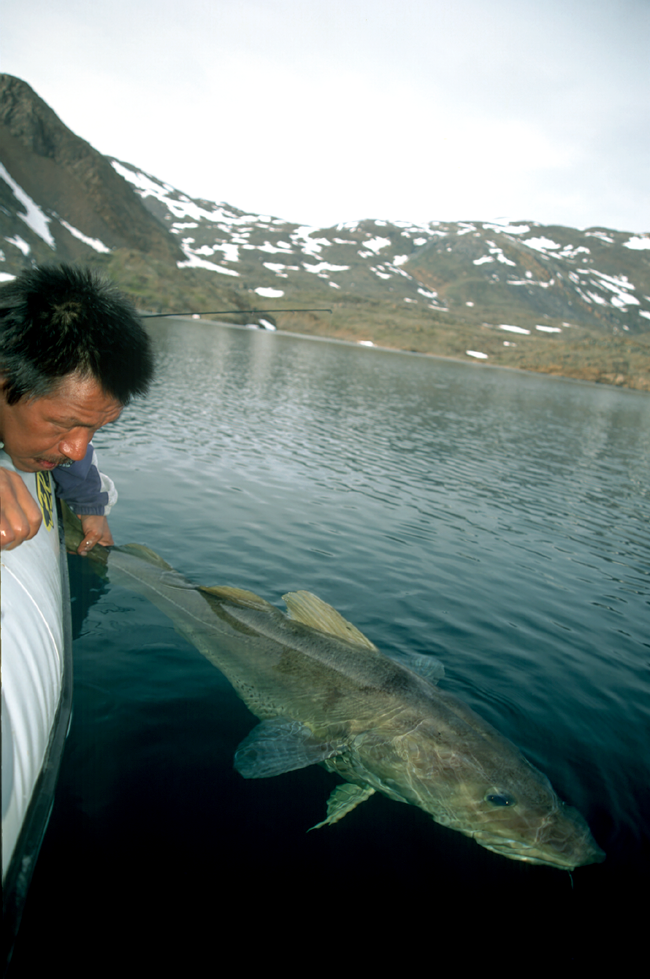
Atlantic cod in a High Arctic lake in Canada. These cod resemble those of past Atlantic catches. Measuring 120–130 cm (47–53 in) long and weighing between 20 and 26 kg (44 and 57 lb), it is easy to see that today's 41–51 cm (16–20 in) commercially caught cod are less than half this size. A cod 2.7 times as long would weigh 20 times as much.

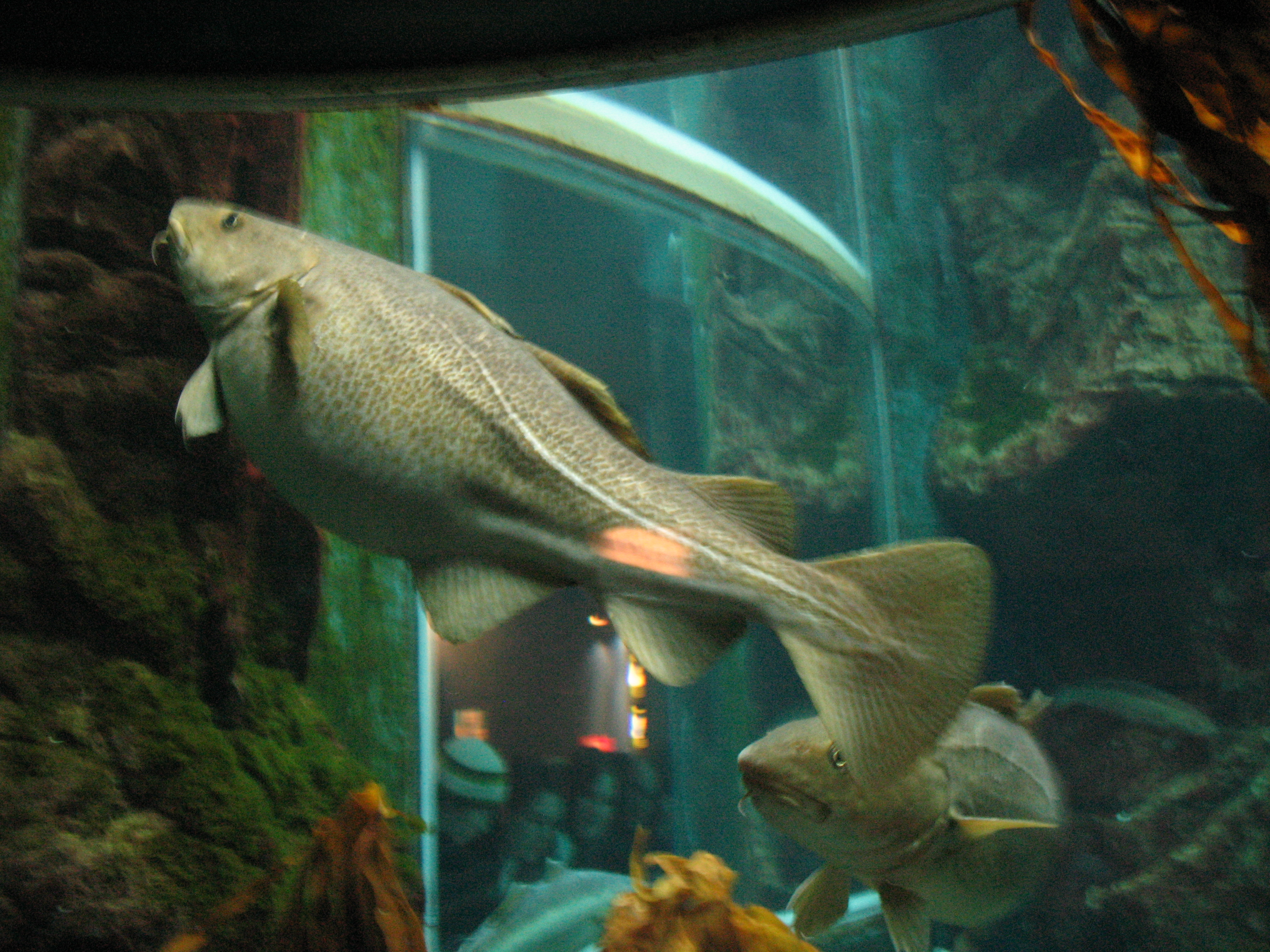
Spawning female in captivity

Juveniles on a wreck in the North Sea

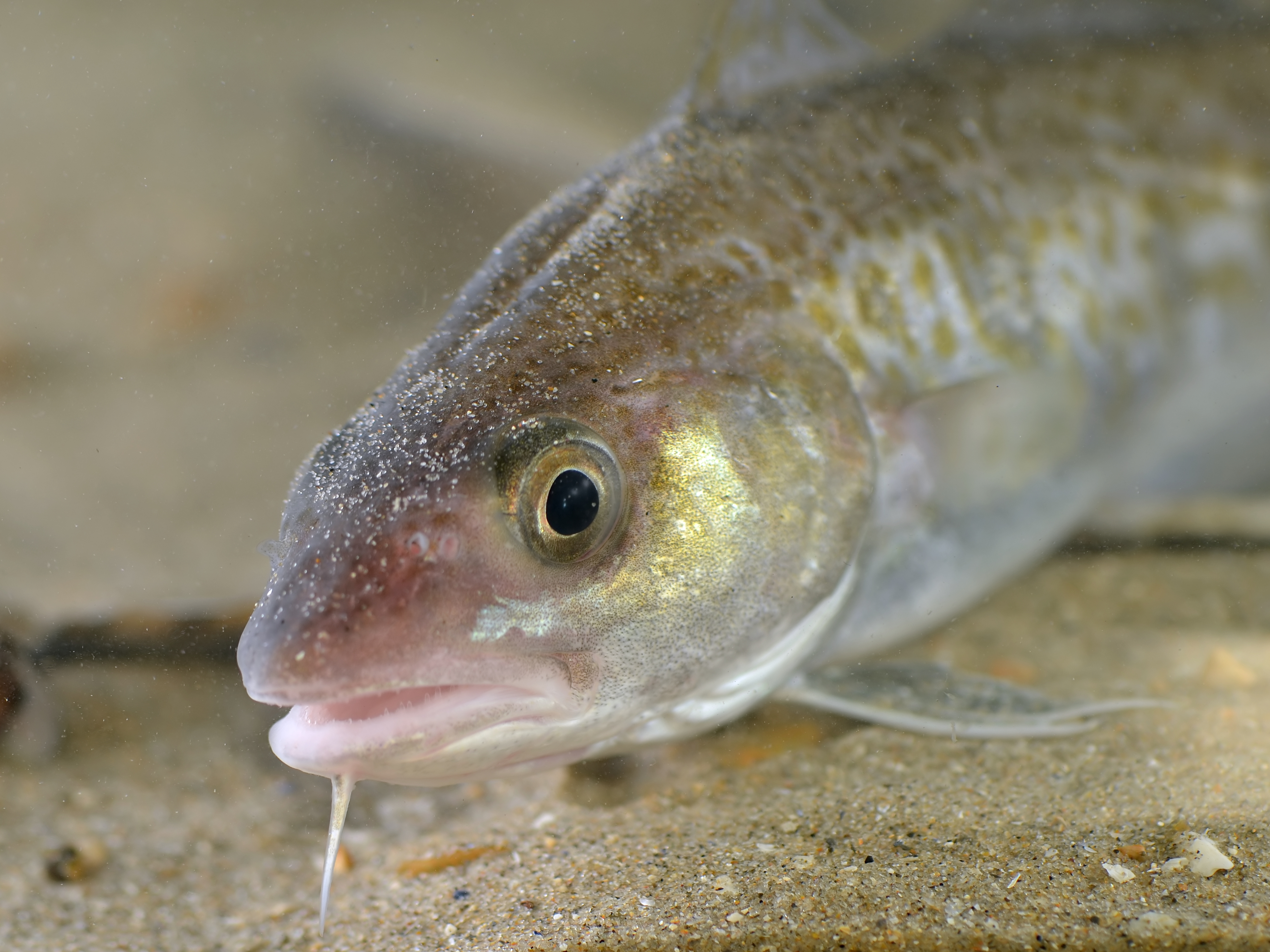
Atlantic cod juvenile

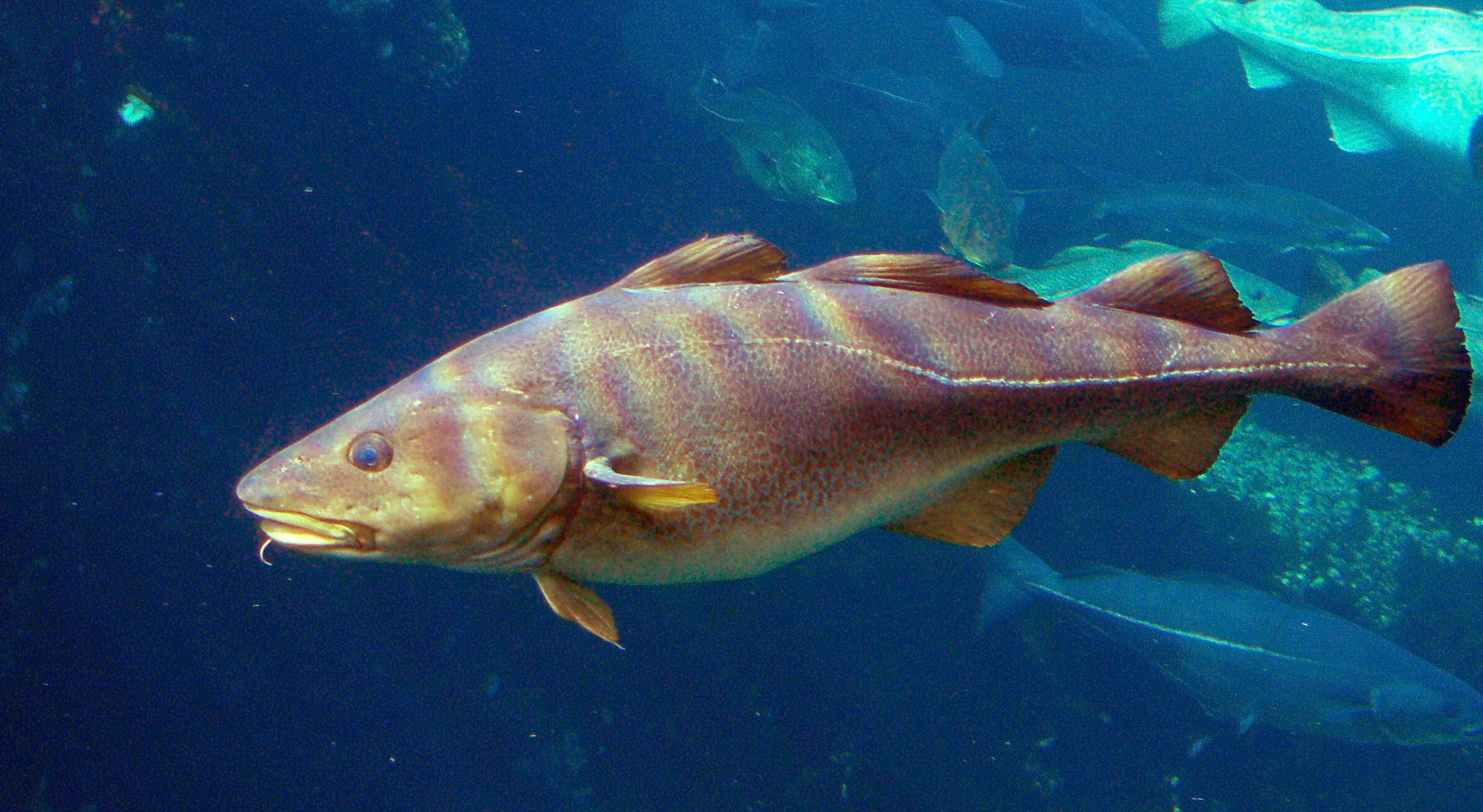
Adult

Atlantic cod will attain sexual maturity between ages 2 and 8, but this varies between different populations and has also varied over time with a population. Their gonads take several months to develop and most populations will spawn from January to May. Many populations have spawning grounds distinct from their feeding grounds, requiring the fish to migrate to spawn. On the spawning area, males and females will form large schools. Based on behavioral observations of cod, the cod mating system has been likened to a lekking system, which is characterized by males aggregating and establishing dominance hierarchies, at which point females may visit and choose a spawning partner based on status and sexual characteristics. Evidence suggests male sound production and other sexually selected characteristics allow female cod to actively choose a spawning partner. Males also exhibit aggressive interactions for access to females.

Atlantic cod are batch spawners, in which females will spawn approximately 5–20 batches of eggs over a period of time with 2–4 days between the release of each batch. Each female will spawn between 2 hundred thousand and 15 million eggs, with larger females spawning more eggs. Females release gametes in a ventral mount, and males then fertilize the released eggs. The eggs and newly hatched larvae float freely in the water and will drift with the current, with some populations relying upon the current to transport the larvae to nursery areas.

== Parasites ==
Atlantic cod act as intermediate, paratenic, or definitive hosts to a large number of parasite species: 107 taxa listed by Hemmingsen and MacKenzie (2001) and seven new records by Perdiguero-Alonso et al. (2008). The predominant groups of cod parasites in the northeast Atlantic were trematodes (19 species) and nematodes (13 species), including larval anisakids, which comprised 58.2% of the total number of individuals. Parasites of Atlantic cod include copepods, digeneans, monogeneans, acanthocephalans, cestodes, nematodes, myxozoans, and protozoans.

== Fisheries ==
Global capture production of Atlantic cod (Gadus morhua) in million tonnes from 1950 to 2022, as reported by the FAO

Atlantic cod has been targeted by humans for food for thousands of years, and with the advent of modern fishing technology in the 1950s there was a rapid rise in landings. Cod is caught using a variety of fishing gears including bottom trawls, demersal longlines, Danish seine, jigging and hand lines. The quantity of cod landed from fisheries has been recorded by many countries from around the 1950s and attempts have been made to reconstruct historical catches going back hundreds of years. ICES and NAFO collects landings data, alongside other data, which is used to assess the status of the population against management objectives. Eastern Atlantic landings frequently exceed 1 million tonnes annually from across 16 populations/management units with landings from the Northeast Atlantic cod population and Iceland accounting for the majority of the landings. Since 1992, when the cod moratorium took effect in Canada, western Atlantic landings have been considerably lower than in the eastern Atlantic, generally being less than 50,000 tonnes annually.

=== Northwest Atlantic cod ===
The Northwest Atlantic cod has been regarded as heavily overfished throughout its range, resulting in a crash in the fishery in the United States and Canada during the early 1990s.

Newfoundland's northern cod fishery can be traced back to the 16th century. On average, about 300,000 t (330,000 short tons) of cod were landed annually until the 1960s, when advances in technology enabled factory trawlers to take larger catches. By 1968, landings for the fish peaked at 800,000 t (880,000 short tons) before a gradual decline set in. With the reopening of the limited cod fisheries in 2006, nearly 2,700 t (3,000 short tons) of cod were hauled in. In 2007, offshore cod stocks were estimated at 1% of what they were in 1977.

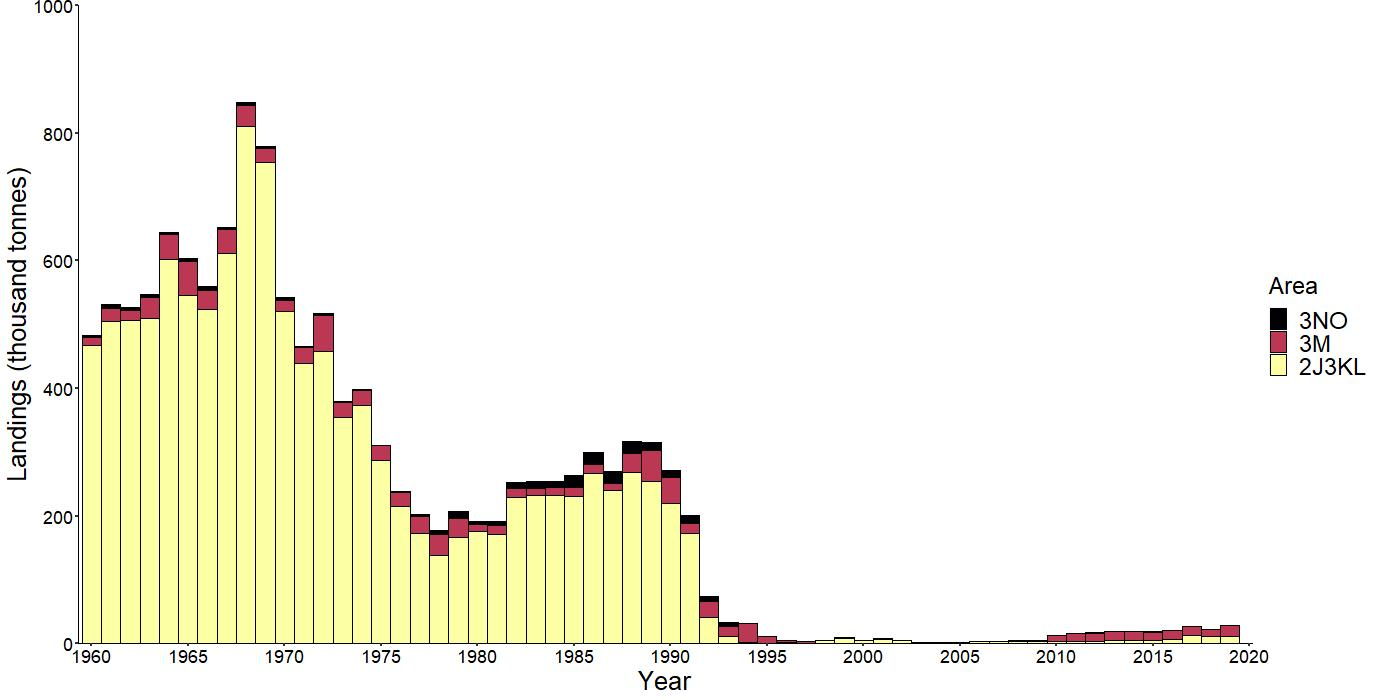
Landings of Atlantic cod (Gadus morhua) in the western Atlantic from 1960 to 2019. Data source: NAFO.

Technologies that contributed to the collapse of Atlantic cod include engine-powered vessels and frozen food compartments aboard ships. Engine-powered vessels had larger nets, greater range, and better navigation. The capacity to catch fish became limitless. In addition, sonar technology gave an edge to detecting and catching fish. Sonar was originally developed during World War II to locate enemy submarines, but was later applied to locating schools of fish. These new technologies, as well as bottom trawlers that destroyed entire ecosystems, contributed to the collapse of Atlantic cod. They were vastly different from old techniques used, such as hand lines and long lines.

The fishery has only recently begun to recover, and may never fully recover because of a possibly stable change in the food chain. Atlantic cod was a top-tier predator, along with haddock, flounder and hake, feeding upon smaller prey, such as herring, capelin, shrimp, and snow crab. With the large predatory fish removed, their prey have had population explosions and have become the top predators, affecting the survival rates of cod eggs and fry.

In the winter of 2011–2012, the cod fishery succeeded in convincing NOAA to postpone for one year the planned 82% reduction in catch limits. Instead, the limit was reduced by 22%. The fishery brought in $15.8 million in 2010, coming second behind Georges Bank haddock among the region's 20 regulated bottom-dwelling groundfish. Data released in 2011 indicated that even closing the fishery would not allow populations to rebound by 2014 to levels required under US federal law. Restrictions on cod effectively limit fishing on other groundfish species with which the cod swim, such as flounder and haddock.

=== Northeast Atlantic cod ===
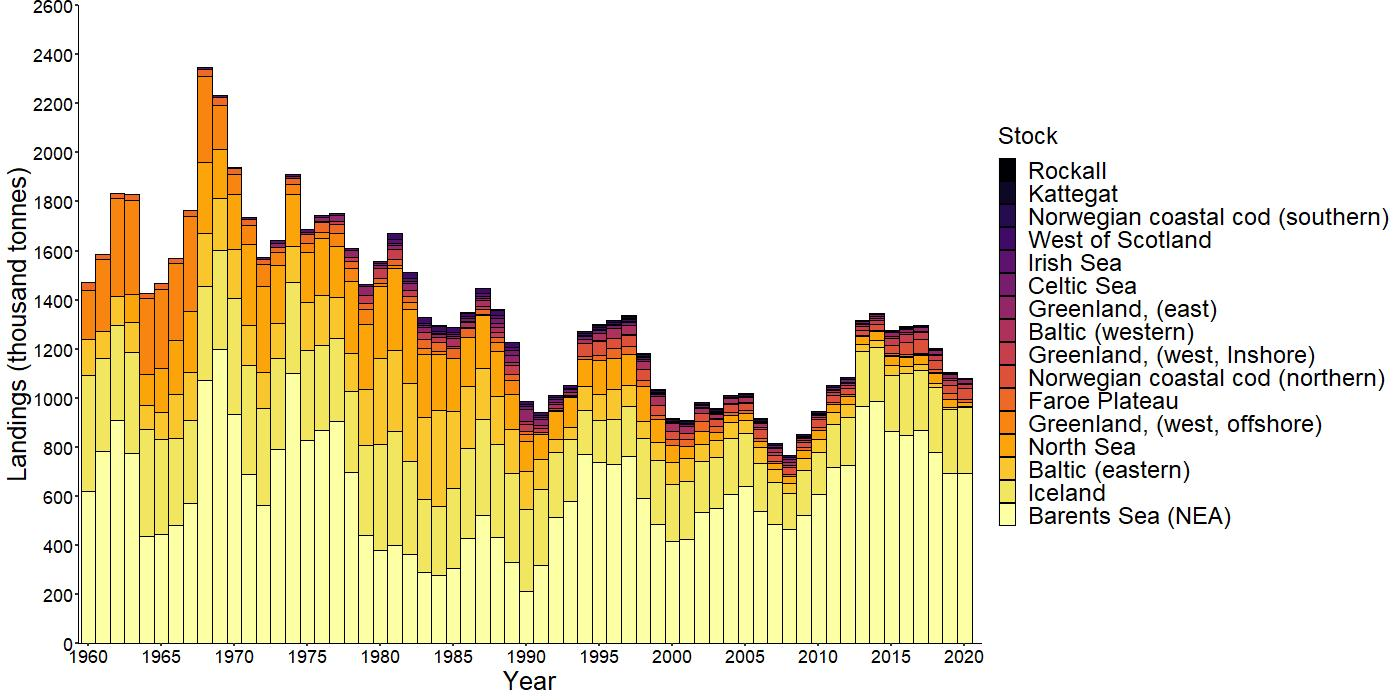
Reported landings of Atlantic cod (Gadus morhua) in the eastern Atlantic for each of the 16 populations/management units. Data source: ICES.

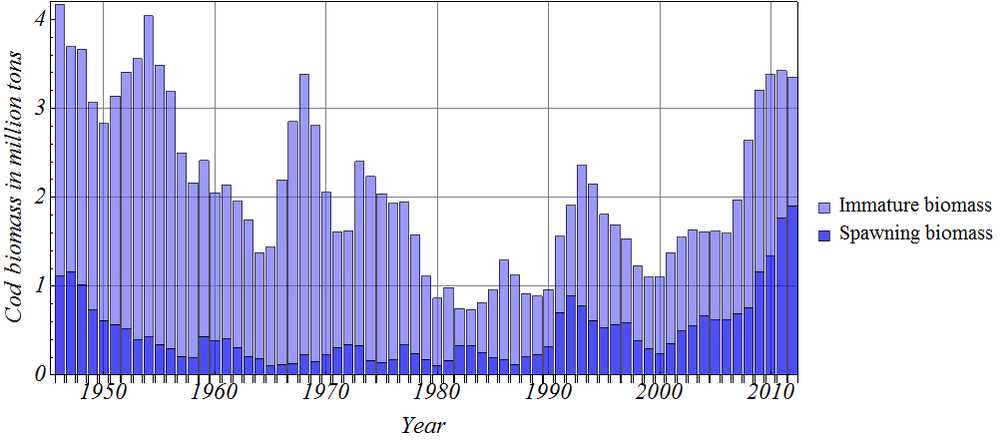
Estimated biomass of the Northeast Arctic cod stock for the period 1946–2012, in million tons: Light blue bars represent the immature fraction of the stock, while the darker blue bars represent the spawning biomass.

The Northeast Atlantic has the world's largest population of cod. By far, the largest part of this population is the Northeast Arctic cod, as it is labelled by the ICES, or the Arcto-Norwegian cod stock, also referred to as skrei, a Norwegian name meaning something like "the wanderer", distinguishing it from coastal cod. The Northeast Arctic cod is found in the Barents Sea area. This stock spawns in March and April along the Norwegian coast, about 40% around the Lofoten archipelago. Newly hatched larvae drift northwards with the coastal current while feeding on larval copepods. By summer, the young cod reach the Barents Sea, where they stay for the rest of their lives, until their spawning migration. As the cod grow, they feed on krill and other small crustaceans and fish. Adult cod primarily feed on fish, such as capelin and herring. The northeast Arctic cod also show cannibalistic behaviour. Estimated stock size was 2,260,000 t (2,490,000 short tons) in 2008.

The North Sea cod stock is primarily fished by European Union member states, the United Kingdom and Norway. In 1999, the catch was divided among Denmark (31%), Scotland (25%), the rest of the United Kingdom (12%), the Netherlands (10%), Belgium, Germany and Norway (17%). In the 1970s, the annual catch rose to between 200,000 and 300,000 t (220,000 and 330,000 short tons). Due to concerns about overfishing, catch quotas were repeatedly reduced in the 1980s and 1990s. In 2003, ICES stated a high risk existed of stock collapse if then current exploitation levels continued, and recommended a moratorium on catching Atlantic cod in the North Sea during 2004. However, agriculture and fisheries ministers from the Council of the European Union endorsed the EU/Norway Agreement and set the total allowable catch at 27,300 t (30,100 short tons). Seafood sustainability guides, such as the Monterey Bay Aquarium's Seafood Watch, often recommend environmentally conscious customers not purchase Atlantic cod.

The stock of Northeast Arctic cod was more than four million tons following World War II, but declined to a historic minimum of 740,000 t (820,000 short tons) in 1983. The catch reached a historic maximum of 1,343,000 t (1,480,000 short tons) in 1956, and bottomed out at 212,000 t (234,000 short tons) in 1990. Since 2000, the spawning stock has increased quite quickly, helped by low fishing pressure. The total catch in 2012 was 754,131 t (831,287 short tons), the major fishers being Norway and Russia.

=== Baltic cod ===
Decades of overfishing in combination with environmental problems, namely little water exchange, low salinity and oxygen-depletion at the sea bottom, caused major threats to the Baltic cod stocks.

There are at least two populations of cod in the Baltic Sea: One large population that spawns east of Bornholm and one population spawning west of Bornholm. Eastern Baltic cod is genetically distinct and adapted to the brackish environment. Adaptations include differences in hemoglobin type, osmoregulatory capacity, egg buoyancy, sperm swimming characteristics and spawning season. The adaptive responses to the environmental conditions in the Baltic Sea may contribute to an effective reproductive barrier, and thus, eastern Baltic cod can be viewed as an example of ongoing speciation. Due to drastically low cod population sizes, commercial fishing of eastern Baltic cod is prohibited since 2019. However, unfavourable environmental conditions in the eastern Baltic Sea, i.e., low salinity and increasing oxygen-depletion at the sea bottom, led to presently only the Bornholm Basin (Southern Baltic Sea) having sufficient conditions for successful reproduction of eastern Baltic cod.

The western Baltic cod consists of one or several small subpopulations that are genetically more similar to the North Sea cod. In the Arkona basin (located off Cape Arkona, Rügen), spawning and migrating cod from both the eastern and western stocks intermingle in proportions that vary seasonally. The immigration of eastern cod into the western Baltic management unit may mask a poor state of the populations in the western management unit.

== See also ==
- Cod War
- Sacred Cod
- Cod as food
- Scrod
