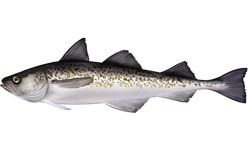

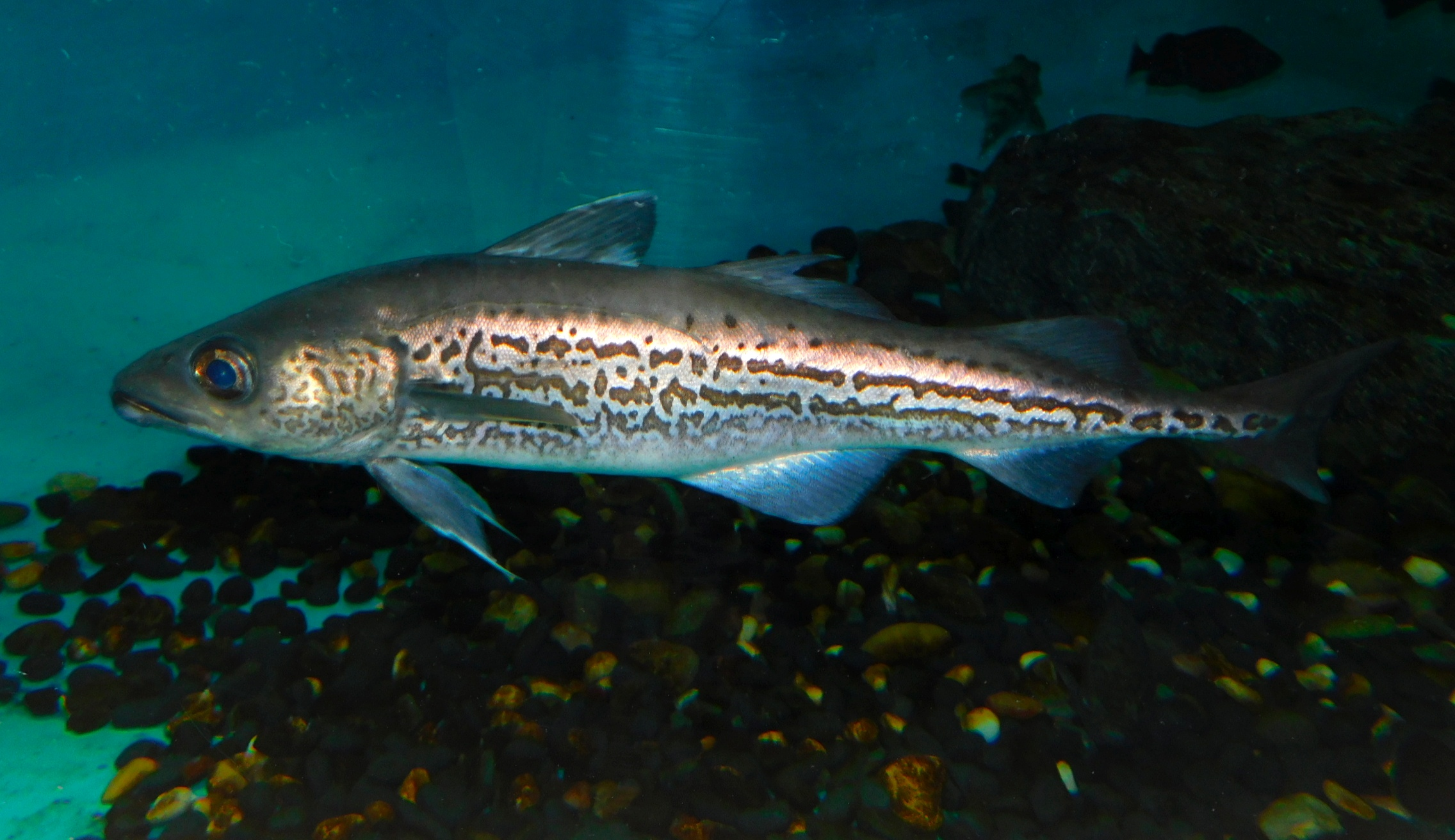
- In the Oarai Aquarium, Japan

Conservation status
- Near Threatened (IUCN 3.1)

Scientific classification
- Kingdom: Animalia
- Phylum: Chordata
- Class: Actinopterygii
- Division: Teleostei
- Order: Gadiformes
- Family: Gadidae
- Genus: Gadus
- Species: G. chalcogrammus

Binomial name
- Gadus chalcogrammus Pallas, 1814

Synonyms
- Pollachius chalcogrammus Pallas, 1814; Theragra chalcogramma Pallas, 1814; Gadus periscopus Cope, 1873; Gadus minor Döderlein, 1887; Theragra fucensis Jordan & Gilbert, 1893; Theragra finnmarchica Koefoed, 1956

= Alaska pollock =

Species of fish

The Alaska pollock also known as Pacific pollock or walleye pollock (Gadus chalcogrammus) is a marine fish species of the cod genus Gadus and family Gadidae.

It is a semi-pelagic schooling fish widely distributed in the North Pacific, with largest concentrations found in the eastern Bering Sea.

== Name and differentiation ==
Alaska pollock was in 1956 put in its own genus, Theragra, and classified as Theragra chalcogramma, but research in 2008 has shown it is rather closely related to the Atlantic cod and should therefore be moved back to Gadus, where it was originally placed. In 2014, the U.S. Food and Drug Administration announced that the official scientific name for the fish was changed from Theragra chalcogramma back to its original taxon Gadus chalcogrammus, highlighting its close genetic relationship to the other species of the cod genus Gadus. Since 2014, registries of scientific names for fish species (e.g. the United Nations' ASFIS list and the World Registry of Marine Species (WoRMS) have largely adopted the Gadus chalcogrammus name.

The change of the official scientific name was followed by a discussion to change the common name as well, to highlight the fish as a member of the cod genus. The common names "Alaska pollock" "pacific pollock" and "walleye pollock", are all used as trade names internationally, are considered misleading by scientific and trade experts, as the names do not reflect the scientific classification. While belonging to the same family as the Atlantic pollock, the Alaska pollock is not a member of the genus Pollachius, but of the cod genus Gadus. Nevertheless, alternative trade names highlighting its placement in the cod genus, such as "snow cod", "bigeye cod", or direct deductions from the scientific names such as "copperline cod" (gadus meaning 'cod', Latin: chalco- from Greek: khalkós meaning 'copper', and Greek: grammí meaning 'line') or "lesser cod" (from the synonymous taxon Gadus minor) have yet to find widespread acceptance. The National Oceanic and Atmospheric Administration even states that "[the common name] might never change, as common names are separate from scientific names".

In addition, Norwegian pollock (Theragra finnmarchica), a rare fish of Norwegian waters, is likely the same species as the Alaska pollock.

== Ecology ==
The speckled coloring of Alaska pollock makes it more difficult for predators to see them when they are near sandy ocean floors. They are a relatively fast-growing and short-lived species, currently representing a major biological component of the Bering Sea ecosystem. It has been found that catches of Alaska pollock go up three years after stormy summers. The storms stir up nutrients, and this results in phytoplankton being plentiful for longer, which in turn allows more pollock hatchlings to survive. The Alaska pollock has well-developed drumming muscles that the fish use to produce sounds during courtship, like many other gadids.

=== Foraging behavior ===
The primary factor in determining the foraging behavior of the Alaskan pollock is age. Young pollocks can be divided into two sub-groups, fish with lengths below 60 mm (2 1/2 in) and fish greater than 60 mm. Both groups mainly feed on copepods. However, the latter group will also forage for krill. Therefore, food depletion has a larger effect on smaller pollock.

The variation in size of each subgroup also affects seasonal foraging behavior. During the winter, when food is scarce, foraging can be costly due to the fact that longer hunting time increases the risk of meeting a predator. The larger young pollocks have no need to hunt during the winter because they have a higher capacity for energy storage, while smaller fish do not, and have to continue foraging, putting them at greater risk. To maximize their chances of survival, large pollock increase their calorie intake in autumn to gain weight, while smaller ones focus solely on growing in size.

Alaskan pollock exhibit diel vertical migration, following the seasonal movement of their food. Although pollocks exhibit vertical movement during the day, their average depth changes with the seasons. Originally, the change in depth was attributed to the amount of light or water temperature, but in fact, it follows the movement of food species. In August, when food is abundantly available near the surface, pollocks will be found at shallower depths. In November, they are found deeper along with their planktonic food source.

== Distribution ==
=== Alaska pollock in the Pacific Ocean ===
The Alaska pollock's main habitats are the coastal areas of the Northern Pacific, especially the waters off Alaska (Eastern Bering Sea, Gulf of Alaska, Aleutian Islands) as well as off Russia, Japan and Korea (Western Bering Sea and Sea of Okhotsk). The largest concentrations of Alaska pollock are found in the eastern Bering Sea.

=== Small populations in the Arctic Ocean (Barents Sea) ===
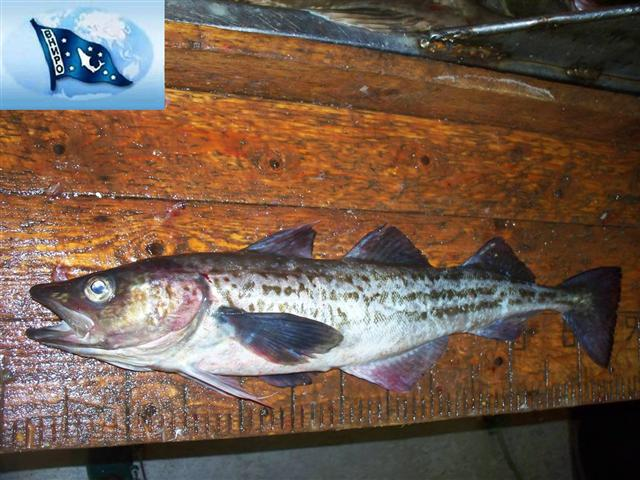
Fish from the Barents Sea that was initially described as own species Theragra finnmarchica (Norway pollock), but is now known to be genetically identical to Gadus chalcogrammus (Alaska pollock).

Very small populations of fish genetically identical to Gadus chalcogrammus are found in the Barents Sea waters of northern Norway and Russia. This fish was initially described as its own species under the taxon Theragra finnmarchica by Norwegian zoologist Einar Koefoed in 1956. The common name used for the fish was "Norway pollock". Genetic analyses have shown that the fish is genetically identical to the Alaska pollock. It is therefore considered to be conspecific with the Pacific species and is attributed to Gadus chalcogrammus. The history of the species in the Barents Sea is unknown.

The initial specification as an own species by Koefoed was based on two specimens landed in Berlevåg, northern Norway, in 1932 (hence the Norwegian name, Berlevågfisk). Based on morphological differences, Koefoed considered Theragra finnmarchica a new species, related to but separate from the Alaska pollock. Just seven specimens of the fish are known to have been caught between 1957 and early 2002 in the Arctic Ocean. In 2003 and 2004, 31 new specimens were caught. All specimens were large (465–687 mm (18 1/4–27 in) in total length) and caught in the coastal waters between Vesterålen in the west and Varangerfjord in the east. By 2006, 54 individuals had been recorded. Sequencing of mitochondrial DNA of two specimens of Theragra finnmarchica and 10 Theragra chalcogramma (today: Gadus chalcogrammus) revealed no significant genetic differences, leading Ursvik et al. to suggest that T. finnmarchica and T. chalcogramma are the same species. An analysis of a much larger sample size (44 T. finnmarchica and 20 T. chalcogramma) using both genetic and morphological methods led to similar conclusions. While the putative species could not be separated genetically, they showed some consistent differences in morphology. Only one characteristic showed no overlap. Byrkjedal et al. conclude that T. finnmarchica should be considered a junior synonym of T. chalcogramma. These analyses also suggest that T. finnmarchica is a near relative of the Atlantic cod, and that both Alaska and Norway pollock should be moved to genus Gadus.

Norway pollock (Theragra finnmarchica) was listed as Near Threatened in the 2010 Norwegian Red List for Species based on criteria D1: "Very small or geographically very restricted population: Number of mature individuals". The IUCN Red List currently lists Alaskan pollock as Near Threatened in Europe.

== Fisheries ==
Global capture production of Alaska pollock (Gadus chalcogrammus) in million tonnes from 1950 to 2022, as reported by the FAO

The Alaska pollock has been said to be "the largest remaining source of palatable fish in the world". Around 3 million metric tons (3,000,000 long tons; 3,300,000 short tons) of Alaska pollock are caught each year in the North Pacific, from Alaska to northern Japan. Alaska pollock is the world's second most important fish species, after the Peruvian anchoveta, in terms of total catch.

Alaska pollock landings are the largest of any single fish species in the U.S., with the average annual Eastern Bering Sea catch between 1979 and 2022 being 1.26 million metric tons. Alaska pollock catches from U.S. fisheries have been relatively consistent at approximately 1.3 million tons a year, on average 92 percent from the Bering Sea and 8 percent from the Gulf of Alaska. Each year's quota is adjusted based on stock assessments conducted by the Alaska Fisheries Science Center to prevent overfishing. For example, quotas were reduced from 2008 to 2010 in the Bering Sea due to stock declines.

Independent certification groups have hailed the fishery as an example of good management. For example, the Gulf of Alaska and Bering Sea/Aleutian Islands fisheries were separately certified as "sustainable" by the Marine Stewardship Council (MSC) in 2005, and were certified in 2010 and 2016. The fisheries received a combined re-certification in 2020. The Marine Conservation Society rates Alaska pollock harvested from the Gulf of Alaska, Bering Sea, and Aleutian Islands as sustainable, but not those from the Western Bering Sea in Russian waters.

In 2021, the MSC awarded the U.S. trade associations Association of Genuine Alaska Pollock Producers (GAPP) and At-Sea Processors Association with its Ocean Champion Award that recognizes organizations for meeting MSC's commitment to a healthier ocean and a more transparent supply chain. The MSC recognized Alaska pollock from U.S. fisheries as one of the "healthiest" and "most sustainable sources" of protein.

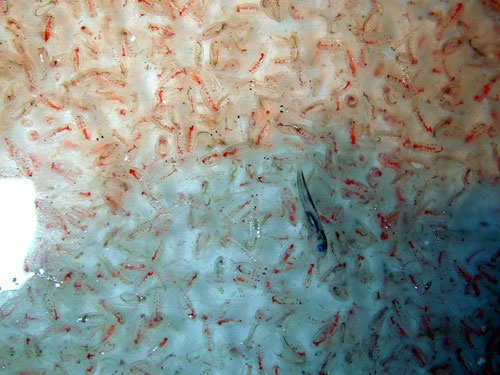
Pollock larvae

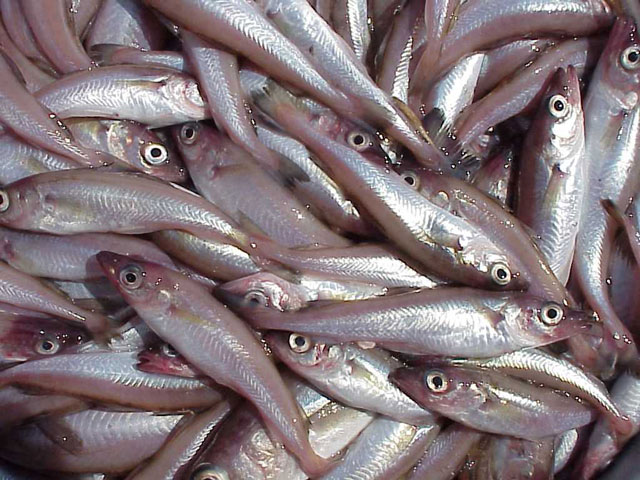
Juvenile pollock

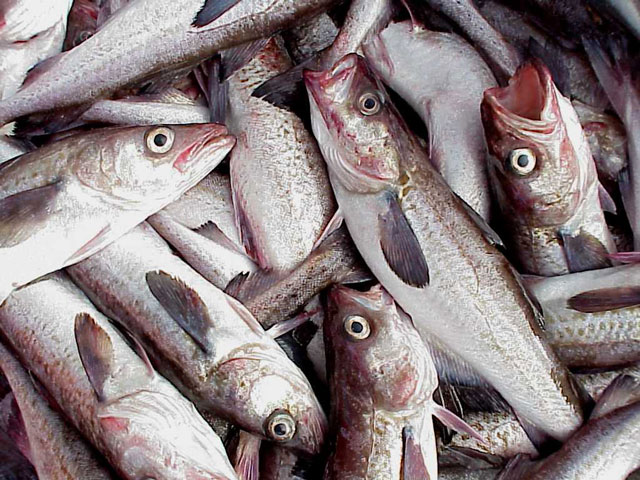
Adult pollock

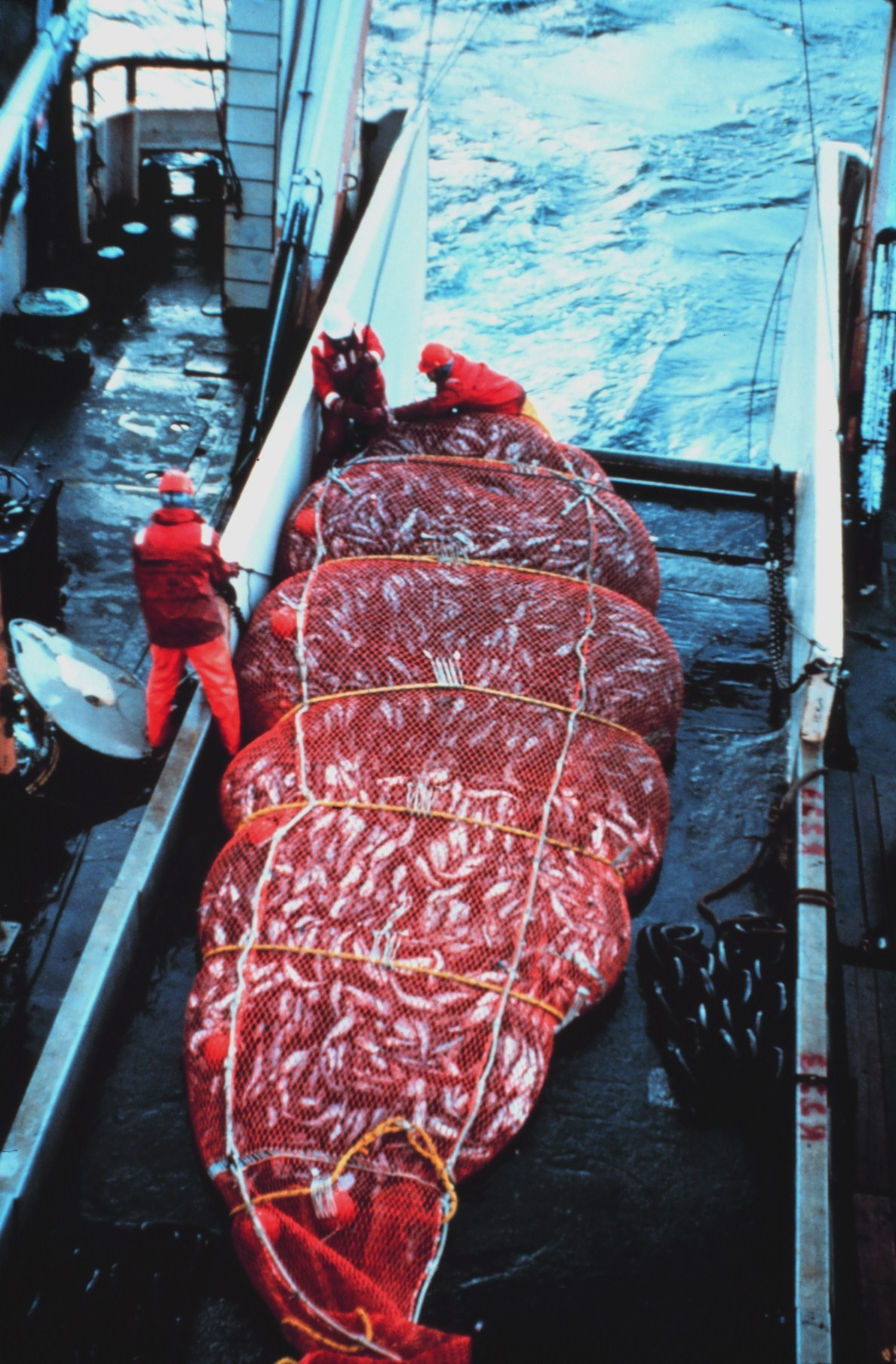
8 short tons (7.3 t)

== As food ==
Compared to other cod species and pollock, Alaska pollock has a milder taste, whiter color and lower oil content.

=== Fillets ===
High-quality, single-frozen whole Alaska pollock fillets may be layered into a block mold and deep-frozen to produce fish blocks that are used throughout Europe and North America as the raw material for high-quality breaded and battered fish products. Lower-quality, double-frozen fillets or minced trim pieces may also be frozen in block forms and used as raw material for lower-quality, low-cost breaded and battered fish sticks and portions.

Alaska pollock is commonly used in the fast food industry in products such as McDonald's Filet-O-Fish sandwich, Burger King Big Fish Sandwich, Wendy's Crispy Panko Fish Sandwich, Arby's King's Hawaiian Fish Deluxe, Arby's Crispy Fish Sandwich, Arby's Spicy Fish Sandwich, Long John Silver's Baja Fish Taco, Bojangles Bojangular, Birds Eye's Fish Fingers in Crispy Batter, 7-Eleven's Fish Bites, White Castle's Panko Breaded Fish Sliders, and Captain D's Seafood Kitchen. Some of these items are seasonal offerings during Lent, when seafood demand is higher.

=== Surimi ===
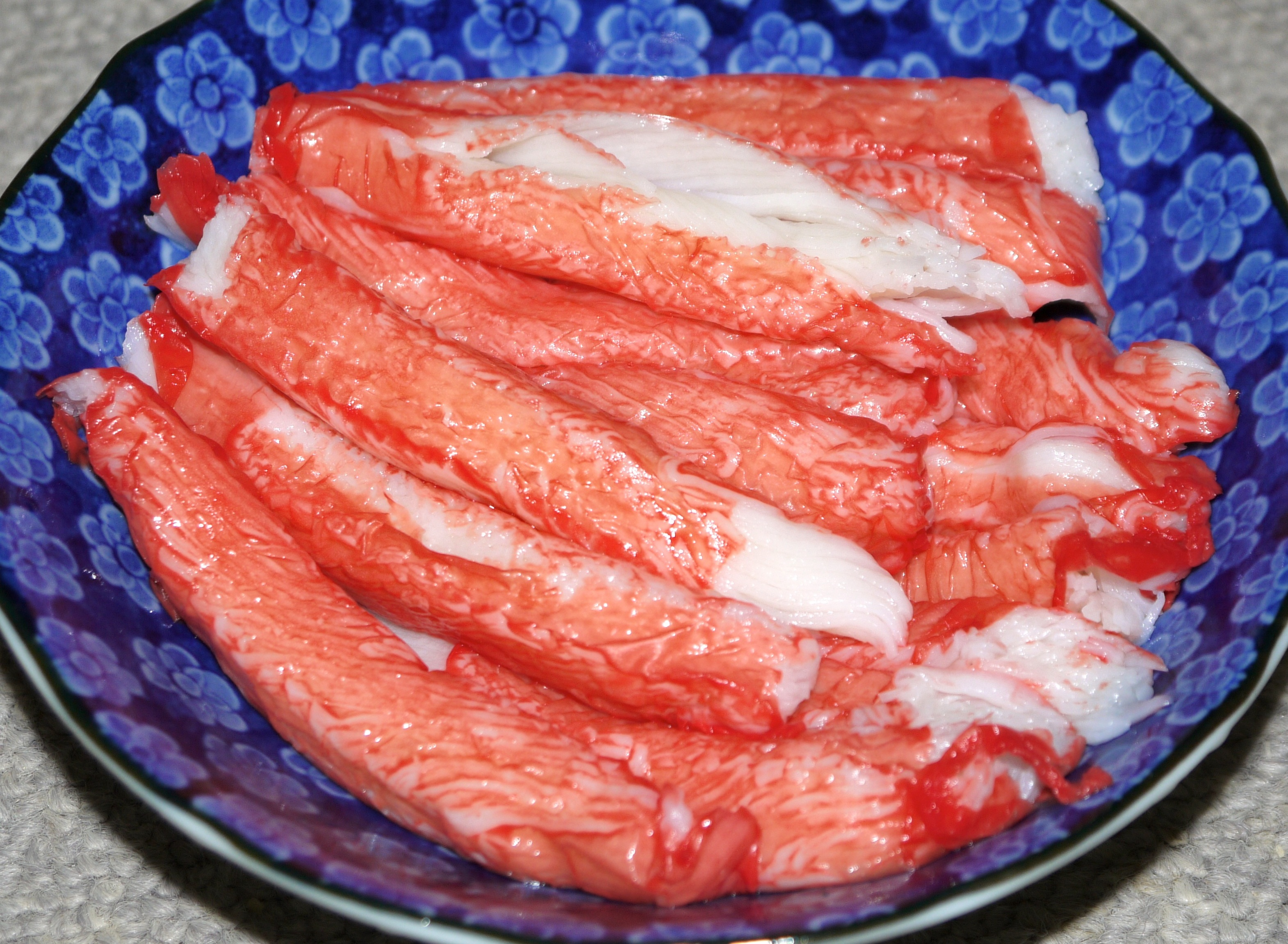
Imitation crab meat is often made from pulverized Alaska pollock

Single-frozen Alaska pollock is considered to be the premier raw material for surimi. The most common use of surimi in the United States is "imitation crabmeat", though it is often seen labeled in retailers and grocers as "surimi seafood" sticks, flakes, or chunks. There are five main forms of surimi seafood: chunk, leg, flake, salad, and shred.

=== Pollock roe ===
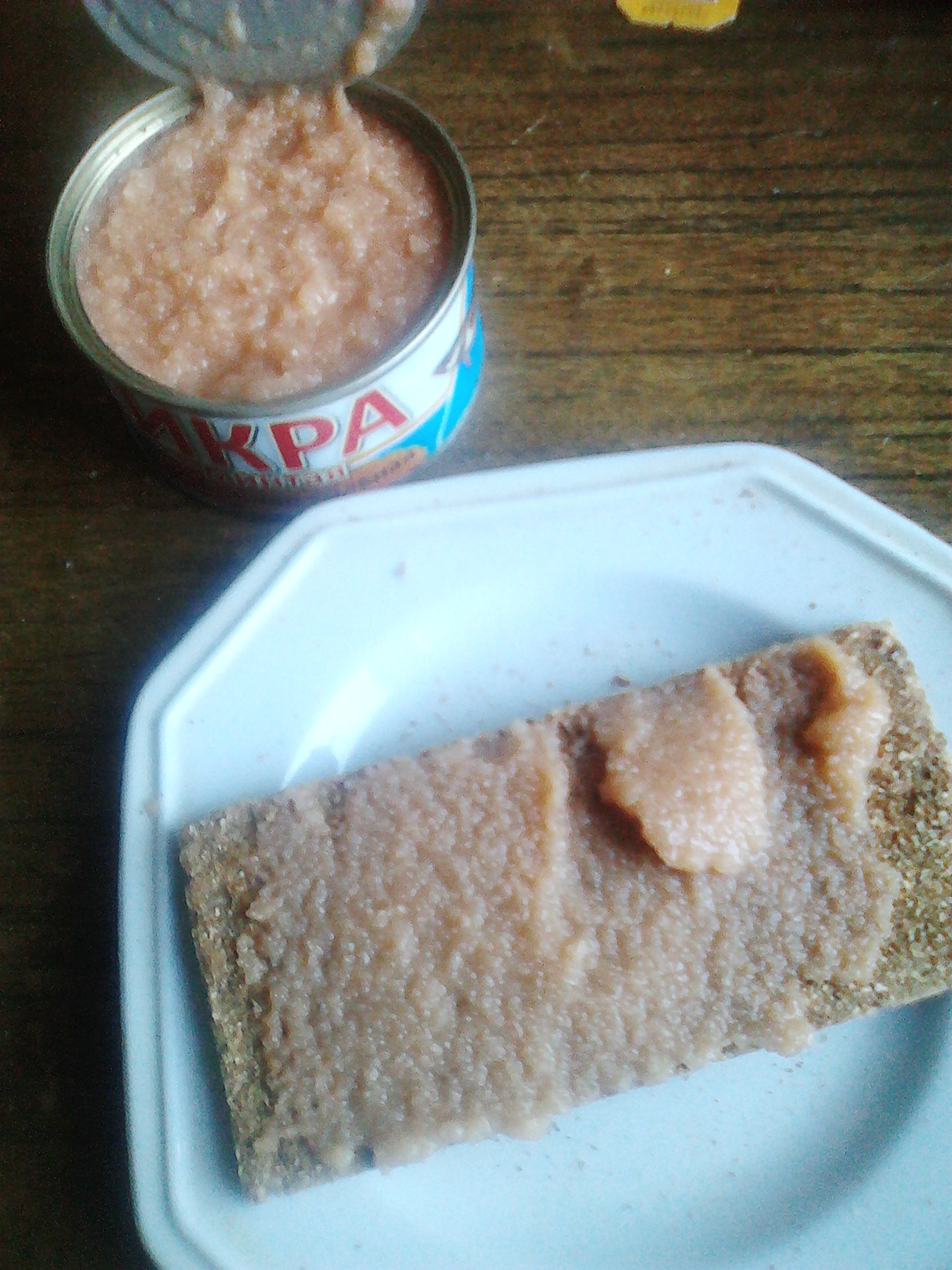
Canned Alaska pollock roe, served on rye cracker (Russia)

Pollock roe is a popular culinary ingredient in Korea, Japan, and Russia. In Korea, the roe is called myeongnan (명란, literally 'Alaska pollock's roe'), and the salted roe is called myeongnan-jeot (명란젓, literally 'pollock roe jeotgal'). The food was introduced to Japan after World War II, and since has been called mentai-ko (明太子) in Japanese. A milder, less spicy version is usually called tarako (鱈子, literally 'cod's roe'), which is also the Japanese name for pollock roe itself. In Russia, pollock roe is consumed as a sandwich spread. The product, resembling liquid paste due to the small size of eggs and oil added, is sold canned.

=== Use as food in Korea ===
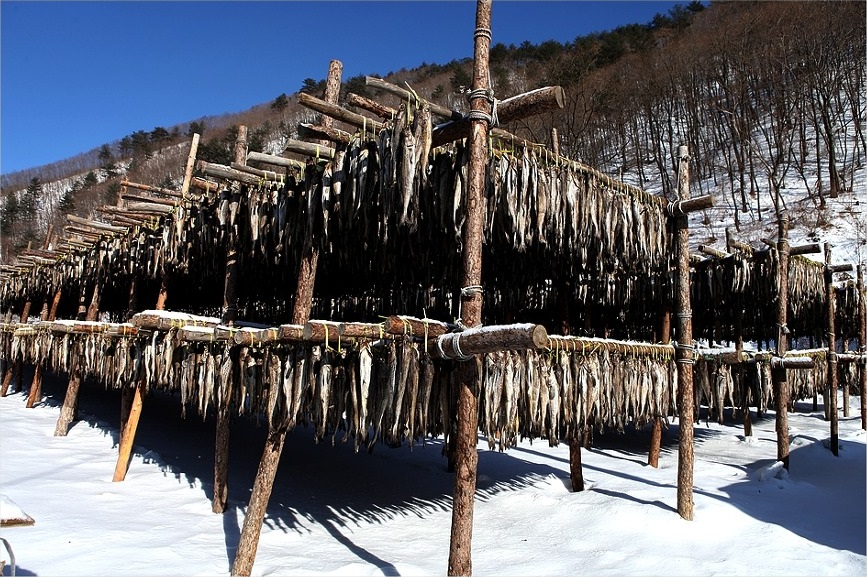
Drying hwangtae in winter

Alaska pollock is considered the "national fish" of Korea. The Korean name of the fish, myeongtae (명태; 明太), has also spread to some neighbouring countries: it is called mintay (минтай) in Russia and its roe is called mentaiko (明太子) in Japan, although the Japanese name for the fish itself is suketōdara (介党鱈). In Korea, myeongtae is called thirty-odd additional names, including saengtae (생태, fresh), dongtae (동태, frozen), bugeo (북어, dried), hwangtae (황태, dried in winter with repeated freezing and thawing), nogari (노가리, dried young), and kodari (코다리, half-dried young).

Koreans have been eating Alaska pollock since the Joseon era. One of the earliest mentions is from Seungjeongwon ilgi (Journal of the Royal Secretariat), where a 1652 entry stated: "The management administration should be strictly interrogated for bringing in pollock roe instead of cod roe." Alaska pollocks were the most commonly caught fish in Korea in 1940, when more than 270,000 tonnes were caught from the Sea of Japan. It outnumbers the current annual consumption of Alaska pollock in South Korea, estimated at 260,000 tonnes in 2016. Nowadays, however, Alaska pollock consumption in South Korea rely heavily on import from Russia, due to rises in sea water temperatures. In 2019, South Korea imposed a total ban on pollock fishing "to help replenish depleted stocks" of the fish.
