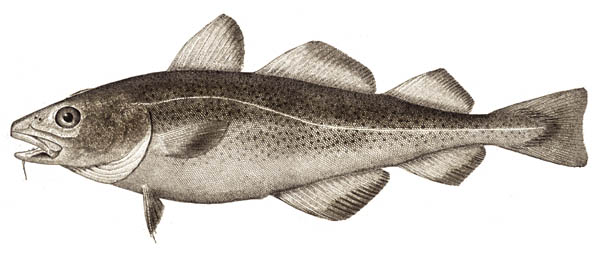
- Atlantic cod, Gadus morhua

Scientific classification
- Kingdom: Animalia
- Phylum: Chordata
- Class: Actinopterygii
- Order: Gadiformes
- Suborder: Gadoidei
- Family: Gadidae; Rafinesque, 1810

Genera
- See text

= Gadidae =

Gadidae Temporal range: Oligocene–recent

Family of ray-finned fishes

The Gadidae are a family of marine fish, included in the order Gadiformes, known as the cods, codfishes, or true cods. It contains several commercially important fishes, including the cod, haddock, whiting, and pollock.

Most gadid species are found in temperate waters of the Northern Hemisphere, but several range into subtropical, subarctic, and Arctic oceans, and a single (southern blue whiting) is found in the Southern Hemisphere. They are generally medium-sized fish, and are distinguished by the presence of three dorsal fins on the back and two anal fins on the underside. Most species have barbels on their chins, which they use while browsing on the sea floor. Gadids are carnivorous, feeding on smaller fish and crustaceans.

Gadids are highly prolific, producing several million eggs at each spawning. This contributes to their high population numbers, which, in turn, makes commercial fishing relatively easy.

== Taxonomy ==
In the past, the contents of this family varied depending on the taxonomic authority. For example, fishes in the current Lotidae (with burbot, cusk) and Phycidae (hakes) were included in the Gadidae, as its subfamilies Lotinae and Phycinae. However, they are presently considered distinct families from one another, based on phylogenetic analyses.

The following genera are placed in the Gadidae:

- Arctogadus Dryagin, 1932
- Boreogadus Günther, 1862
- Eleginus Fischer, 1813
- Gadiculus Guichenot, 1850
- Gadus Linnaeus, 1758
- Melanogrammus Gill, 1862
- Merlangius Garsault, 1764
- Microgadus Gill, 1865
- Micromesistius Gill, 1863
- Pollachius Nilsson, 1832
- Trisopterus Rafinesque, 1814

The following fossil genera are also known:

- †Palimphemus Kner, 1862 (early-late Miocene of Austria, Slovakia, Hungary, Croatia, Kazakhstan and North Caucasus, Russia)
- †Paratrisopterus Fedotov, 1971 (mid-late Miocene of Poland, Moldova, Romania, Ukraine, Abkhazia and North Caucasus, Russia)
- †Semeniolum Gaemers, 1984 [otolith] - (early-late Oligocene of the Netherlands and Germany)

== See also ==
- Diseases and parasites in cod
