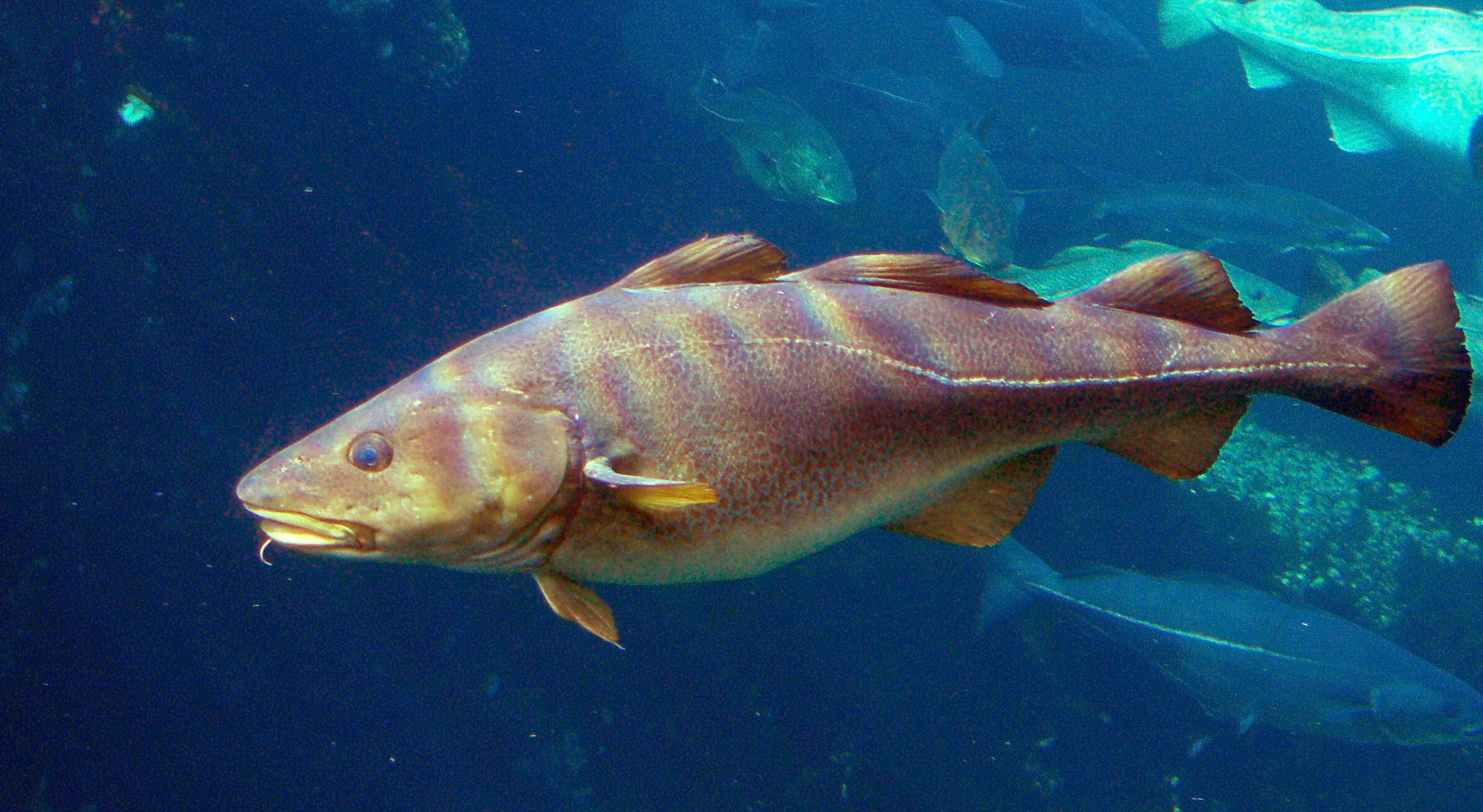
- Atlantic cod

Scientific classification
- Kingdom: Animalia
- Phylum: Chordata
- Class: Actinopterygii
- Division: Teleostei
- Cohort: Euteleostei
- Clade: Neoteleostei
- Clade: Eurypterygii
- Clade: Ctenosquamata
- Clade: Acanthomorpha

Groups included
- see text

= Cod =

Common name for several fish, but mainly the demersal genus Gadus

Cod (pl.: cod) is the common name for the demersal fish genus Gadus, belonging to the family Gadidae. Cod is also used as part of the common name for several other fish species, and one species that belongs to genus Gadus is not commonly called cod (Alaska pollock, Gadus chalcogrammus).

The two most common species of cod are the Atlantic cod (Gadus morhua), which lives in the colder waters and deeper sea regions throughout the North Atlantic, and the Pacific cod (Gadus macrocephalus), which is found in both eastern and western regions of the northern Pacific. Gadus morhua was named by Linnaeus in 1758. (However, G. morhua callarias, a low-salinity, nonmigratory race restricted to parts of the Baltic, was originally described as Gadus callarias by Linnaeus.)

Cod as food is popular in several parts of the world. It has a mild flavour and a dense, flaky, white flesh. Cod livers are processed to make cod liver oil, a common source of vitamin A, vitamin D, vitamin E, and omega-3 fatty acids (EPA and DHA). Scrod is young Atlantic cod or haddock. In the United Kingdom, Atlantic cod is one of the most common ingredients in fish and chips, along with haddock and plaice.

== Species ==
At times in the past, taxonomists included many species in the genus Gadus (from Ancient Greek: γάδος, romanized: gádos). Most of these are now either classified in other genera or have been recognized as forms of one of three species. All these species have several common names, most of them ending with the word "cod" (see naming), whereas other species, closely related, have other common names (such as pollock and haddock). However, many other unrelated species also have common names ending in "cod". Usage often varies across localities and over time.

=== Cod in the genus Gadus/True cod ===
Three species in the genus Gadus are currently called cod:

Cod in the genus Gadus
Common name	Scientific name	Maximum length	Common length	Maximum weight	Maximum age	Trophic level	Fish Base	FAO	ITIS	IUCN status
Atlantic cod	Gadus morhua Linnaeus, 1758	200 cm	100 cm	96.0 kg	25 years	4.4				Vulnerable
Pacific cod	Gadus macrocephalus Tilesius, 1810	119 cm	cm	22.7 kg	18 years	4.0				Not assessed
Greenland cod	Gadus ogac Richardson, 1836	77.0 cm	cm	kg	12 years	3.6				Not assessed

The fourth species of genus Gadus, Gadus chalcogrammus, is commonly called Alaska pollock or walleye pollock. But there are also less widespread alternative trade names highlighting the fish's belonging to the cod genus, like snow cod or bigeye cod.

=== Related species ===
Cod forms part of the common name of many other fish no longer classified in the genus Gadus. Many are members of the family Gadidae; others are members of three related families within the order Gadiformes whose names include the word "cod": the morid cods, Moridae (100 or so species); the eel cods, Muraenolepididae (four species); and the Eucla cod, Euclichthyidae (one species). The tadpole cod family (Ranicipitidae) has now been placed in Gadidae.

"Cod" in the order Gadiformes, but not part of Gadus
Common name	Scientific name	Maximum length	Common length	Maximum weight	Maximum age	Trophic level	Fish Base	FAO	ITIS	IUCN status
Arctic cod	Arctogadus glacialis (Peters, 1872)	32.5 cm	cm	kg	years	3.8				Not assessed
East Siberian cod	Arctogadus borisovi (Dryagin, 1932)	55.6 cm	cm	1.5 kg	years	3.9				Not assessed
Eucla cod	Euclichthys polynemus (McCulloch, 1926)	35.0 cm	22.5 cm	kg	years	3.6				Not assessed
Common ling	Molva molva (Linnaeus, 1758)	200 cm	106 cm	45.0 kg	25 years	4.3				Not assessed
Pelagic cod	Melanonus gracilis (Günther, 1878)	18.7 cm	cm	kg	years	3.5				Not assessed
Polar cod	Boreogadus saida (Lepechin, 1774)	40.0 cm	25.0 cm	kg	7 years	3.1				Not assessed
Poor cod	Trisopterus minutus (Linnaeus, 1758)	40.0 cm	20.0 cm	kg	5 years	3.8				Not assessed
Rock cod	Lotella rhacina (Forster, 1801)	50.0 cm	cm	kg	years	3.5				Not assessed
Saffron cod	Eleginus gracilis (Tilesius, 1810)	55.0 cm	cm	1.3 kg	15 years	4.1				Not assessed
Small-headed cod	Lepidion microcephalus (Cowper, 1956)	48.0 cm	cm	kg	years	3.5				Not assessed
Tadpole cod	Guttigadus globosus (Paulin, 1986)	18.1 cm	cm	kg	3.5 years					Not assessed

Some fish have common names derived from "cod", such as codling, codlet, or tomcod. ("Codling" is also used as a name for a young cod.)

=== Other species ===
Some fish commonly known as cod are unrelated to Gadus. Part of this name confusion is market-driven. Severely shrunken Atlantic cod stocks have led to the marketing of cod replacements using culinary names of the form "x cod", according to culinary rather than phyletic similarity. The common names for the following species have become well established; note that all inhabit the Southern Hemisphere.

==== Perciformes ====
Fish of the order Perciformes that are commonly called "cod" include:

- Blue cod Parapercis colias
- Eastern freshwater cod Maccullochella ikei
- Mary River cod Maccullochella mariensis
- Murray cod Maccullochella peelii
- Potato cod Epinephelus tukula
- Black cod (Saddletail grouper) Epinephelus daemelii
- Sleepy cod Oxyeleotris lineolatus
- Trout cod Maccullochella macquariensis
- The notothen family, Nototheniidae, including:
  - Antarctic cod Dissostichus mawsoni
    - Dissostichus eliginoides, the Patagonian toothfish, is also marketed as "cod"
  - Black cod Notothenia microlepidota
  - Maori cod Paranotothenia magellanica

==== Rock cod, reef cod, and coral cod ====
Almost all coral cod, reef cod or rock cod are also in order Perciformes. Most are better known as groupers, and belong to the family Serranidae. Others belong to the Nototheniidae. Two exceptions are the Australasian red rock cod, which belongs to a different order (see below), and the fish known simply as the rock cod and as soft cod in New Zealand, Lotella rhacina, which as noted above actually is related to the true cod (it is a morid cod).

==== Scorpaeniformes ====
From the order Scorpaeniformes:

- Ling cod Ophiodon elongatus
- Red rock cod Scorpaena papillosa
- Rock cod Sebastes

==== Ophidiiformes ====
The tadpole cod family, Ranicipitidae, and the Eucla cod family, Euclichthyidae, were formerly classified in the order Ophidiiformes, but are now grouped with the Gadiformes.

=== Marketed as cod ===
Some fish that do not have "cod" in their names are sometimes sold as cod. Haddock and whiting belong to the same family, the Gadidae, as cod.

- Haddock Melanogrammus aeglefinus
- Whiting Merlangius merlangus

== Characteristics ==
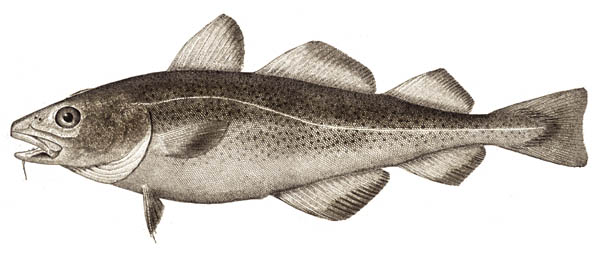
The Atlantic cod, Gadus morhua

Cods of the genus Gadus have three rounded dorsal and two anal fins. The pelvic fins are small, with the first ray extended, and are set under the gill cover (i.e. the throat region), in front of the pectoral fins. The upper jaw extends over the lower jaw, which has a well-developed chin barbel. The eyes are medium-sized, approximately the same as the length of the chin barbel. Cod have a distinct white lateral line running from the gill slit above the pectoral fin, to the base of the caudal or tail fin. The back tends to be a greenish to sandy brown, and shows extensive mottling, especially towards the lighter sides and white belly. Dark brown colouration of the back and sides is not uncommon, especially for individuals that have resided in rocky inshore regions.

The Atlantic cod can change colour at certain water depths. It has two distinct colour phases: gray-green and reddish brown. Its average weight is 5–12 kilograms (11–26 pounds), but specimens weighing up to 100 kg (220 lb) have been recorded. Pacific cod are smaller than Atlantic cod and are darker in colour.

== Distribution ==
Atlantic cod (Gadus morhua) live in the colder waters and deeper sea regions throughout the North Atlantic. Pacific cod (Gadus macrocephalus) is found in both eastern and western regions of the Pacific.

Atlantic cod could be further divided into several stocks, including the Arcto-Norwegian, North Sea, Baltic Sea, Faroe, Iceland, East Greenland, West Greenland, Newfoundland, and Labrador stocks. There seems to be little interchange between the stocks, although migrations to their individual breeding grounds may involve distances of 300 kilometres (190 statute miles; 160 nautical miles) or more. For instance, eastern Baltic cod shows specific reproductive adaptations to low salinity compared to Western Baltic and Atlantic cod.

Atlantic cod occupy varied habitats, favouring rough ground, especially inshore, and are demersal in depths between 6 and 60 metres (20 and 200 feet; 3 and 30 fathoms), 80 m (260 ft; 44 fathoms) on average, although not uncommonly to depths of 600 m (2,000 ft; 330 fathoms). Off the Norwegian and New England coasts and on the Grand Banks of Newfoundland, cod congregate at certain seasons in water of 30–70 m (100–200 ft; 20–40 fathoms) depth. Cod are gregarious and form schools, although shoaling tends to be a feature of the spawning season.

== Life cycle ==
Spawning of northeastern Atlantic cod occurs between January and April (March and April are the peak months), at a depth of 200 metres (660 ft) in specific spawning grounds at water temperatures between 4 and 6 °C (39 and 43 °F). Around the UK, the major spawning grounds are in the middle to southern North Sea, the start of the Bristol Channel (north of Newquay), the Irish Channel (both east and west of the Isle of Man), around Stornoway, and east of Helmsdale.

Prespawning courtship involves fin displays and male grunting, which leads to pairing. The male inverts himself beneath the female, and the pair swim in circles while spawning. The eggs are planktonic and hatch between eight and 23 days, with larva reaching 4 millimetres (5/32 inch) in length. This planktonic phase lasts some ten weeks, enabling the young cod to increase its body weight by 40-fold, and growing to about 2 cm (3/4 in). The young cod then move to the seabed and change their diet to small benthic crustaceans, such as isopods and small crabs. They increase in size to 8 cm (3 in) in the first six months, 14–18 cm (5 1/2–7 in) by the end of their first year, and to 25–35 cm (10–14 in) by the end of the second. Growth tends to be less at higher latitudes. Cod reach maturity at about 50 cm (20 in) at about 3 to 4 years of age. Changes in growth rate over decades of particular stocks have been reported, current eastern Baltic cod shows the lowest growth observed since 1955.

== Ecology ==
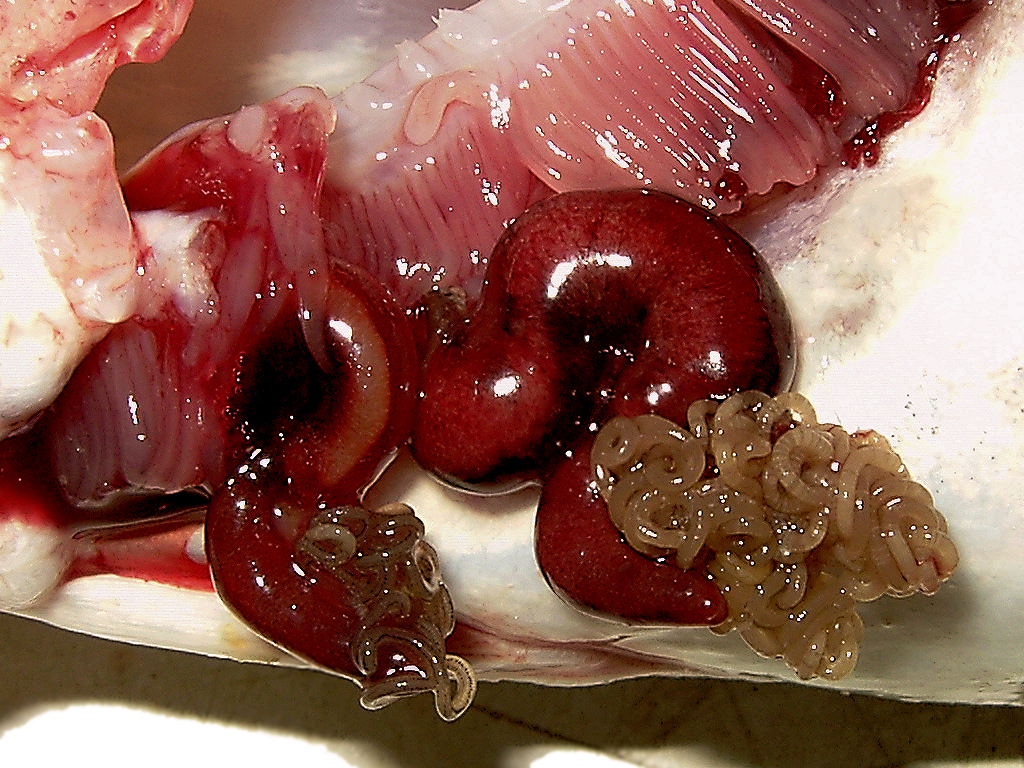
A fish with its gills infested with two cod worms

Adult cod are active hunters, feeding on sand eels, whiting, haddock, small cod, squid, crabs, lobsters, mussels, worms, mackerel, and molluscs.

In the Baltic Sea the most important prey species are herring and sprat. Many studies that analyze the stomach contents of these fish indicate that cod is the top predator, preying on the herring and sprat. Sprat form particularly high concentrations in the Bornholm Basin in the southern Baltic Sea. Although cod feed primarily on adult sprat, sprat tend to prey on the cod eggs and larvae.

Cod and related species are plagued by parasites. For example, the cod worm, Lernaeocera branchialis, starts life as a copepod-like larva, a small free-swimming crustacean. The first host used by the larva is a flatfish or lumpsucker, which it captures with grasping hooks at the front of its body. It penetrates the fish with a thin filament, which it uses to suck the fish's blood. The nourished larvae then mate on the fish. The female larva, with her now fertilized eggs, then finds a cod, or a cod-like fish such as a haddock or whiting. There the larva clings to the gills while it metamorphoses into a plump sinusoidal wormlike body with a coiled mass of egg strings at the rear. The front part of the worm's body penetrates the body of the cod until it enters the rear bulb of the host's heart. There, firmly rooted in the cod's circulatory system, the front part of the parasite develops like the branches of a tree, reaching into the main artery. In this way, the worm extracts nutrients from the cod's blood, remaining safely tucked beneath the cod's gill cover until it releases a new generation of offspring into the water.

== Fisheries ==
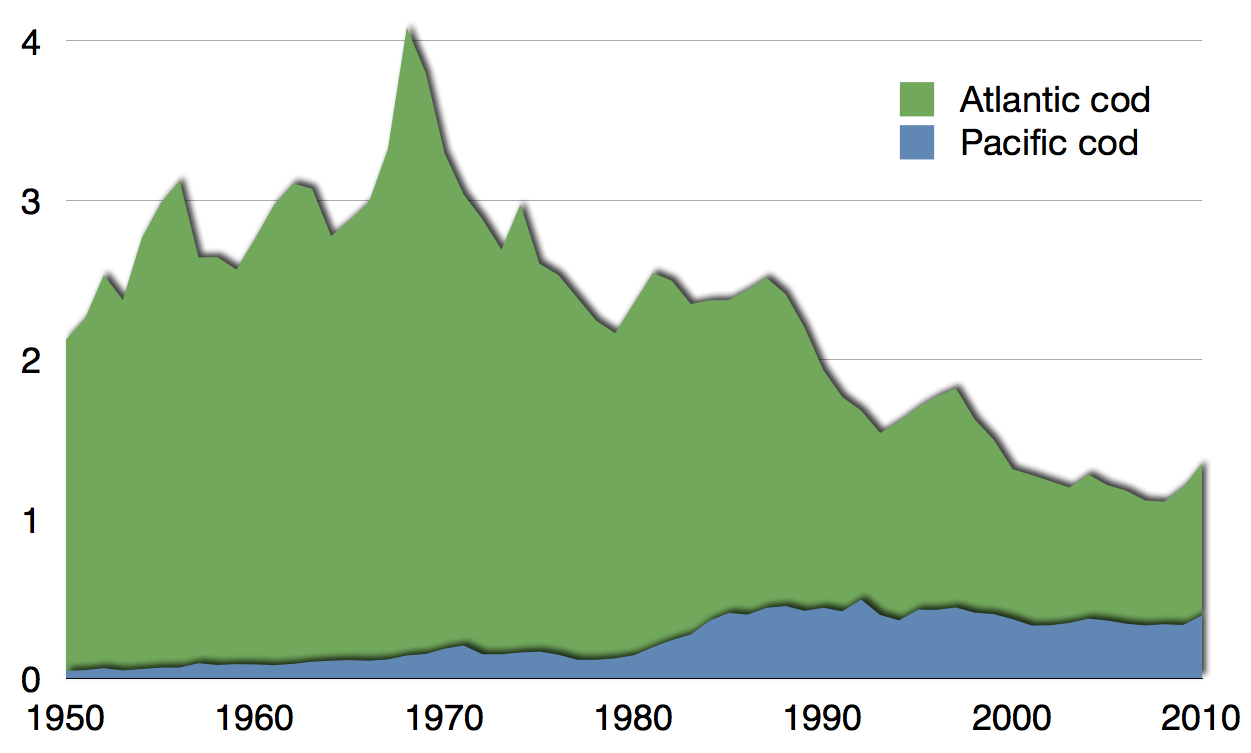
Global commercial capture of Atlantic and Pacific cod
in million tonnes reported by the FAO 1950–2010

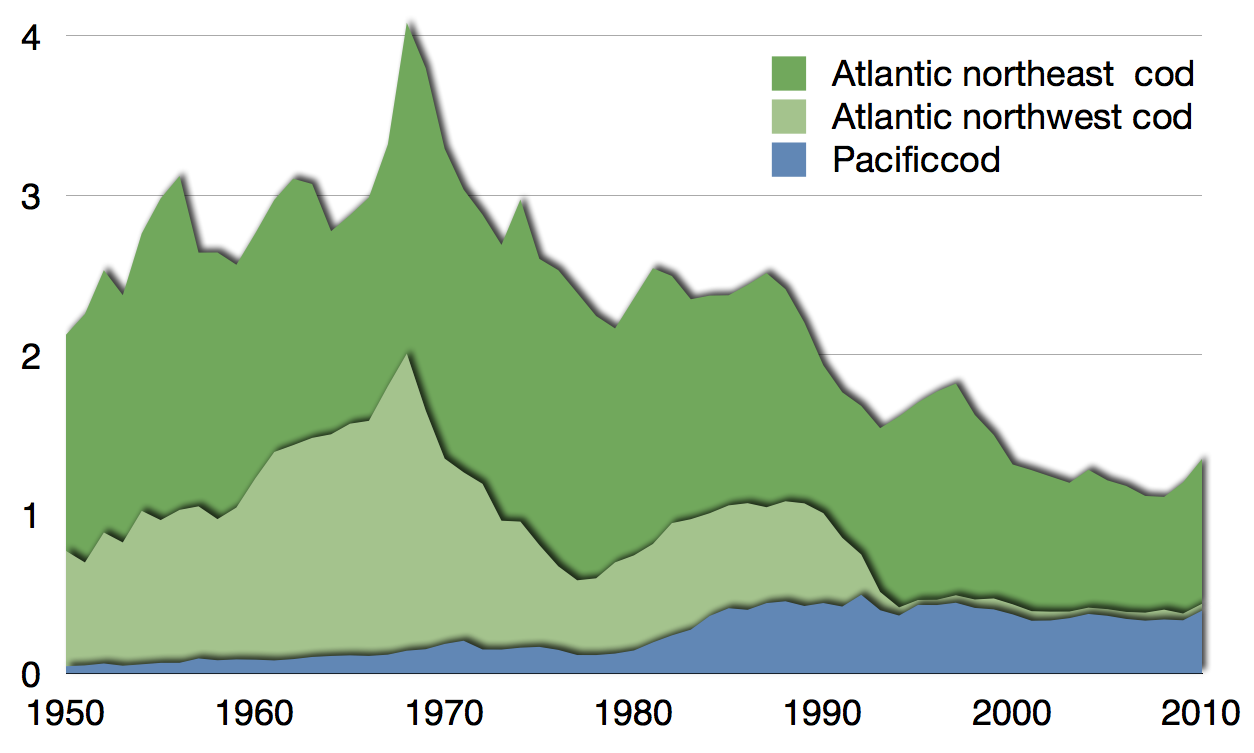
The same chart as above, but showing embedded in light green, the collapse of the Atlantic northwest cod fishery

The 2006 northwest Atlantic cod quota is 23,000 tons, representing half the available stocks, while the northeast Atlantic quota is 473,000 tons. Pacific cod is currently enjoying strong global demand. The 2006 total allowable catch (TAC) for the Gulf of Alaska and Aleutian Islands was 260,000 tons. In 2026, Canada increased the Northern cod quota by 55 per cent, from 38,000 tonnes to 59,000 tonnes.

== Aquaculture ==
Farming of Atlantic cod has received a significant amount of interest due to the overall trend of increasing cod prices alongside reduced wild catches. However, progress in creating large scale farming of cod has been slow, mainly due to bottlenecks in the larval production stage, where survival and growth are often unpredictable. It has been suggested that this bottleneck may be overcome by ensuring cod larvae are fed diets with similar nutritional content as the copepods they feed on in the wild Recent examples have shown that increasing dietary levels of minerals such as selenium, iodine and zinc may improve survival and/or biomarkers for health in aquaculture reared cod larvae.

== As food ==
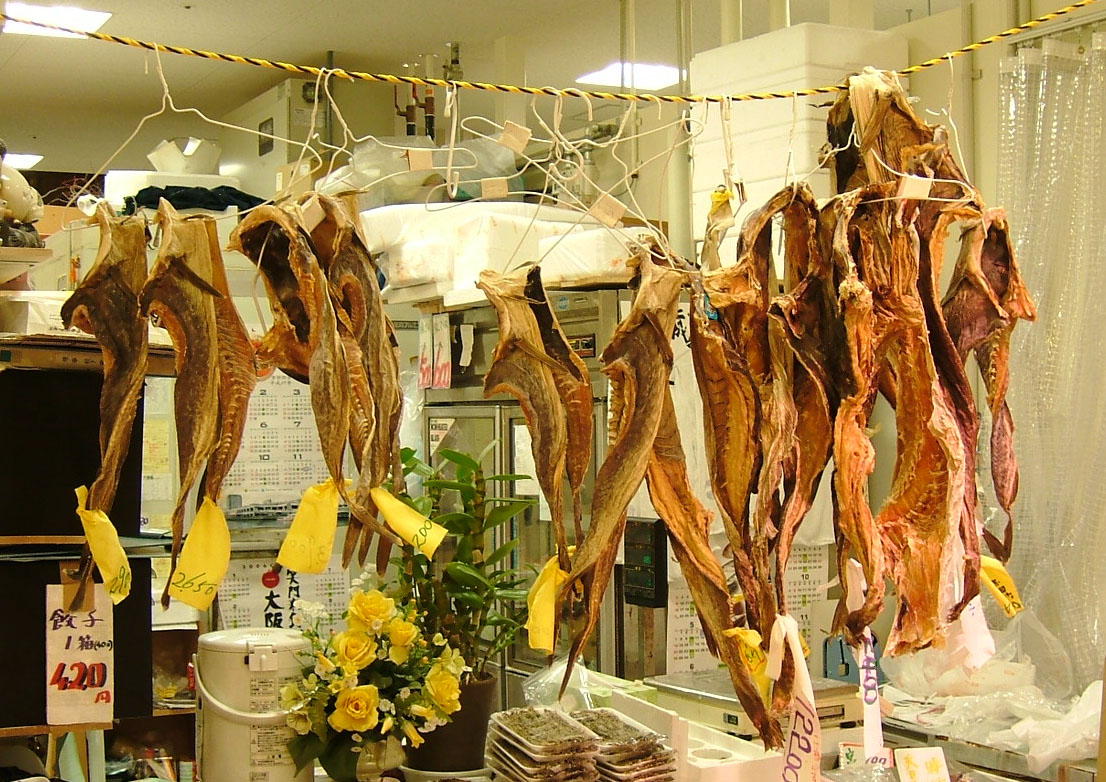
Preserved codfish

Cod is popular as a food with a mild flavour and a dense, flaky white flesh. Cod livers are processed to make cod liver oil, an important source of vitamin A, vitamin D, vitamin E and omega-3 fatty acids (EPA and DHA).

Young Atlantic cod or haddock prepared in strips for cooking is called scrod. In the United Kingdom, Atlantic cod is one of the most common ingredients in fish and chips, along with haddock and plaice. The cod's soft liver can be tinned (canned) and eaten.

== History ==
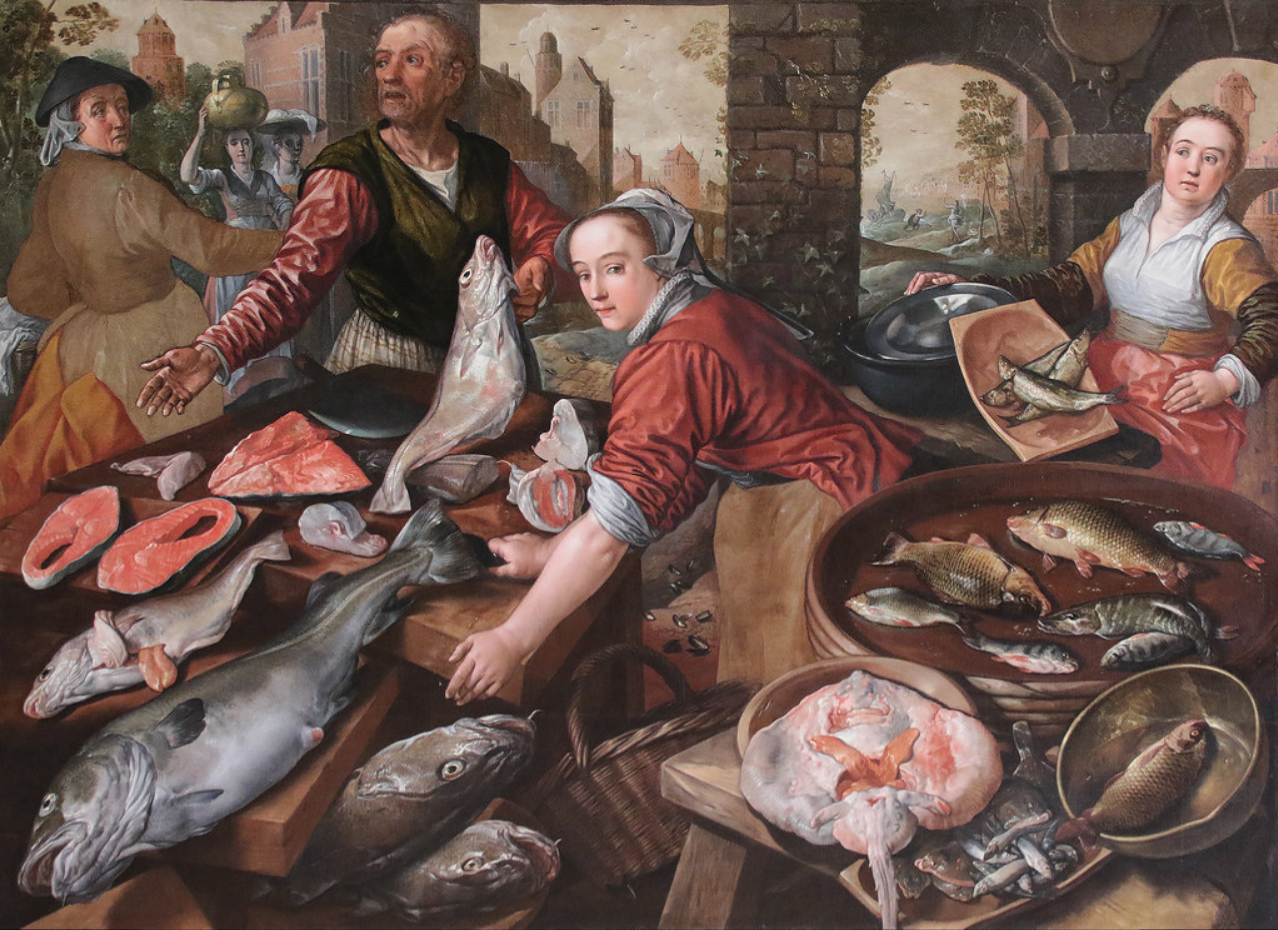
Sixteenth-century Flemish fishmonger displaying cod, by Joachim Beuckelaer

Cod has been an important economic commodity in international markets since the Viking period (around 800 AD). Norwegians travelled with dried cod and soon a dried cod market developed in southern Europe. This market has lasted for more than 1,000 years, enduring the Black Death, wars and other crises, and is still an important Norwegian fish trade. The Atlantic "cod" is first attested in Middle English from a document dated 1357; it is an outlier to other Germanic languages whose speakers that also fished and traded it in the same waters gave related names like German: Dorsch, Danish: torsk and Faroese: toskur. However, there is a proposal where Old Norse þoskr may have stabilized with influence of Flemish and Norman metathesized as scot, in which the pluralized les scots (with Norman definite article les) would be rebracketted as les cots thus cots reanalyzed as a plural form of cot or later cod.

The Portuguese began fishing cod in the 15th century. Clipfish is widely enjoyed in Portugal. The Basques played an important role in the cod trade, and allegedly found the Canadian fishing banks before Columbus' discovery of America. The North American east coast developed in part due to the vast cod stocks. Many cities in the New England area are located near cod fishing grounds. The fish was so important to the history and development of Massachusetts, the state's House of Representatives hung a wood carving of a codfish, known as the Sacred Cod of Massachusetts, in its chambers.

Apart from the long history, cod differ from most fish because the fishing grounds are far from population centres. The large cod fisheries along the coast of North Norway (and in particular close to the Lofoten islands) have been developed almost uniquely for export, depending on sea transport of stockfish over large distances. Since the introduction of salt, dried and salted cod (clipfish or 'klippfisk' in Norwegian) has also been exported. By the end of the 14th century, the Hanseatic League dominated trade operations and sea transport, with Bergen as the most important port.

William Pitt the Elder, criticizing the Treaty of Paris in Parliament, claimed cod was "British gold"; and that it was folly to restore Newfoundland fishing rights to the French.

In the 17th and 18th centuries in the New World, especially in Massachusetts and Newfoundland, cod became a major commodity, creating trade networks and cross-cultural exchanges. In 1733, Britain tried to gain control over trade between New England and the British Caribbean by imposing the Molasses Act, which they believed would eliminate the trade by making it unprofitable. The cod trade grew instead, because the "French were eager to work with the New Englanders in a lucrative contraband arrangement". In addition to increasing trade, the New England settlers organized into a "codfish aristocracy". The colonists rose up against Britain's "tariff on an import".

In the 20th century, Iceland re-emerged as a fishing power and entered the Cod Wars. In the late 20th and early 21st centuries, fishing off the European and American coasts severely depleted stocks and become a major political issue. The necessity of restricting catches to allow stocks to recover upset the fishing industry and politicians who are reluctant to hurt employment.

=== Collapse of the Atlantic northwest cod fishery ===
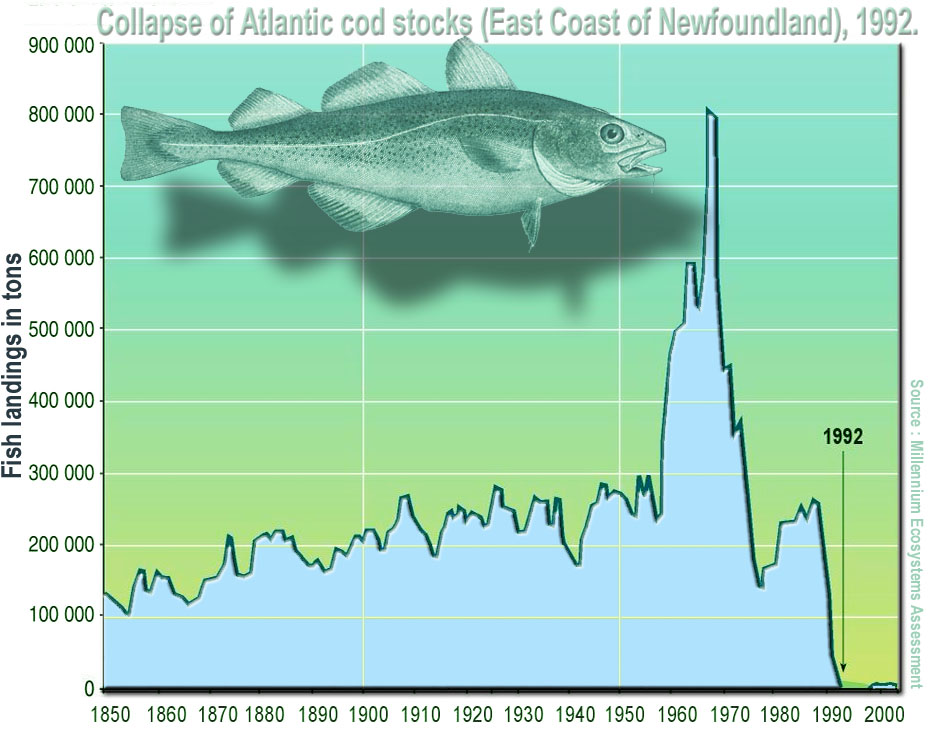
The Atlantic fishery abruptly collapsed in 1992, following overfishing since the late 1950s, and an earlier partial collapse in the 1970s.

On July 2, 1992, John Crosbie, Canadian Federal Minister of Fisheries and Oceans, declared a two-year moratorium on the Northern Cod fishery, a designated fishing region off the coast of Newfoundland, after data showed that the total cod biomass had suffered a collapse to less than 1% of its normal value. The minister championed the measure as a temporary solution, allowing the cod population time to recover. The fisheries had long shaped the lives and communities on Canada's Atlantic eastern coast for the preceding five centuries. Societies which are dependent on fishing have a strong mutual relationship with them: the act of fishing changes the ecosystems' balance, which forces the fishery and, in turn, the fishing societies to adapt to new ecological conditions.

The near-complete destruction of the Atlantic northwest cod biomass off the shores devastated coastal communities, which had been overexploiting the same cod population for decades. The fishermen along the Atlantic northwest had employed modern fishing technologies, including the ecologically devastating practice of trawling, especially in the years leading up to the 1990s, in the misguided belief that fishing stocks are perpetually plentiful and unable to be depleted. After this assumption was empirically and abruptly shown to be incorrect, to the dismay of government officials and rural workers, some 19,000 fishermen and cod processing plant workers in Newfoundland lost their employment. Nearly 40,000 workers and harvesters in the provinces of Newfoundland and Labrador applied for the federal relief program TAGS (the Atlantic Groundfish Strategy). Abandoned and rusting fishing boats still litter the coasts of Newfoundland and the Canadian northwest to this day.

The fishery minister, John Crosbie, after delivering a speech on the day before the declaration of the moratorium, or July 1, 1992, was publicly heckled and verbally harassed by disgruntled locals at a fishing village. The moratorium, initially lasting for only two years, was indefinitely extended after it became evident that cod populations had not recovered at all but, instead, had continued to spiral downward in both size and numbers, due to the damage caused by decades of destructive fishing practices, and the fact that the moratorium had permitted exceptions for food fisheries for "personal consumption" purposes to this very day. Some 12,000 tons of Northwest cod are still being caught every year along the Newfoundland coast by local fishermen.

The collapse of the four-million ton biomass, which had persevered through several previous marine extinctions over tens of millions of years, in a timespan of no more than 20 years, is oft-cited by researchers as one of the most visible examples of the phenomenon of the "Tragedy of the Commons." Factors which had been implicated as contributing to the collapse include: overfishing; government mismanagement; the disregard of scientific uncertainty; warming habitat waters; declining reproduction; and plain human ignorance. The Northern Cod biomass has been recovering slowly since the imposition of the moratorium. However, as of 2021, the growth of the cod population has been stagnant since 2017, and some scientists argue that the population will not rebound unless the Fisheries Department of Canada lower its yearly quota to 5,000 tons.

Historical images
History

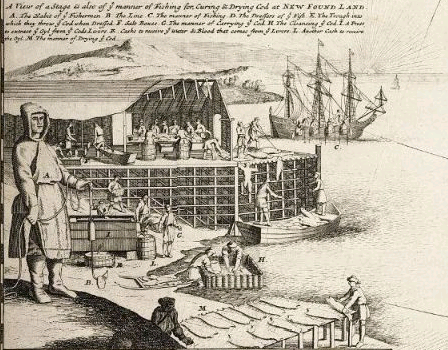
Fishing stage for curing and drying cod, Herman Moll 1654–1732

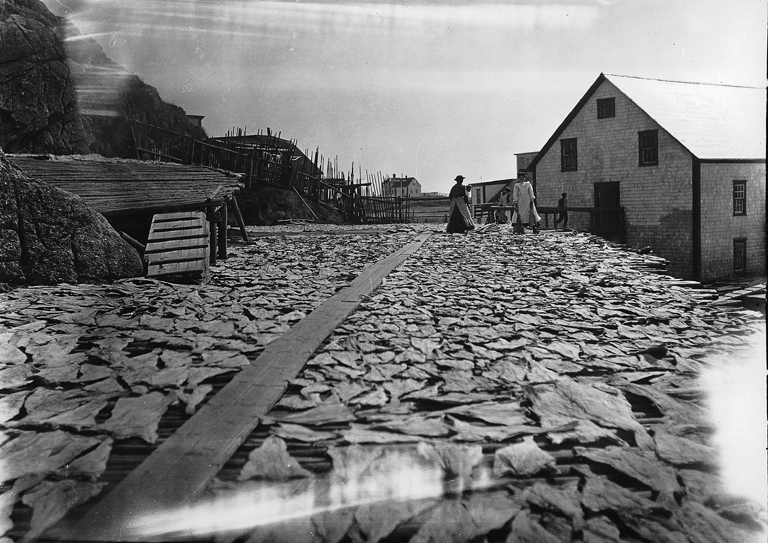
Drying fish 1908

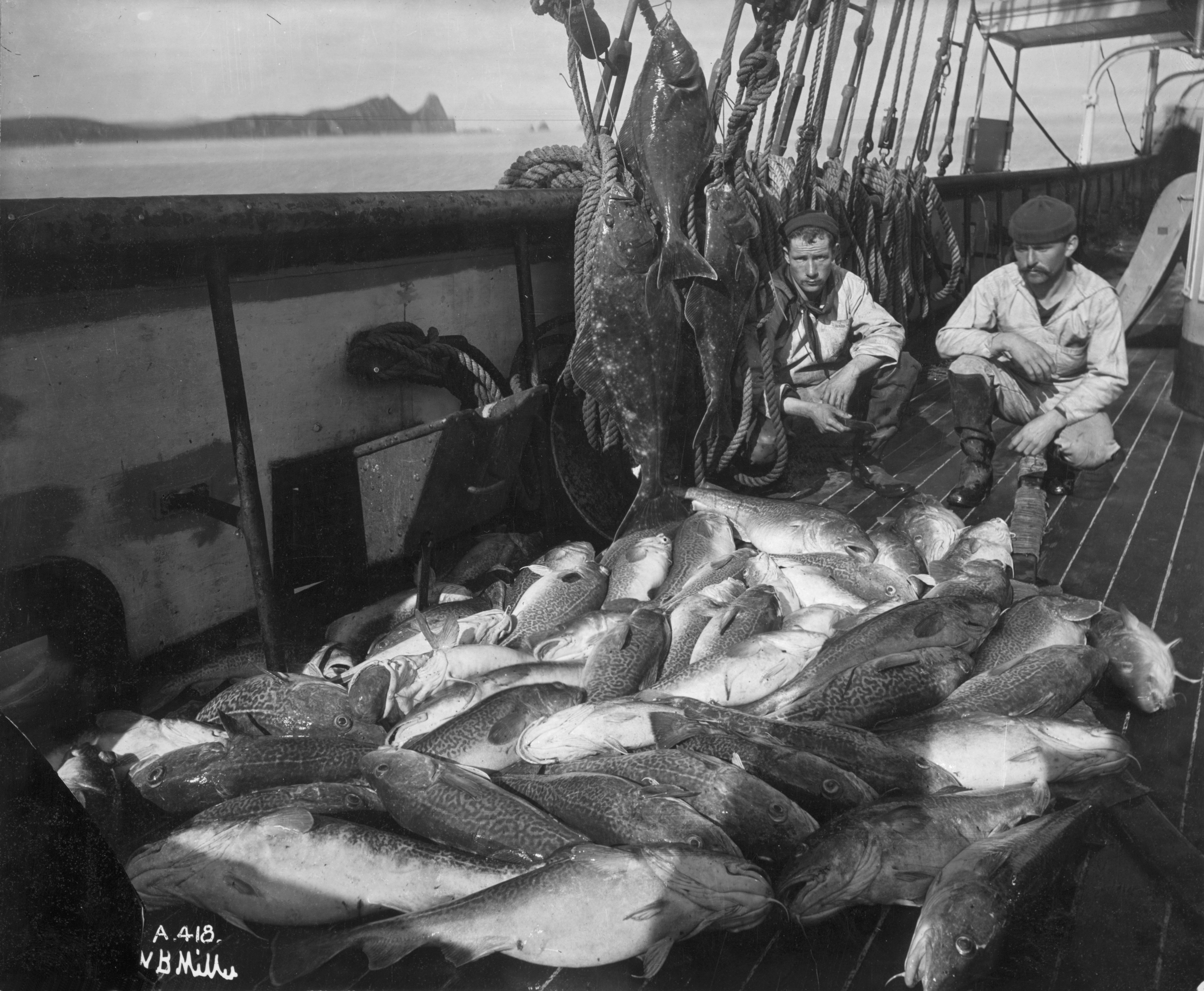
Cod and halibut before 1927

History

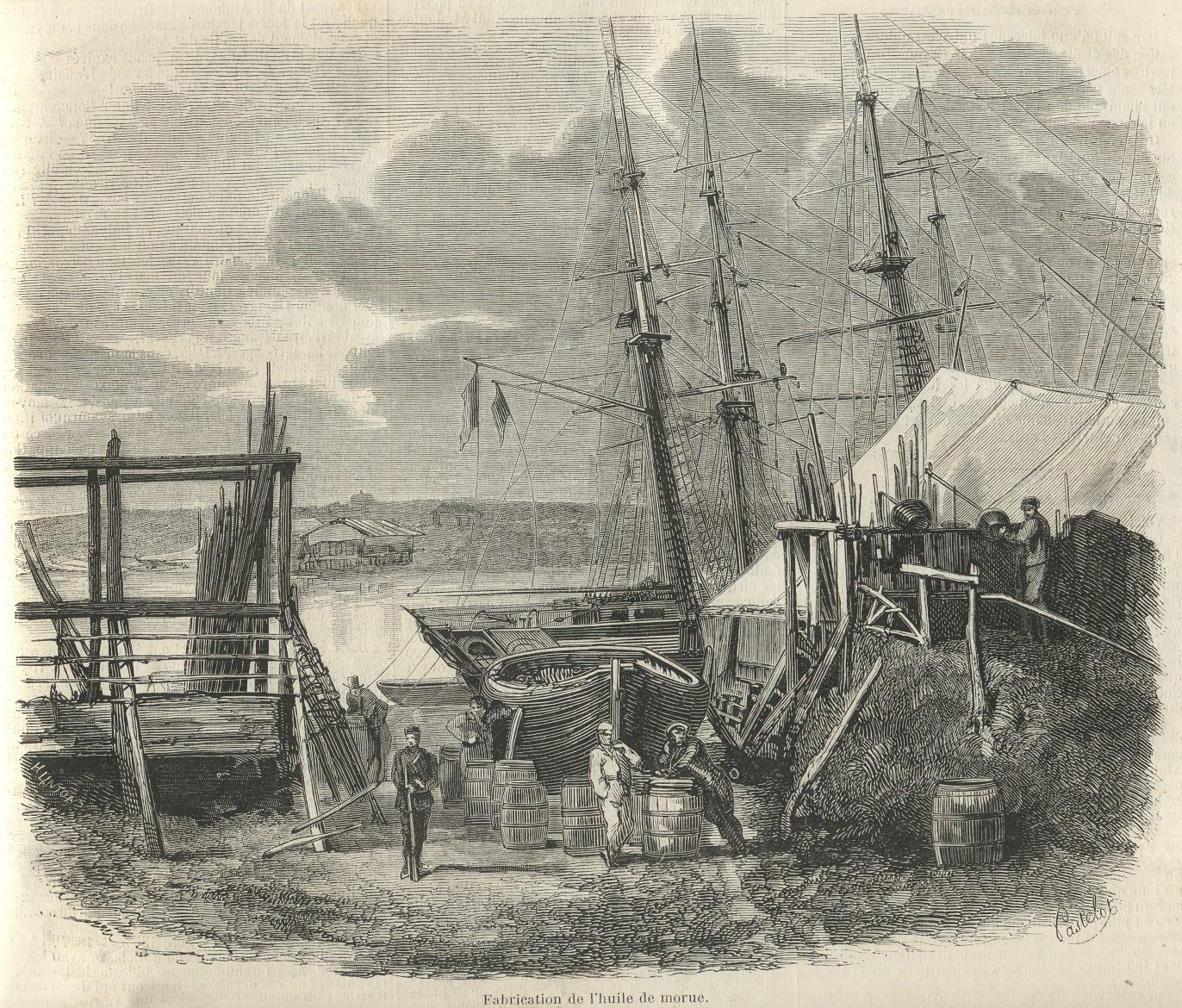
Manufacturing cod-liver oil,
Newfoundland 1858

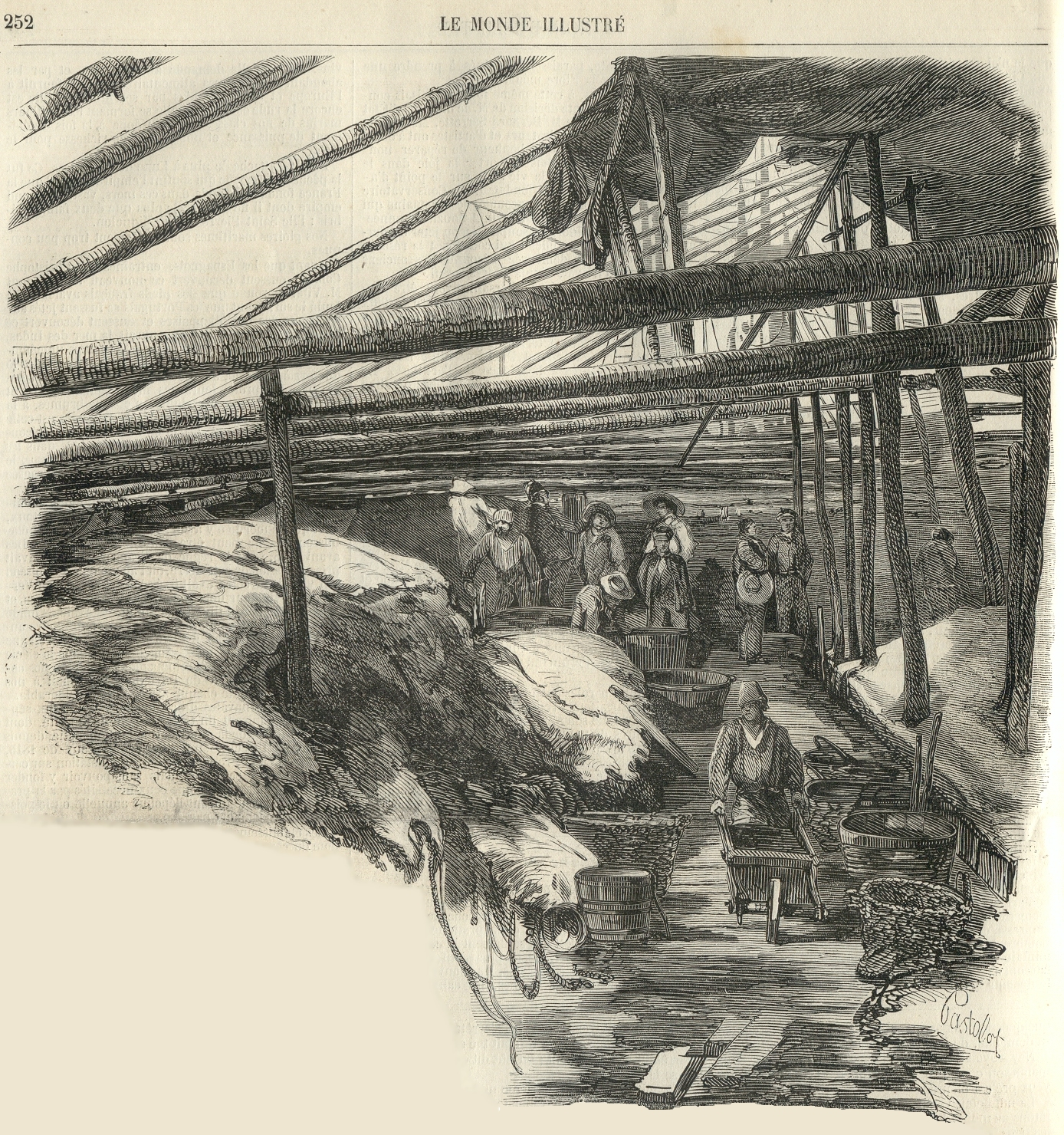
Cod fishery,
Newfoundland 1858

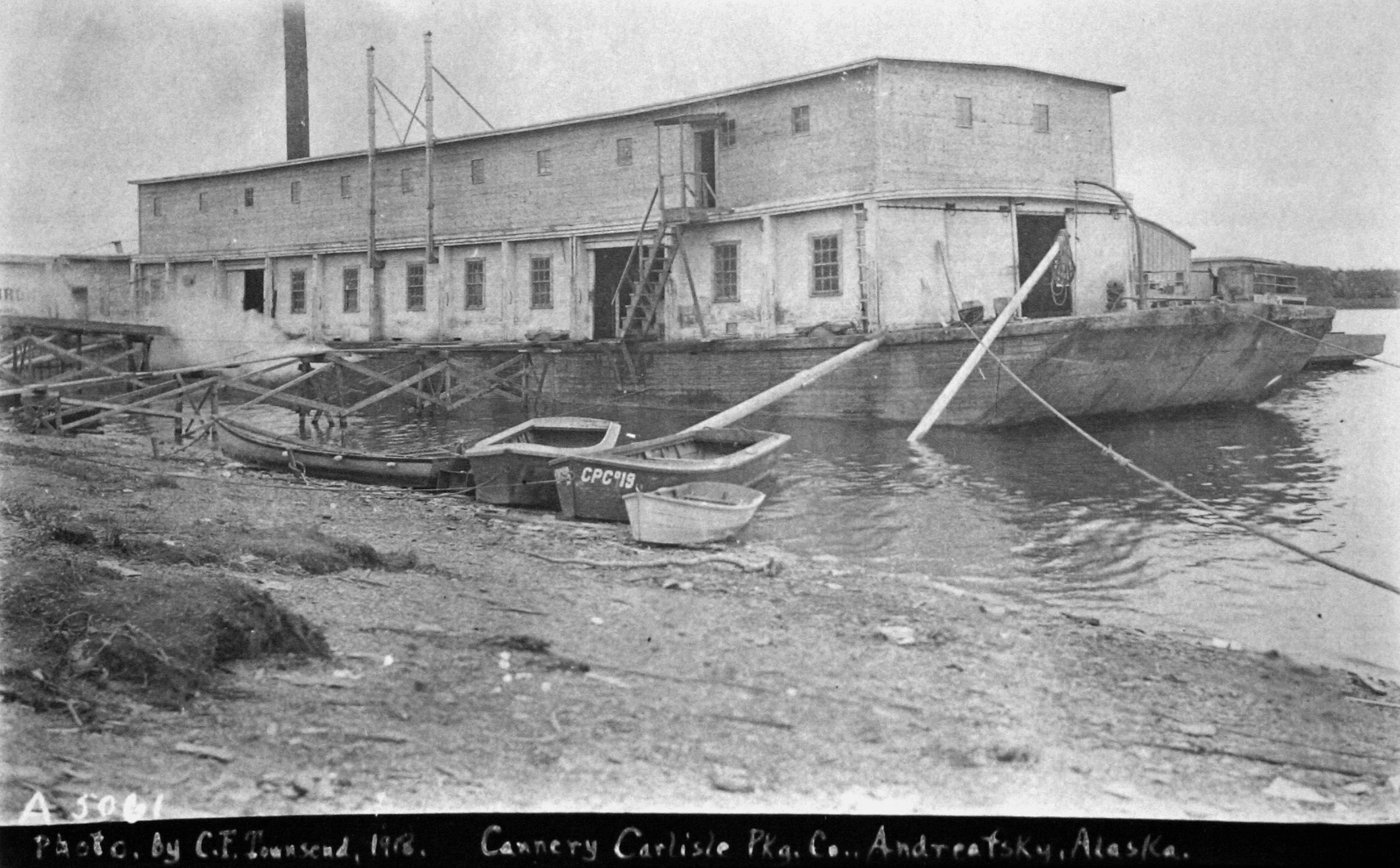
Carlisle Packaging Company, a floating cod cannery, Yukon River, Alaska c. 1918

Paintings

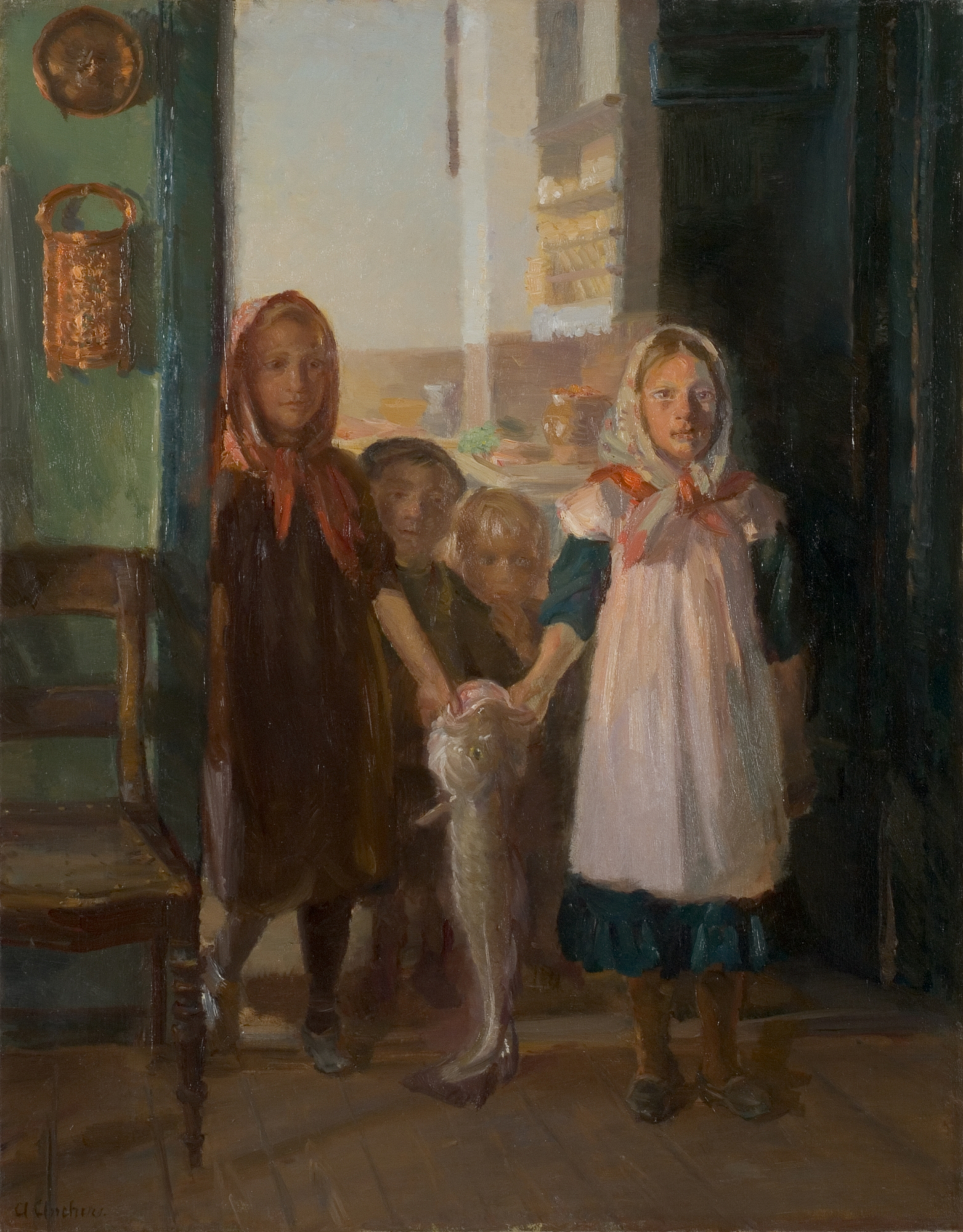
Little Girl with a Cod, Anna Ancher

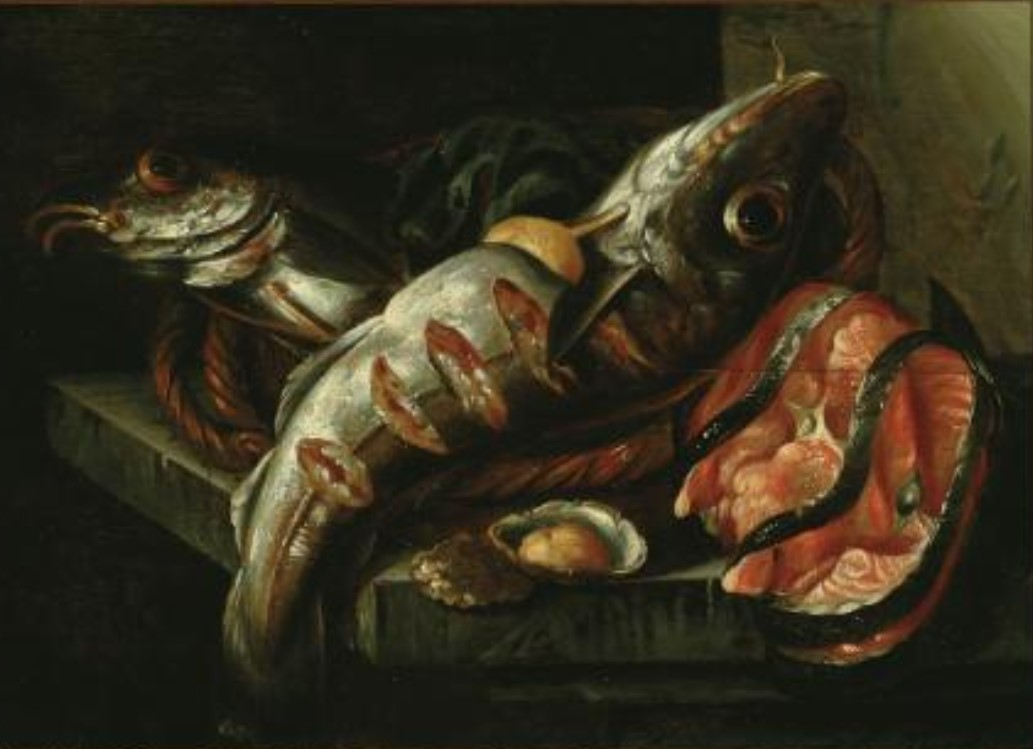
Still-life with fish and shellfish, Isaac van Duynen

Stamps

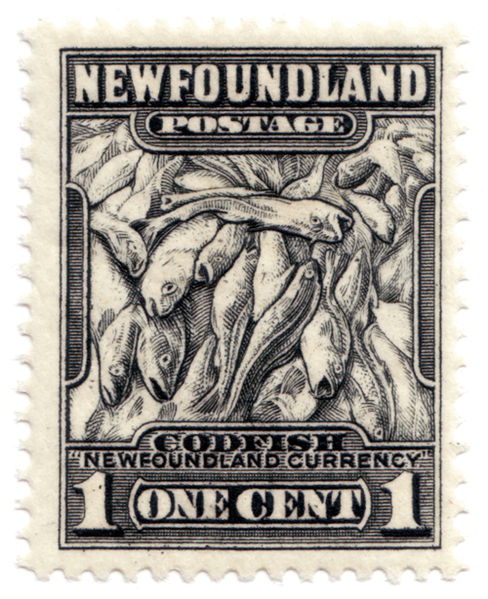
Cod postage stamp, Newfoundland

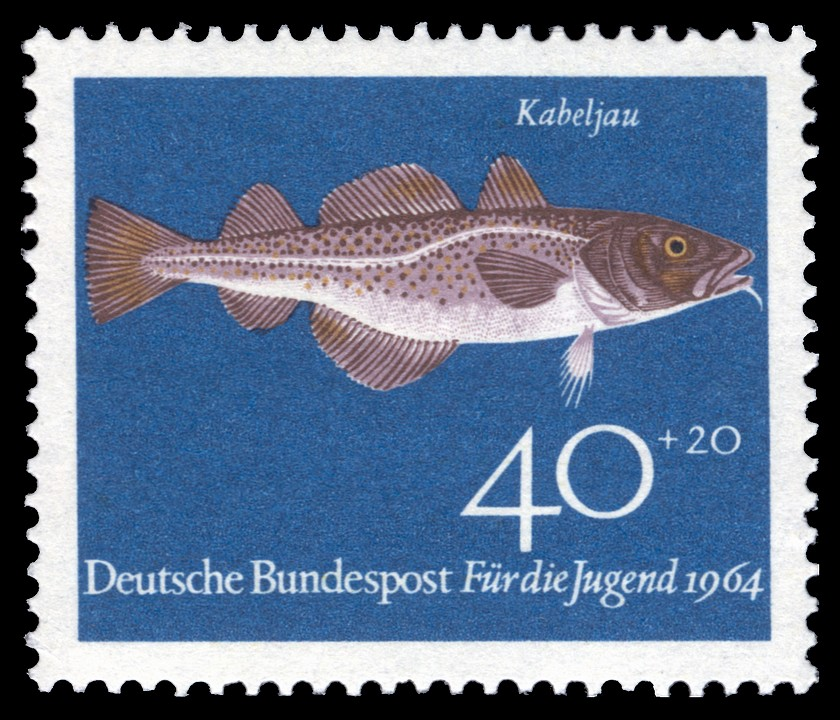

== See also ==
- The Cod Fisheries: The History of an International Economy, for the Canadian industry
