= Cod as food =

Gadidae fishes in human nutrition and cooking

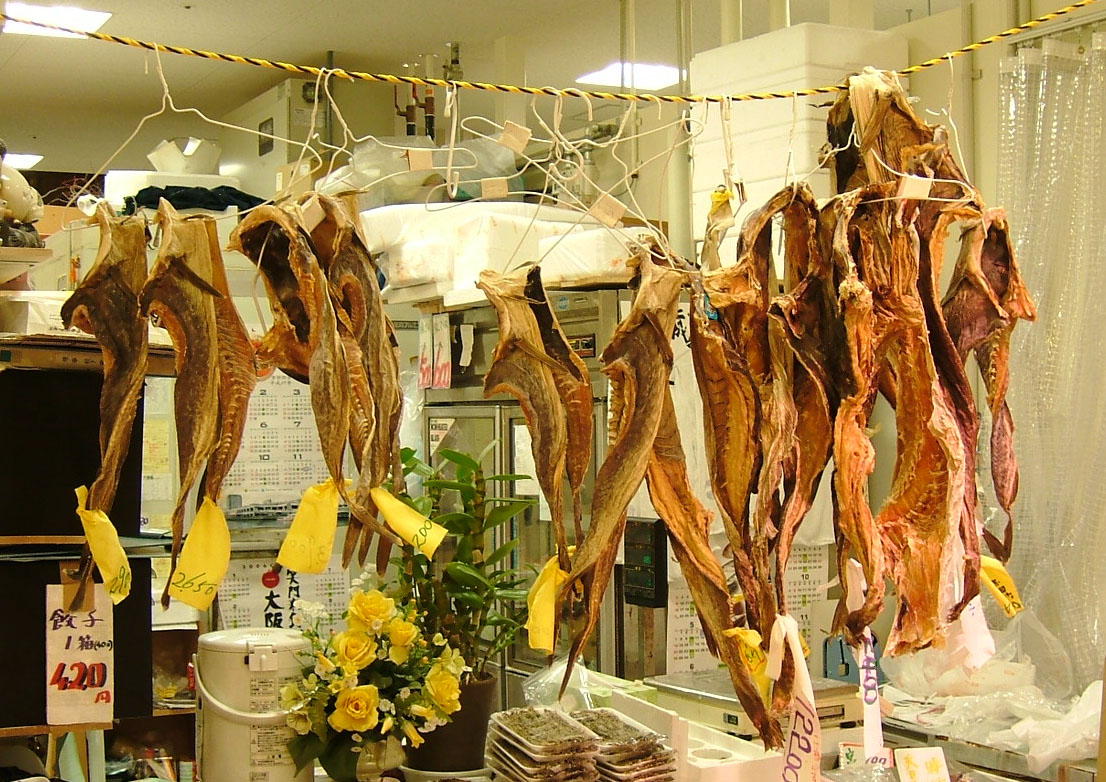
Preserved codfish

Cod and other cod-like fish have been widely used as food through history. Other cod-like fish come from the same family (Gadidae) that cod belong to, such as haddock, pollock, and whiting.

== Cod ==
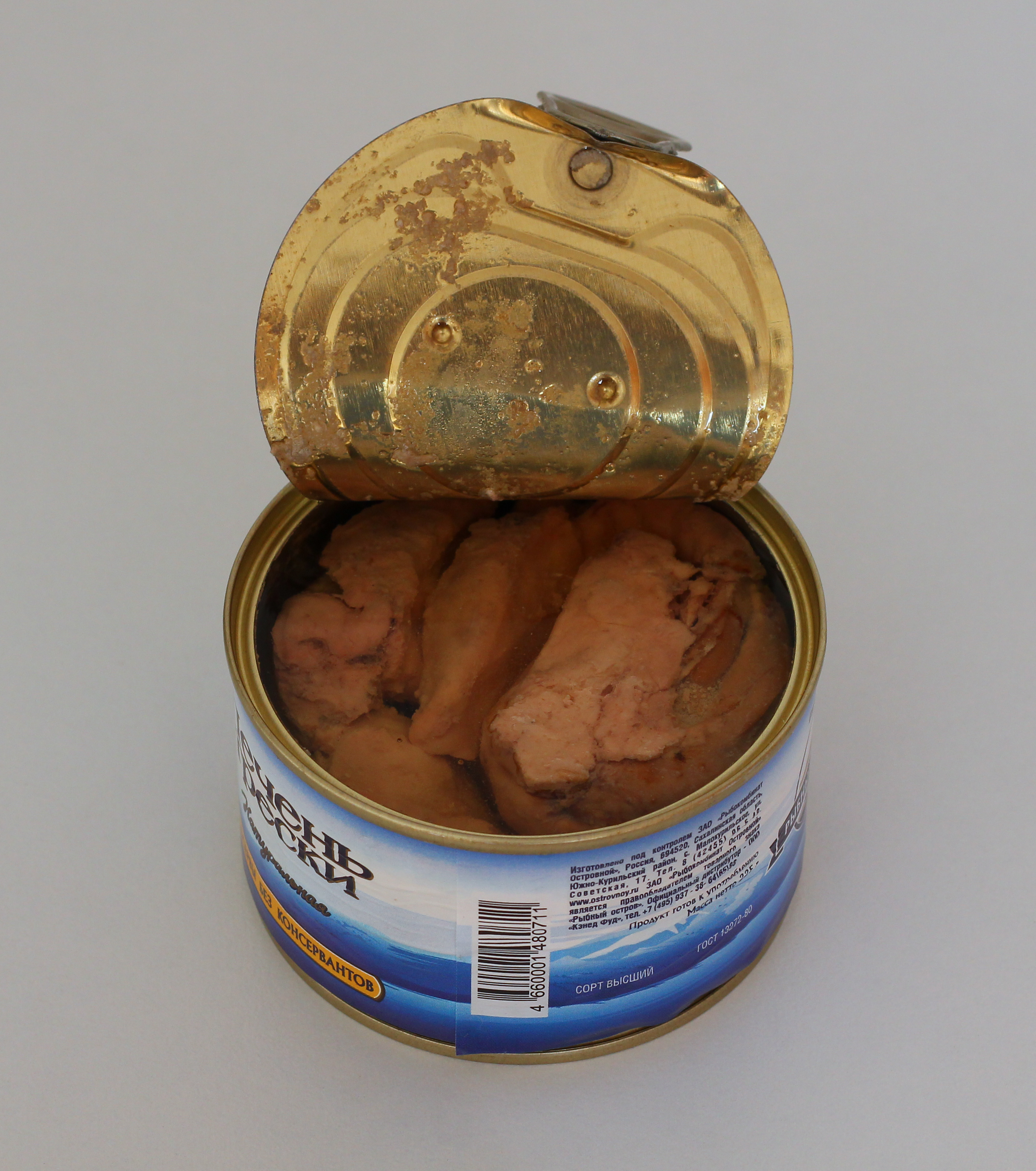
Canned cod liver

Cod is popular as a food with a mild flavour and a dense, flaky white flesh. Young Atlantic cod or haddock prepared in strips for cooking is called scrod. The cod's head has two main variety meat cuts: the cod tongue (not actually the tongue, but the lower jaw and chin barbel); and the cod cheek. The swim bladder is also a delicacy or traditional food, such as in Portugal.

Cod's soft liver can be canned or fermented into cod liver oil, providing an excellent source of vitamin A, vitamin D, vitamin E and omega-3 fatty acids (EPA and DHA).

In the United Kingdom, Atlantic cod is one of the most common ingredients in fish and chips, along with haddock and plaice. Cod can be easily turned into various other products, such as cod liver oil, omega pills, etc.

According to the laws of kashrut, cod is considered kosher because it is a fish with both fins and scales.

== Other cod-like fish ==
=== Haddock ===
Haddock, roast
Nutritional value per 100 g (3.5 oz)
- Energy: 469 kJ (112 kcal)
- Carbohydrates: 0.0 g
- Dietary fiber: 0.0 g
- Fat: 0.93 g
- Protein: 24.24 g
Vitamins and minerals
Vitamins	Quantity %DV^{†}
Thiamine (B1)	3% 0.040 mg
Riboflavin (B2)	3% 0.045 mg
Niacin (B3)	29% 4.632 mg
Pantothenic acid (B5)	3% 0.150 mg
Vitamin B6	20% 0.346 mg
Folate (B9)	3% 13 μg
Vitamin C	0% 0.00 mg
Minerals	Quantity %DV^{†}
Calcium	3% 42 mg
Iron	8% 1.35 mg
Magnesium	12% 50 mg
Phosphorus	19% 241 mg
Potassium	13% 399 mg
Zinc	4% 0.48 mg
- ^{†}Percentages estimated using US recommendations for adults, except for potassium, which is estimated based on expert recommendation from the National Academies.

Haddock is a popular food fish, sold fresh, smoked, frozen, dried, and, to a small extent, canned. Haddock, along with cod and plaice, is one of the most popular fish used in British fish and chips.

Fresh haddock has a clean white flesh and can be cooked in the same ways as cod. Freshness of a haddock fillet can be determined by how well it holds together, as a fresh one will be firm; also, fillets should be translucent, while older fillets turn a chalky hue. Young, fresh haddock and cod fillets are often sold as scrod in Boston, Massachusetts; this refers to the size of the fish which have a variety of sizes, i.e. scrod, markets, and cows. Haddock is the predominant fish of choice in Scotland in a fish supper. It is also the main ingredient of Norwegian fishballs (fiskeboller).

Unlike the related cod, haddock does not salt well and is often preserved by drying and smoking.

The smoking of haddock is something that was highly refined in Grimsby. Traditional Grimsby smoked fish (mainly haddock, but sometimes cod) is produced in the traditional smoke houses in Grimsby, which are mostly family-run businesses that have developed their skills over many generations. Grimsby fish market sources its haddock from the North East Atlantic, principally Iceland, Norway and Faroe. These fishing grounds are sustainably managed and have not seen the large scale depreciation in fish stocks seen in EU waters.

One popular form of haddock is Finnan haddie, named for the fishing village of Finnan or Findon in Scotland, where it was originally cold-smoked over peat. Finnan haddie is often served poached in milk for breakfast.

The town of Arbroath on the east coast of Scotland produces the Arbroath Smokie. This is a hot-smoked haddock which requires no further cooking before eating.

Smoked haddock naturally has an off-white color; it is very often dyed yellow, as are other smoked fish. Smoked haddock is the essential ingredient in the Anglo-Indian dish kedgeree.

In 2010, Greenpeace International has added the haddock to its seafood red list. "The Greenpeace International seafood red list is a list of fish that are commonly sold in supermarkets around the world, and which have a very high risk of being sourced from unsustainable fisheries."

=== Pollock ===
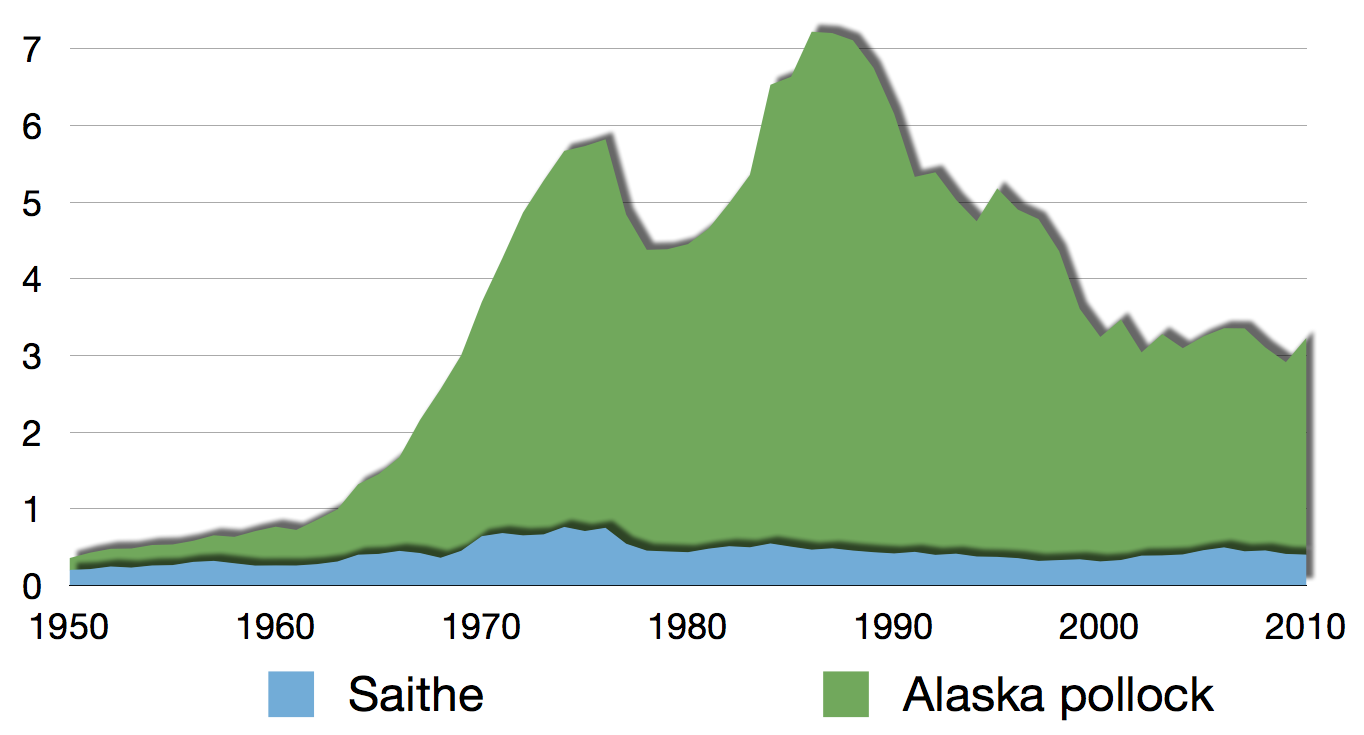
Global commercial capture of pollock in million tonnes 1950–2010

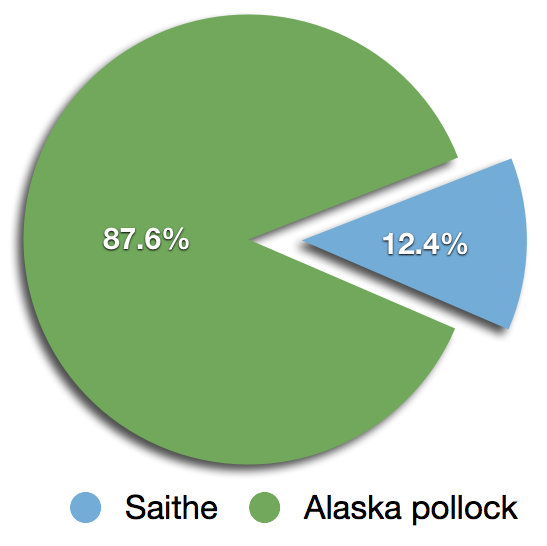
The total capture of pollock in 2010 as reported by the FAO was 3.2 million tonnes (3.5 million short tons).

Atlantic pollock is largely considered to be a whitefish. Traditionally a popular source of food in some countries, such as Norway, in the United Kingdom it has previously been largely consumed as a cheaper and versatile alternative to cod and haddock. However, in recent years, pollock has become more popular due to overfishing of cod and haddock. It can be found in most supermarkets as fresh fillets or prepared freezer items. For example, it is used minced in fish fingers or as an ingredient in imitation crab meat and is commonly used to make fish and chips.

Because of its slightly grey colour, pollock is often prepared, as in Norway, as fried fish balls, or if juvenile-sized, breaded with oatmeal and fried, as in Shetland. Year-old fish are traditionally split, salted, and dried over a peat hearth in Orkney, where their texture becomes wooden. Coalfish can also be salted and smoked and achieve a salmon-like orange color (although it is not closely related to the salmon), as is the case in Germany, where the fish is commonly sold as Seelachs ("sea salmon").

In 2009, UK supermarket Sainsbury's briefly renamed Atlantic pollock "colin" in a bid to boost ecofriendly sales of the fish as an alternative to cod. Sainsbury's, which said the new name was derived from the French for cooked pollock (colin), launched the product under the banner "Colin and chips can save British cod."

Pollock is regarded as a "low-mercury fish" – a woman weighing 60 kg (130 lb) can safely eat up to 510 g (18 oz) per week, and a child weighing 20 kg (44 lb) can safely eat up to 170 g (6 oz).

== List of dishes ==
Name	Image	Origin	Description
Ackee and saltfish		Jamaica	Salt cod sautéed with boiled ackee, onions, Scotch Bonnet peppers (optional), tomatoes, and spices, such as black pepper and pimiento. It can be garnished with crisp bacon and fresh tomatoes, and is usually served as breakfast or dinner alongside breadfruit, hard dough bread, dumplings, fried plantain, or bogreen bananas. Jamaica's national dish.
Bacalaíto		Puerto Rico and Dominican Republic	Salt cod fritters filled with minced cod fish and garnished with cilantro, tomatoes and onions. A traditional snack typically eaten with an entire meal. Bacalaítos are served at the beach, cuchifritos, and at festivals. They are crisp on the outside and dense and chewy in the inside.
Baccalà mantecato		Italy	A Venetian appetizer of whipped salt cod.
Cabbie claw		Scotland and Orkney	Made with speldings, young fish of the family Gadidae such as cod, haddock or whiting. The name is a derivative of cabillaud, the French name for cod. Other ingredients include parsley, horseradish and mashed potato. The sauce is made with butter, flour, milk, hard-boiled eggs, and nutmeg. Alternate versions outside the traditional version's only difference are usually an addition of more spices.
Bacalhau à Brás		Portugal	Made with eggs, onions thinly sliced, potatoes in matchstick-size, salt codfish, soaked, minced garlic clove, extra virgin olive oil, bunch fresh parsley, chopped black Portuguese olives, salt and pepper.
Crappit heid		Scotland	(English: stuffed head). Can be traced to the fishing communities of the North, Hebrides and North-Eastern Scotland in the eighteenth century. In a time when money was scarce, the more expensive fillets of fish, such as cod or haddock would be sold to market but the offal and less attractive parts were retained by the fisherfolk for the pot.
Cullen skink		Scotland	Thick soup made of smoked haddock, potatoes and onions. An authentic cullen skink will use finnan haddie, but it may be prepared with any other undyed smoked haddock. The soup is often served as a starter at formal Scottish dinners. It has been described as "smokier and more assertive than American chowder and heartier than classical French bisque".
Fish and brewis		Newfoundland	Consists of cod and hard bread or hard tack. With the abundance of cod around the coasts of Newfoundland and Labrador it became synonymous with many Newfoundland households as a delicacy to be served as a main meal. Salt fish is soaked in water overnight to reduce the salt content. The hard bread is broken into bite-size pieces, and is also soaked in water overnight. The next day, the fish and hard bread are boiled separately until tender, and then both are served together. The traditional meal is served with scrunchions, salted pork fat which has been cut into small pieces and fried. Both the rendered fat and the liquid fat are then drizzled over the fish and hard bread.
Fish ball		Widespread	Usually made from a white fish, such as cod or haddock
Fishcake		British	Similar to a croquette, consisting of a filleted fish and potato patty sometimes coated in breadcrumbs or batter, and fried. Salted cod is traditionally used as a filling, though since cod stocks have become depleted other varieties of white fish are used, such as haddock or whiting. The fishcake has been seen as a way of using up leftovers that might otherwise be thrown away. In Mrs Beeton's 19th century publication Book of Household Management, her recipe for fishcakes calls for "leftover fish" and "cold potatoes".
Fish finger		United Kingdom	
Esqueixada		Catalonia	A salad of shredded salt cod, tomatoes, onions, olive oil and vinegar, salt, and sometimes a garnish of olives or hard-boiled eggs.
Fish fry		Widespread	
Fish pie			
Fried fish		Widespread	
Lutefisk		Nordic countries	
Pescado frito		Spain	
Scrod		New England and Atlantic Canada	
Shirako (milt)		Widespread	
Taramosalata		Greece	
Traditional Grimsby smoked fish		Grimsby, England	

== See also ==
- Alaska pollock as food
- Arbroath smokie
- Bacalhau
- Boknafisk
- Cod liver oil
- Dried and salted cod
- Stockfish
- Filet-O-Fish
- List of smoked foods
