= Bacalhau do Batata =

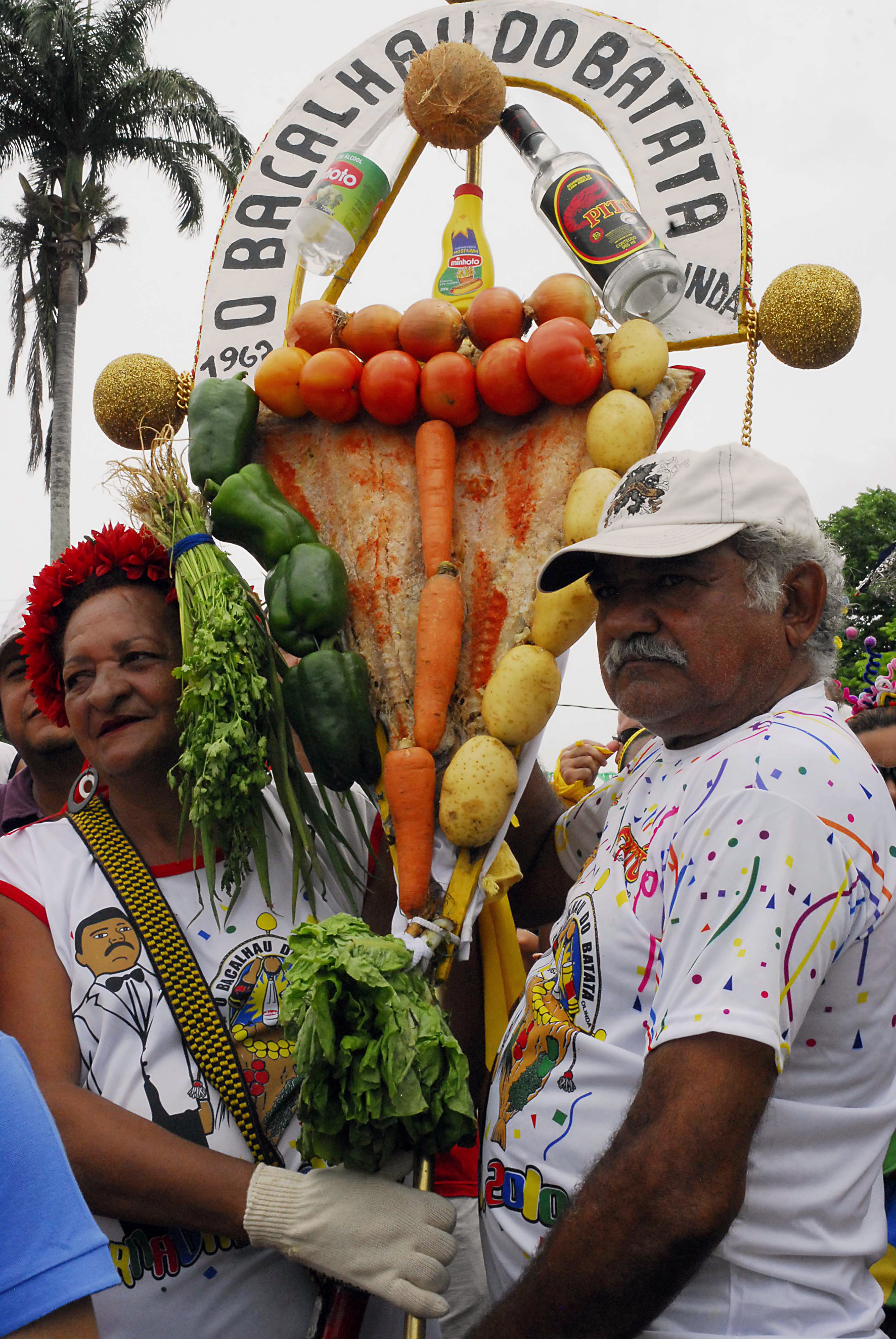
- Bacalhau do Batata's standard

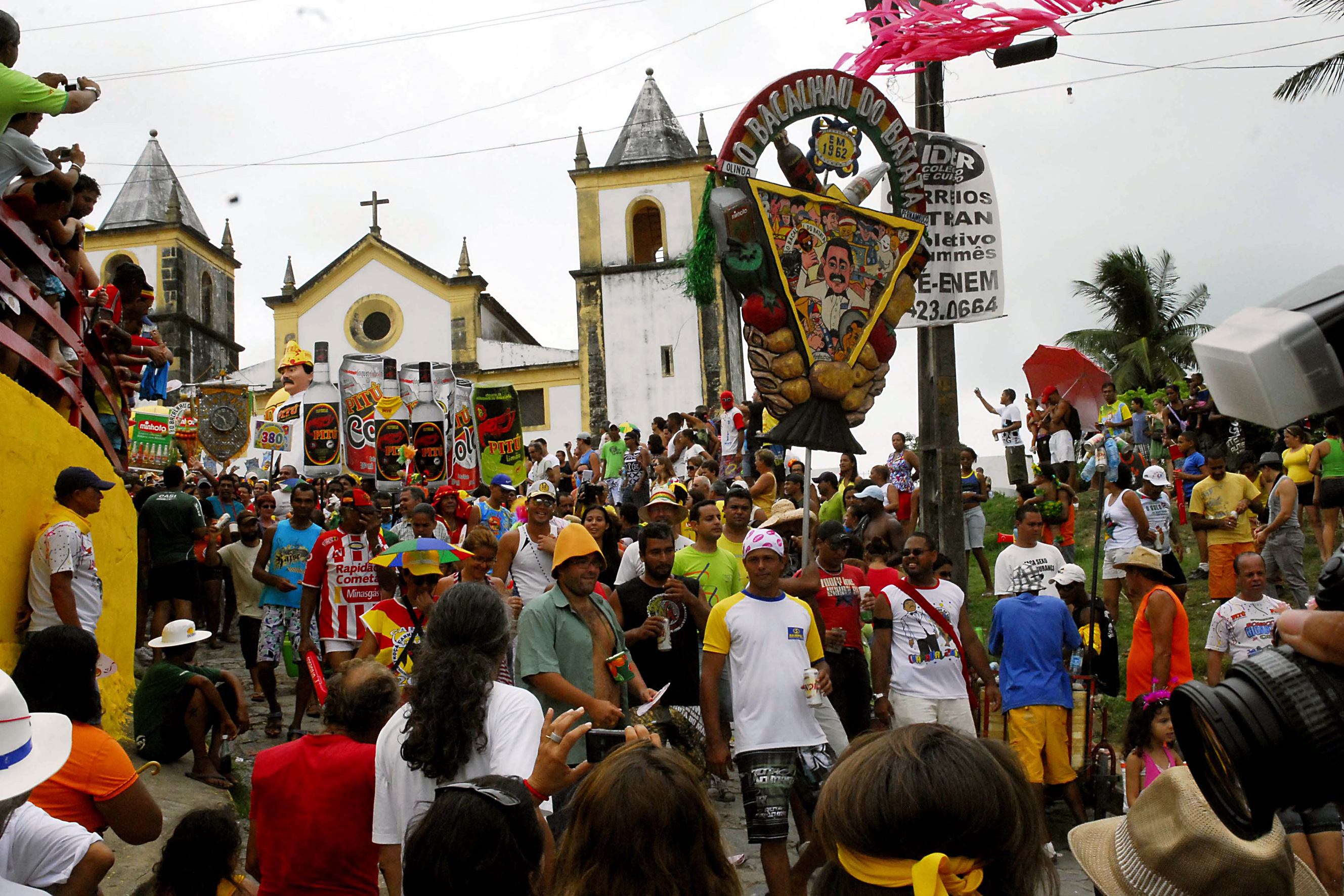
- Block parading in Olinda
- Foundation: March 7, 1962; 64 years ago
- Symbol: dried cod ornamented with vegetables
- Location: Olinda

Bacalhau do Batata (Portuguese: Batata's Cod) is a carnival block from Olinda. It parades on Ash Wednesdays at noon, precisely at the after the official carnival end. The block was in 1962 founded by the waiter Isaias "Batata" Ferreira da Silva, whom worked in the regular carnival days since, and therefore could not enjoy the festivities. The block's symbol is a dried cod ornamented with potatoes, carrots, paprikas, and other vegetables. "The Batata Cod was founded in 1962. We, who could not play because they worked on holidays, joined in the joke. I was part of the foundation," recalled one of the directors of the block, Antonio Lucena, 69, while it held the official banner of the association, made with vegetables and pieces of natural cod.

In 2007 the samba school Imperatriz Leopoldinense, from Rio de Janeiro, honored Bacalhau do Batata with a wing, with reference still in its samba-song: "E o Bacalhau do Batata na traeja pra massa / Até o dia clarear...". The waiter Isaiah was highlighted, represented by Irênio Dias. In all, fourteen different costumes represented the Pernambucan bloco, and the school's Composers' Wing paraded dressed as a waiter. The bloco was also represented by the "Bacalhau do Batata" samba samba.
