= Cabbie claw =

Fish dish

Cabbie claw or cabelew is a traditional dish from the northeast of Scotland and Orkney. It is traditionally made using speldings, young fish of the family Gadidae, such as cod, haddock or whiting. The name is a derivative of cabillaud, the French name for cod. The dish consists of cod served in white sauce with chopped egg white in it.

== Preparation ==
To make it, the cod is cleaned, then rubbed with salt inside and out, then hung outside to dry in the wind for 24 to 48 hours. The cod is then simmered for about half an hour in enough water to cover it, flavoured with horseradish and parsley. Cabbie claw is initially prepared in a frying pan, then in the oven.

Other ingredients include parsley, horseradish and mashed potato. The sauce is made with butter, flour, milk, hard-boiled eggs, and nutmeg.
