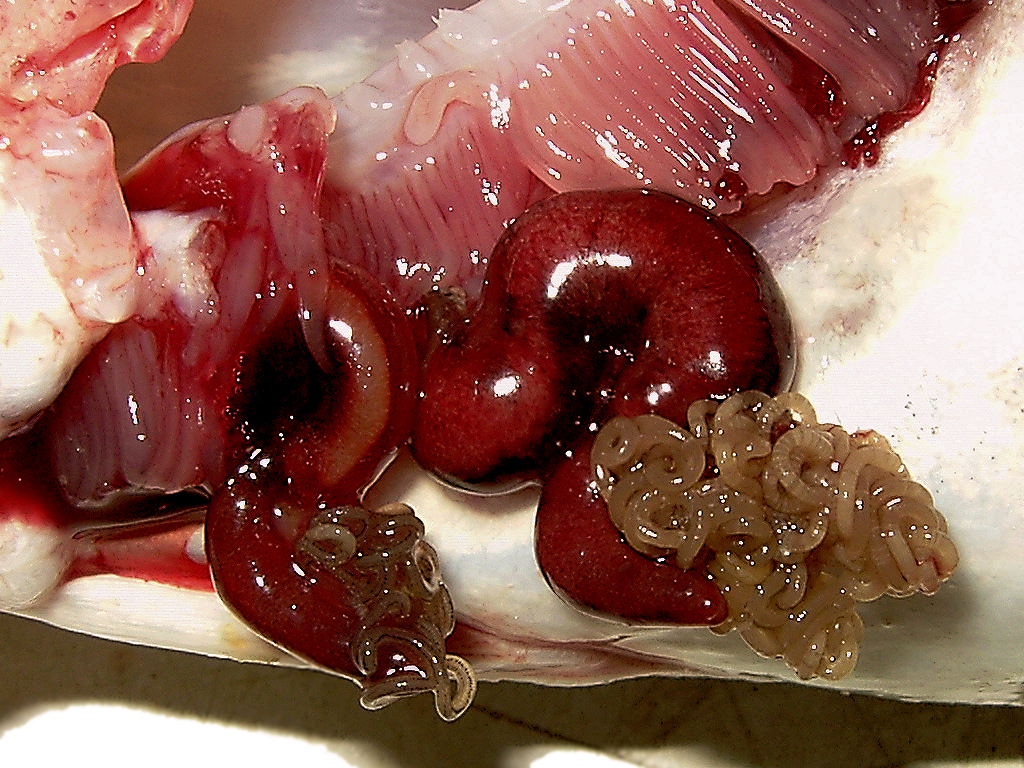
- Lernaeocera branchialis

Scientific classification
- Domain: Eukaryota
- Kingdom: Animalia
- Phylum: Arthropoda
- Class: Copepoda
- Order: Siphonostomatoida
- Family: Pennellidae
- Genus: Lernaeocera; Blainville, 1822

Synonyms
- Saucissona Leigh-Sharpe, 1935

= Lernaeocera =

Genus of crustaceans

Lernaeocera is a genus of marine copepods in the family Pennellidae.

== Species ==
The genus contains the following species:

- Lernaeocera abyssicola (Brady, 1883)
- Lernaeocera branchialis (Linnaeus, 1767)
- Lernaeocera esocina (Hermann, 1783)
- Lernaeocera lusci (Bassett-Smith, 1896)
- Lernaeocera minuta (T. Scott, 1900)
- Lernaeocera sauciatonis (Leigh-Sharpe, 1935)
