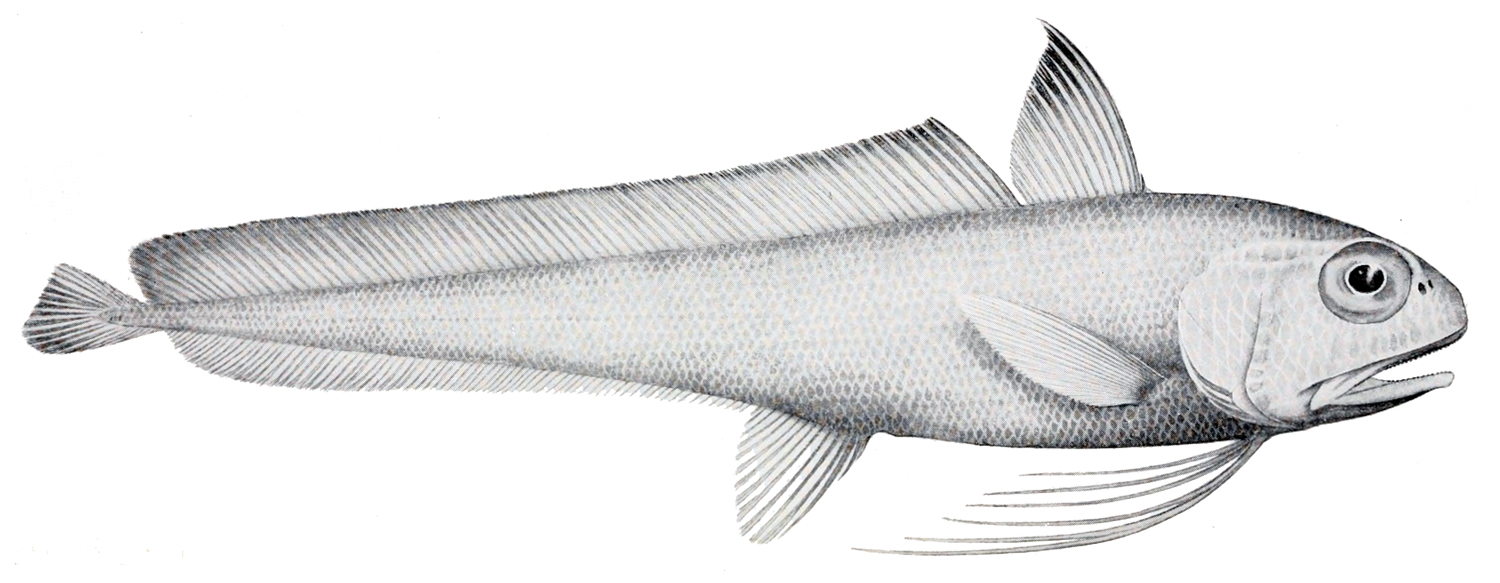

Scientific classification
- Kingdom: Animalia
- Phylum: Chordata
- Class: Actinopterygii
- Order: Gadiformes
- Suborder: Macrouroidei
- Family: Euclichthyidae; Cohen, 1984
- Genus: Euclichthys; McCulloch, 1926
- Species: E. polynemus

Binomial name
- Euclichthys polynemus McCulloch, 1926

= Eucla cod =

Species of fish

The Eucla cod (Euclichthys polynemus) is a deepwater marine fish belonging to the cod order (Gadiformes). It is the only species currently classified in the family Euclichthyidae. It is named after the town of Eucla, Western Australia, in whose coastal waters it is found.

The Eucla cod has a long and tapering body, a large mouth, and no chin barbel. It has two nearly contiguous dorsal fins; the first is short based and high, and the second is long-based, extending to the base of the caudal fin. It may grow up to 35 cm (14 in). It has been found in the Tasman Sea, around Australia from Queensland to the north Western Australian shelf and off the New Zealand shelf at depths of 250 to 920 m (820 to 3,020 ft). It has no commercial value.
