= East Siberian cod =

Scientific classification
- Kingdom: Animalia
- Phylum: Chordata
- Class: Actinopterygii
- Order: Gadiformes
- Family: Gadidae
- Genus: Arctogadus
- Species: A. borisovi

Binomial name
- Arctogadus borisovi Dryagin, 1932

Species of fish

The East Siberian cod (Arctogadus borisovi), also known as the toothed cod, is an Arctic fish closely similar to the Arctic cod Arctogadus glacialis and also related to true cods (genus Gadus). It has been differentiated in appearance from the Arctic cod by having pronounced chin barbel. Their sides and back are dark olive and the belly are light grey with dark spots. They may grow up to 60 cm.

Fishes attributed to East Siberian cod are found off the western half of the Canadian coast and the coasts of Siberia and also off northern and southern coasts of Greenland. The fish prefers living close to the sea floor at depths of 15 to 40 m, but it sometimes enters estuaries. They may also be found under pack ice. They are of little economic value.

Newer research, based on both morphological and mitochondrial DNA data, has however concluded that the East Siberian cod is not a distinct species from the Arctic cod, but the genus Arctogadus comprises just a single species i.e. the Arctic cod Arctogadus glacialis.
