= Fish and brewis =

Canadian dish

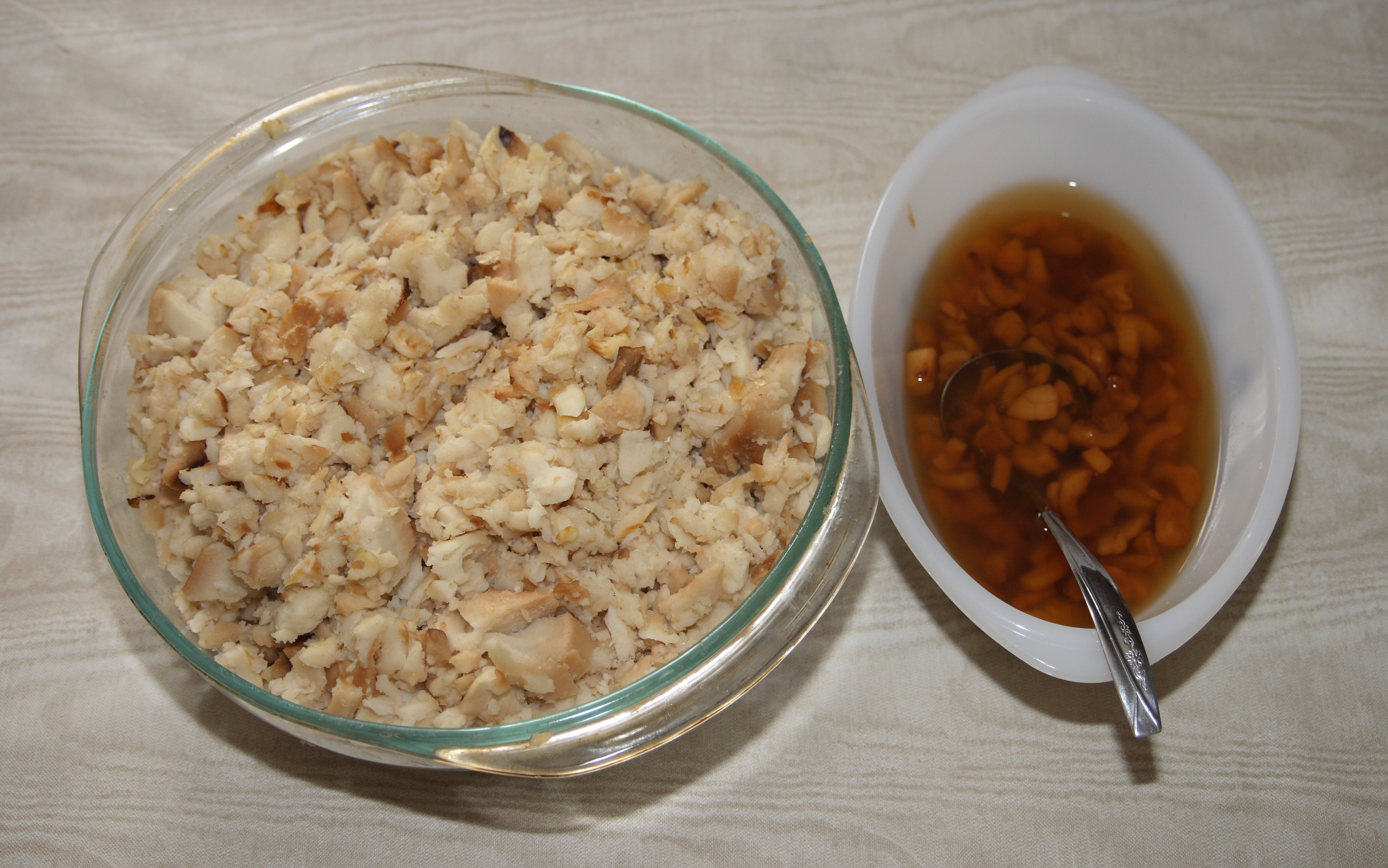
- Fish and brewis (left) with scrunchions (right)
- Place of origin: Newfoundland
- Main ingredients: Cod, hard tack

Fish and brewis (pronounced "brews") is a traditional Newfoundland meal consisting of cod and hard bread or hard tack. With the abundance of cod around the coasts of Newfoundland and Labrador it became synonymous with many Newfoundland households as a delicacy to be served as a main meal.

The recipe varies between communities and households, but the primary ingredients are always the same. The typical recipe calls for salt fish that is soaked in water overnight to reduce the salt content of the fish, and hard bread that is also soaked in water overnight. The next day, the fish and hard bread are boiled separately until tender, and then both are served together.

== Variations ==
The traditional meal is served with scrunchions, salted pork fat which has been cut into small pieces and fried. Both the rendered fat and the liquid fat are then drizzled over the fish and brewis.

Fisherman's brewis is the same as fish and brewis, but the fish and bread are chopped while hot and mixed together with the scrunchions, and often fresh cod is used instead of salt cod.

Drawn butter is sometimes used instead of scrunchions. Drawn butter in this instance is a mixture of melted butter and chopped onions that is thickened into a roux by adding flour in a saucepan, then served hot over the fish and hard bread.

In some Nova Scotia households, a similar dish is known as "salt cod and pork scraps", where the mixture can also be served on a plate next to a mound of plain boiled potatoes and carrots or turnip. The potatoes often substitute for the hard bread. Fresh chopped onion in vinegar is served as an accompaniment.

== History ==
The meal was originally developed by sailors who were often at sea for so long that few fresh ingredients were able to withstand such lengthy trips. Fish and brewis became a crew favorite. The idea that sailors called the hardtack or sea biscuit brewis (pronounced 'brews') because of their practice of bruising or breaking up the bread into bite-size pieces is a false etymology, and it has been argued more convincingly that the word "brewis" dates back to Middle English, originally referred to bread soaked in fat or dripping and is cognate with brose. A variant of brewis is found in Wales.
