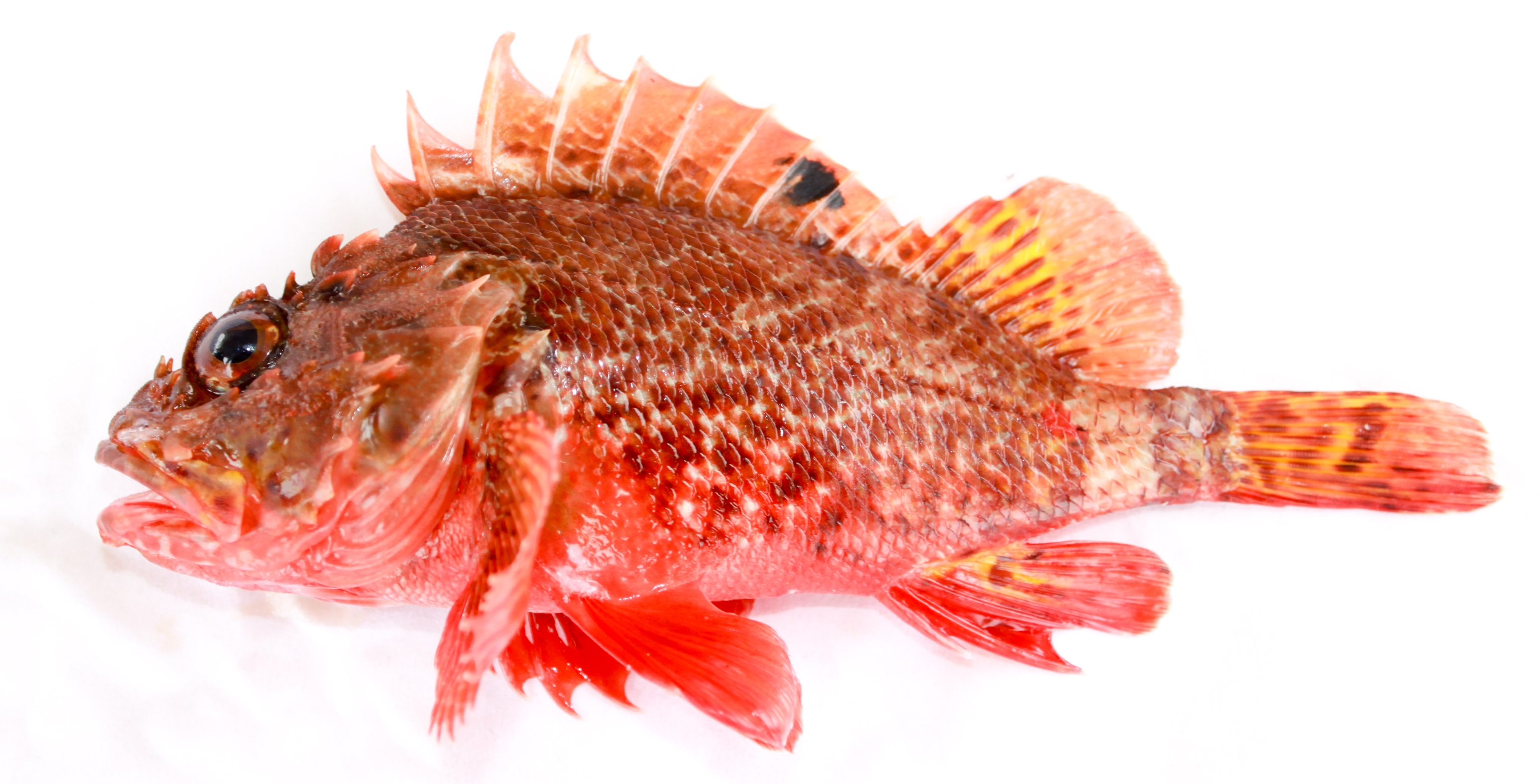

Scientific classification
- Kingdom: Animalia
- Phylum: Chordata
- Class: Actinopterygii
- Division: Teleostei
- Order: Perciformes
- Family: Scorpaenidae
- Genus: Scorpaena
- Species: S. papillosa

Binomial name
- Scorpaena papillosa (J. G. Schneider & J. R. Forster, 1801)

Synonyms
- Synanceia papillosus Schneider & Forster, 1801; Helicolenus papillosus (Schneider & Forster, 1801); Ruboralga ergastulorum (Richardson, 1842); Scorpaena ergastulorum Richardson, 1842; Scorpaena cruenta Solander, 1842; Scorpaena militaris Richardson, 1842

= Scorpaena papillosa =

Species of fish

Scorpaena papillosa, the red rock cod, Southern red scorpionfish, chained scorpionfish, common red gurnard, Southern red scorpioncod, Southern rockcod or dwarf scorpionfish, is a species of venomous marine ray-finned fish belonging to the family Scorpaenidae, the scorpionfishes.

== Taxonomy ==
Scorpaena papillosa was first formally described in 1801 as Synanceia papillosus by the German naturalists Johann Gottlob Schneider and Johann Reinhold Forster with the type locality given as Matatuahu Point on the Tāwharanui Peninsula in the Hauraki Gulf of North Auckland on the North Island of New Zealand. The specific name papillosa means "papilose", a reference to the tentacles on the pored cells along the lateral line.

=== Subspecies ===
Scorpaena papillosa is divided into 2 subspecies:

Image	Scientific name	Common name	Distribution
	S.p. papillosa (Schneider & Forster, 1801)	Dwarf scorpionfish	New Zealand
	S.p. ergastularum Richardson, 1842	Southern red scorpionfish	southeastern Australia

== Description ==
Scorpaena papillosa grows to a maximum length of approximately 30 cm. Its large mouth contains small, thin teeth that form velvety bands (villiform). It has 12 dorsal spines, 9 to 10 dorsal soft rays, 3 anal spines, 5 anal soft rays, a small row of spines beneath the eyes, and a gill cover margin containing 3 spines.

== Distribution ==
This species is found in the Indo-West Pacific, in New Zealand and southern Australia.

== Habitat ==
Scorpaena papillosa lives in marine, demersal, temperate waters, at depths of 5–50 metres (16–164 ft). It can be found on rocky bottoms, in shallow estuaries, in muddy waters as well as other environments, such as in offshore kelp beds and shallow seagrass beds. Juveniles of this species are sometimes found in large rock pools.

== Diet ==
This fish feeds on many different invertebrates, including crustaceans. It also eats other fish.
