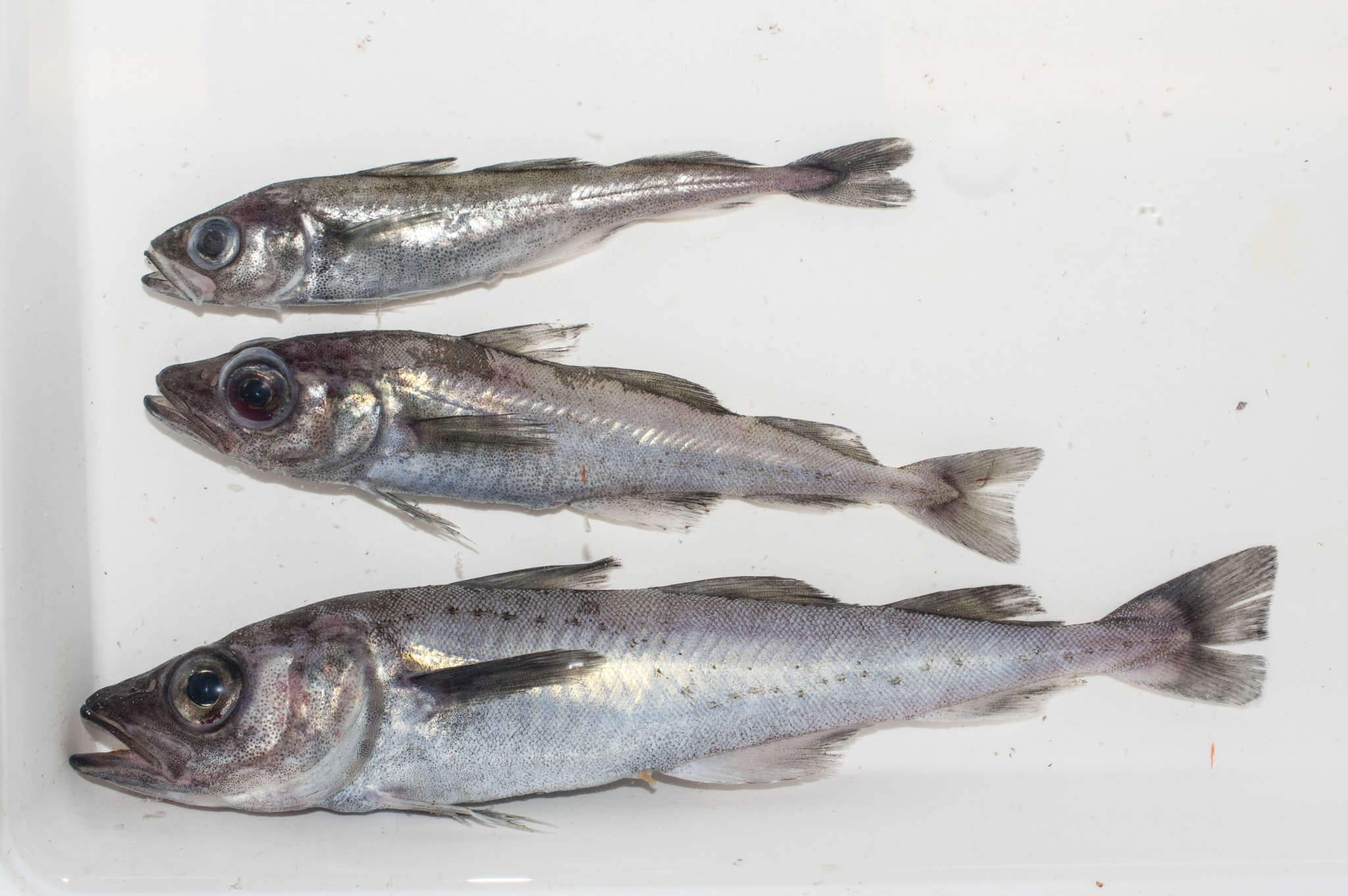

Scientific classification
- Kingdom: Animalia
- Phylum: Chordata
- Class: Actinopterygii
- Division: Teleostei
- Order: Gadiformes
- Family: Gadidae
- Genus: Arctogadus; Dryagin, 1932
- Species: A. glacialis

Binomial name
- Arctogadus glacialis (W. K. H. Peters, 1872)

Synonyms
- Arctogadus borisovi Dryagin, 1932; Gadus glacialis W. K. H. Peters, 1872; Phocaegadus megalops Jensen, 1948

= Arctogadus =

Genus of fishes

Arctogadus glacialis, known also with ambiguous common names Arctic cod and polar cod, is an Arctic species of fish in the cod family Gadidae, related to the true cod (genus Gadus). Arctogadus glacialis is found in icy water. They grow to about 30 cm long, and are favorite food of narwhals and other arctic whales.

== Common names and taxonomy ==
The common names "Arctic cod" and "polar cod" can refer to either Arctogadus glacialis or Boreogadus saida, and "Arctic cod" may also refer to Eleginus nawaga.

Another Arctic gadid, the East Siberian cod (Arctogadus borisovi), was until recently considered the closest relative of A. glacialis. It has, however, been found not to be distinct from A. glacialis, and should be included in this species. According to this result, Arctogadus is a monotypic genus. However, Arctogadus is a close relative of Boreogadus, and should perhaps be included in that genus.

== Appearance ==
Arctic cod have been cited to grow up to 32.5 cm (12.8 in) in total length. It has been distinguished from other cod species by its lack of the chin barbel. Populations of Arctic cod previously referred to the East Siberian cod however do have a chin barbel and grow up to 50–60 cm length.

== Distribution ==
The Arctic cod is widely distributed in the western part of the Arctic basin and the northwest and northeast coasts of Greenland. Its range is between 85° and 72°N latitude. Arctic cod can be found at depths of up to 1000 m, and frequently under ice.

Fish earlier attributed to the East Siberian cod are found off the western half of the coast of Canada and the coasts of Siberia and also off the northern and southern coasts of Greenland. The fish lives close to the sea floor at depths of 15 to 40 m, but it sometimes enters estuaries, and may also be found under pack ice.

The species is of minor commercial value.

== Diet ==
A. glacialis in an ice-free area off northeastern Greenland were found to feed almost exclusively on pelagic prey (primarily copepods, amphipods, and mysids).
