= Scrod =

Small cod or haddock used as food

- Alternative names: Schrod
- Type: Fish
- Region or state: New England and Atlantic Canada
- Main ingredients: Cod or haddock
- Ingredients generally used: Other whitefish

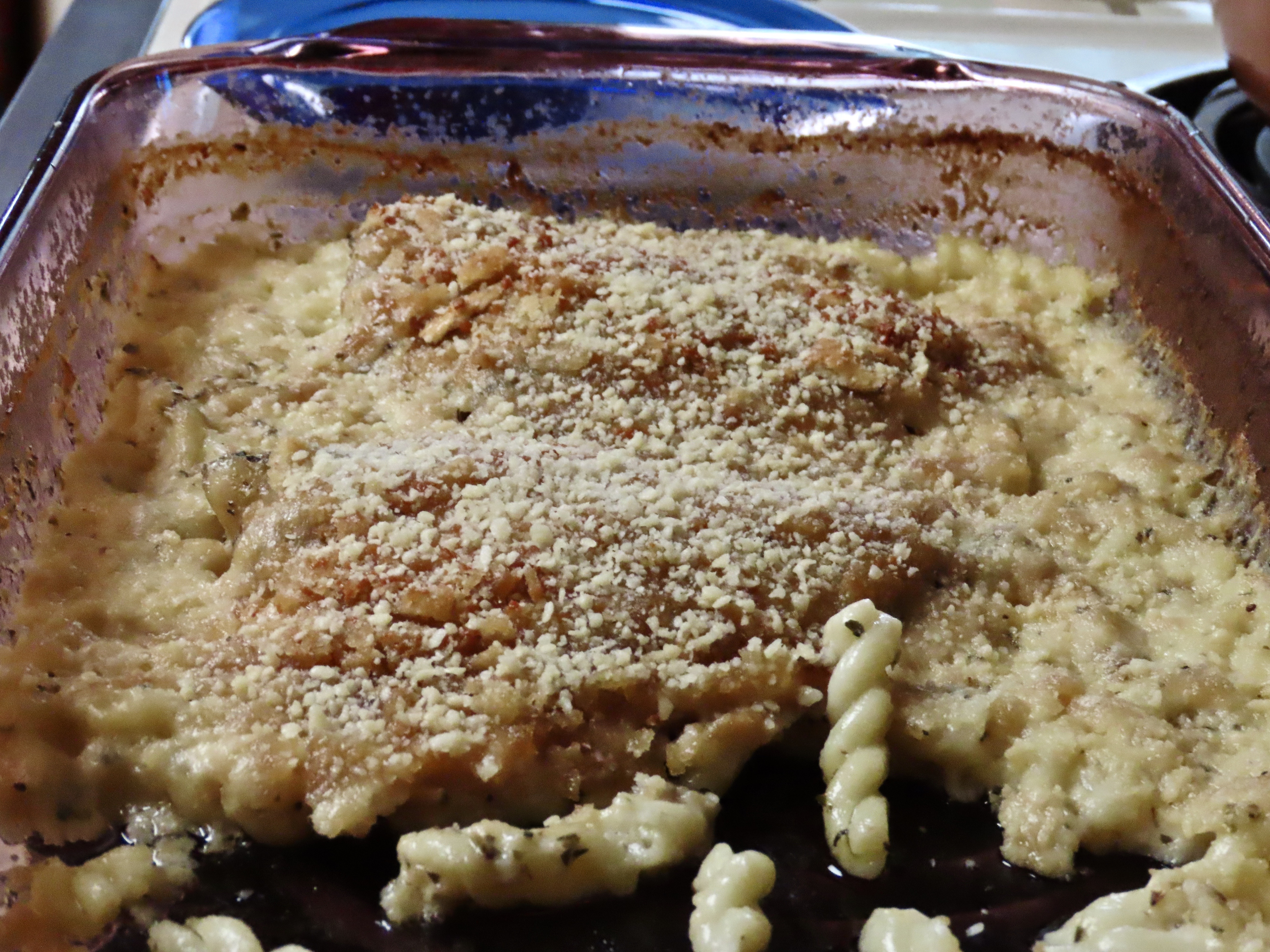
Baked scrod

Scrod or schrod (/ˈskrɒd/) is a small cod or haddock, and sometimes other whitefish, used as food. It is usually served as a fillet, though formerly it was often split instead.

In the wholesale fish business, scrod is the smallest weight category of the major whitefish. From smallest to largest, the categories are scrod, market, large, and whale. In the United States, scrod haddock or cusk weighs 1 1/2–3 pounds (0.7–1.4 kg); scrod cod 1 1/2–2 1/2 lb (0.7–1.1 kg); and scrod pollock 1 1/2–4 lb (0.7–1.8 kg). The exact weight categories are somewhat different in Canada.

Scrod is common in many coastal New England and Atlantic Canadian fish markets and restaurants, although using the name 'scrod' without the species is in principle mislabeling.

Historically, scrod was simply a small cod or haddock, "too small to swallow a bait" or "too small to be filleted", which was usually prepared by being split and lightly salted ("corned"), and sometimes quickly air-dried. They were generally broiled and served with butter. Starting in the mid-20th century, it came to mean a small haddock or cod that is filleted or split.

== Etymology ==
The term "scrod" for a method of preparing fish, rather than a type or size of fish, is first attested in 1841. It is from the Anglo-Cornish dialect word scraw:

Fish are scrawed when they are prepared in a particular way before cooking. This scrawing consists in cutting them flatly open and then slightly powdering them with salt and sometimes with pepper. They are then exposed to the sun or air, that as much as possible of the moisture may be dried up. In this state they are roasted over a clear burning coal or wood fire. Thus prepared and smeared over with a little butter they are said to be 'scrawed'.

A similar meaning is found in Scots scrae: "fish dried in the sun without being salted", attested in 1806.

This corresponds to its earliest documented meaning in American English: "a young or small cod fish, split and salted for cooking".

Another theory derives it from the Dutch schrood, from Middle Dutch schrode 'a piece cut off', that is, cut up for drying or cooking. There is a rare variant escrod.

=== Folklore ===
The term has been credited to the Parker House Hotel in Boston.

The term has attracted a number of jocular false etymologies. One treats it as short for the "Sacred Cod" carving that hangs in the Boston State House." Various acronyms have been suggested, though acronyms were hardly ever used in the past: "seaman’s catch received on deck," supposedly any whitefish of the day; for "small cod remaining on dock"; "select catch retrieved on [the] day."

Scrod was apparently often used to mean simply fresh fish of the day, since menus were made up before the day's catch was brought in.

== Cuisine ==
Broiled Scrod
A young cod, split down the back, and backbone removed, except a small portion near the tail, is called a scrod. Scrod are always broiled, spread with butter, and sprinkled with salt and pepper. Haddock is also so dressed.

— Fannie Merritt Farmer,
The Boston Cooking-School Cook Book, 1896

Historically, scrod was as much a method of preparation as a kind of fish. An 1851 recipe calls for the fish to be salted and left overnight, then broiled, skin side down first.

Today, scrod is cooked in a variety of ways, including frying or broiling, after splitting or filleting; for example, "in famous Boston restaurants, scrod is simply a tail piece of filleted haddock or cod dipped in oil, then bread crumbs and broiled [sic] in a moderate oven" (1949).

As of the early years of the new millennium, scrod continues as a staple in many coastal New England and Atlantic Canadian fish markets and restaurants.

== In literature and history ==
Seth Peterson, a boatman, fisherman, and friend of Daniel Webster, described the 19th century orator and statesman (per biographer George Curtis) as having greatly enjoyed scrawed cod:

He loved codfish best—he liked to have them scrawed—to have them split open, corned a little over night, and broiled for breakfast. I've fixed him more than a thousand.

"Scrod" has been used as a facetious past participle of the word "screw," slang for having sexual intercourse, since at least the 1960s, in jokes like "I got scrod in Boston."
