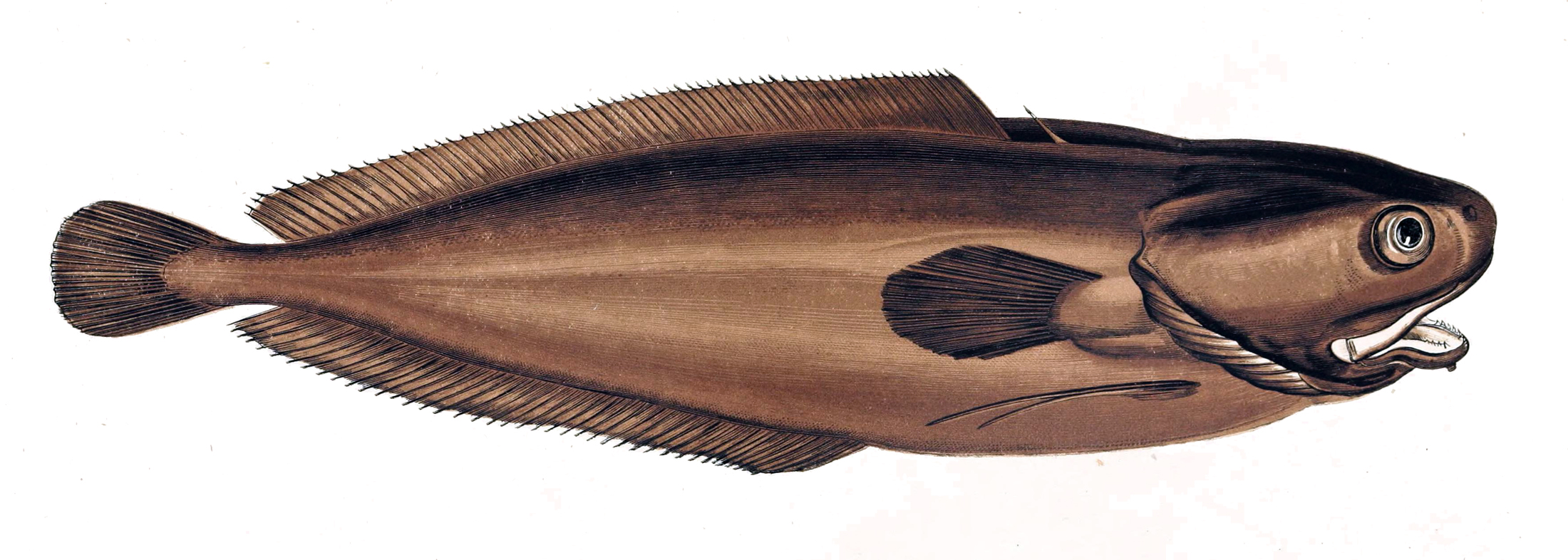

Conservation status
- Least Concern (IUCN 3.1)

Scientific classification
- Kingdom: Animalia
- Phylum: Chordata
- Class: Actinopterygii
- Division: Teleostei
- Order: Gadiformes
- Suborder: Ranicipitoidei
- Family: Ranicipitidae; Bonaparte, 1835
- Genus: Raniceps; Oken, 1817
- Species: R. raninus

Binomial name
- Raniceps raninus (Linnaeus, 1758)

Synonyms
- Blennius raninus Linnaeus, 1758; Gadus raninus (Linnaeus, 1758); Phycis ranina (Linnaeus, 1758); Cottus grunniens Linnaeus, 1758; Blennius fuscus Müller, 1776; Gadus fuliginosus Walbaum, 1784; Gadus trifurcus Walbaum, 1792; Gadus minimus Walbaum, 1792; Batrachoides blennioides Lacépède, 1800; Batrachocephalus blennioides (Lacepède, 1800); Blennius trifurcatus Shaw, 1803; Raniceps trifurcatus (Shaw, 1803); Raniceps jago Fleming, 1828; Raniceps niger Nilsson, 1832; Raniceps fuscus Krøyer, 1843

= Raniceps raninus =

Species of fish

Raniceps raninus, the tadpole fish, is a species of gadiform fish native to the northeast Atlantic Ocean around the coasts of France, Ireland, and the United Kingdom and the North Sea. It is the only member of the genus Raniceps, the family Ranicipitidae and the suborder Ranicipitoidei. It was formerly placed in the family Gadidae, but phylogenetic studies support it belonging to a distinct family.

This species grows to a total length of 27.5 cm (10.8 in). It is of no importance to the commercial fishery industry, though it can be found in the aquarium trade and is displayed in public aquaria.
