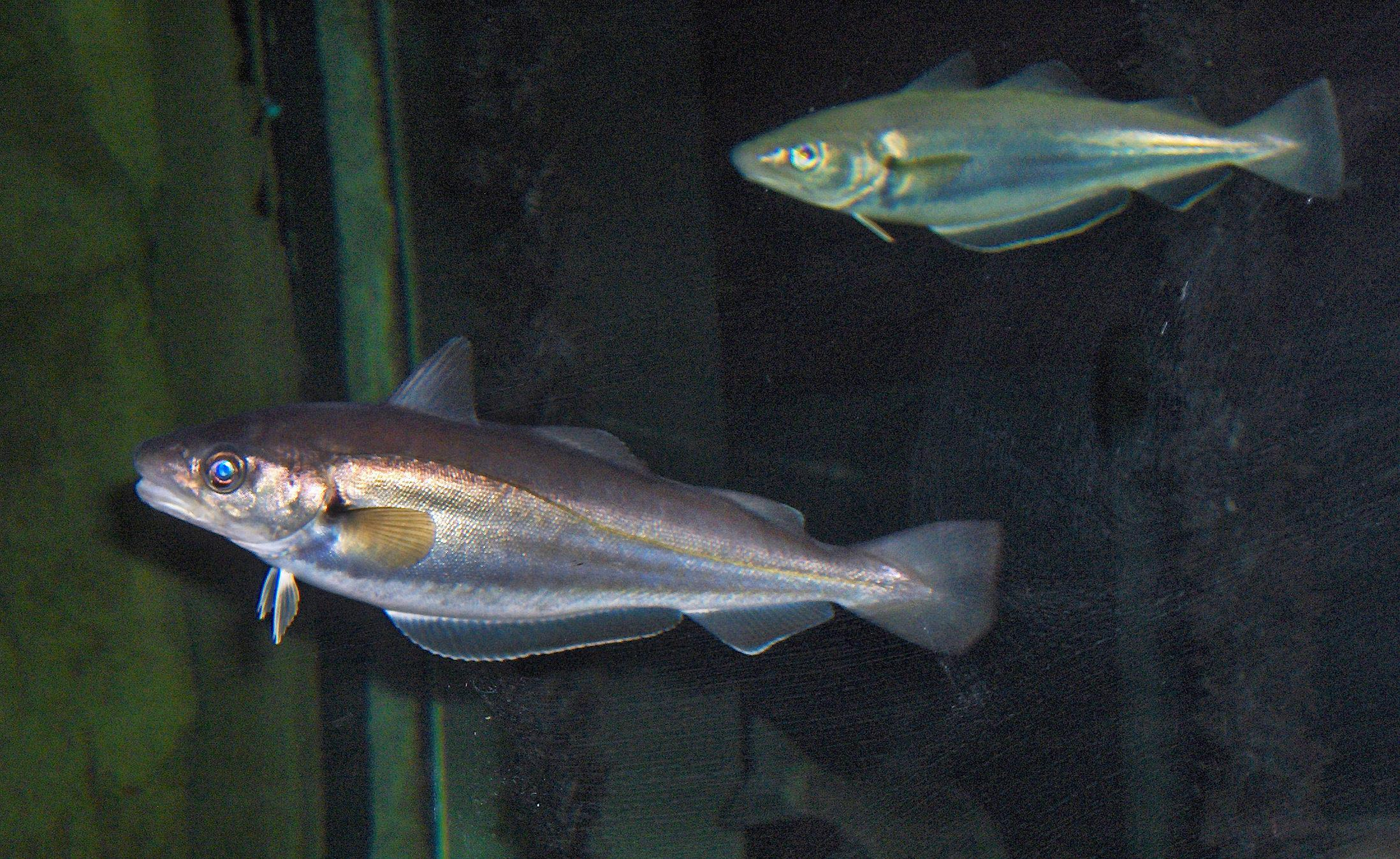

Conservation status
- Least Concern (IUCN 3.1)

Scientific classification
- Kingdom: Animalia
- Phylum: Chordata
- Class: Actinopterygii
- Division: Teleostei
- Order: Gadiformes
- Family: Gadidae
- Genus: Merlangius; Garsault, 1764
- Species: M. merlangus

Binomial name
- Merlangius merlangus (Linnaeus, 1758)

Synonyms
- Gadus merlangus Linnaeus, 1758; Odontogadus merlangus (Linnaeus, 1758); Merlangus vulgaris Fleming, 1828; Gadus euxinus Nordmann, 1840; Merlangus linnei Malm, 1877

= Merlangius =

Merlangius merlangus

Species of fish

Merlangius merlangus, commonly known as whiting or merling, is an important food fish in the eastern North Atlantic Ocean and the northern Mediterranean, western Baltic, and Black Sea. In Anglophonic countries outside the whiting's natural range, the name "whiting" has been applied to various other species of fish.

== Description ==
Merlangius merlangus has three dorsal fins with a total of 30 to 40 soft rays and two anal fins with 30 to 35 soft rays. The body is long and the head small and a chin barbel, if present, is very small. This fish can reach a maximum length of about 70 centimetres (27 1/2 inches). The colour may be yellowish-brown, greenish or dark blue, the flanks yellowish grey or white and the belly silvery. There is a distinctive black blotch near the base of each pectoral fin.

== Distribution and habitat ==
Whiting are native to the northeastern Atlantic Ocean. Their range extends from the southeastern Barents Sea and Iceland to Scandinavia, the Baltic Sea, the North Sea, Portugal, the Black Sea, the Aegean Sea, the Adriatic Sea and parts of the Mediterranean Sea. They occur on sand, mud and gravel seabeds at depths down to about 100 metres (300 feet; 50 fathoms).

In 2014, their conservation status was classified as vulnerable in the Baltic Sea.

== Human use ==
Until the late 20th century, whiting was a cheap fish, regarded as food for the poor or for pets. Whiting can be damaged in the industrial trawling and gutting process, losing the sheen of its scales or damaging the delicate flesh; angling outside of spawning season is preferable to preserve these features.

In France, fried whiting (merlan) is traditionally served with its tail in its mouth on a bed of fried parsley, called merlan en colère, or 'angry whiting'. French wigmakers were called merlan due to the flouring of whiting resembling the powdering of wigs.

The other fish that have been given the name whiting are mostly also edible fish. Several species of the drum, or croaker, family (Sciaenidae) are also called whiting, among them the northern kingfish (Menticirrhus saxatilis).

== Parasites ==
Whiting and related other Gadidae species are plagued by parasites. These include the cod worm (Lernaeocera branchialis), a copepod crustacean that clings to the gills of the fish and metamorphoses into a plump, sinusoidal, wormlike body, with a coiled mass of egg strings at the rear.
