= Smoke (disambiguation) =

Smoke is a cloud of particles suspended in the air. The term may also refer to:

== Places ==
- Mountain of Smoke (Arabic: جبل الدخان, Jabal ad Dukhan), a hill in Bahrain
- Smoke Lake (disambiguation), various lakes in Canada and the USA
- "The Smoke", a nickname for London

== People ==
- Smoke (surname), a list of people
- John Smoke Johnson (1792–1886), a Mohawk leader in Canada, also known as Smoke Johnson
- Smoke Laval (born 1955), American college baseball coach
- Sayenqueraghta (c. 1707–1786), Seneca war chief nicknamed "Old Smoke"
- Old Chief Smoke (1774–1864), an original Oglala Sioux head chief
- Tony Stewart (born 1971), American auto racer nicknamed "Smoke"

== Arts and entertainment ==
=== Characters ===
- Smoke (comics), in the Marvel Comics universe
- Smoke (Mortal Kombat), from the Mortal Kombat video game franchise

=== Films ===
- Smoke (film), a 1995 American independent film
- The Smoke (film), a 2014 British crime thriller

=== Television ===
- The Smoke (TV series), a 2014 British drama series concerning firefighters in London
- "Smoke" (Better Call Saul), a 2018 episode of the television series Better Call Saul
- Smoke (TV series), a 2025 Apple TV+ crime drama miniseries concerning fire investigators

=== Literature ===
- Smoke (Turgenev novel), an 1867 novel by Ivan Turgenev
- Smoke (Miscione novel), a 2004 novel by Lisa Miscione

=== Music ===
==== Groups ====
- Smoke (American band), a 1990s band based in Atlanta, Georgia
- The Smoke, a pop band from York from the 1960s and 1970s

==== Albums ====
- Smoke (Alexander von Schlippenbach and Sunny Murray album), 1990
- Smoke (Izzy Stradlin album), 2009
- Smoke (Lisa Lois album), 2009
- Smoke (Paul Kelly album), 1999
- Smoke (White Williams album), 2007

==== Songs ====
- "Smoke" (Eskimo Joe song), 2004
- "Smoke" (Natalie Imbruglia song), 1998
- "Smoke" (A Thousand Horses song), 2015
- "Smoke" (50 Cent song), a 2014 song featuring Trey Songz
- "Smoke" (Zach McPhee song) from Feels Country to Me, 2024
- "Smoke", by Ben Folds Five from Whatever and Ever Amen, 1997
- "Smoke", by Caroline Polachek from Desire, I Want To Turn Into You, 2023
- "Smoke", by Crash Vegas from Red Earth, 1989
- "Smoke", by Don Toliver from Life of a Don, 2021
- "Smoke", by Jaehyun from J, 2024
- "Smoke", by Liz Phair from Funstyle, 2010
- "Smoke", by Mary J. Blige from Growing Pains, 2007
- "Smoke", by Pvris from White Noise, 2012
- "Smoke", by Victoria Monét featuring Lucky Daye from Jaguar II, 2023
- "Smoke! Smoke! Smoke! (That Cigarette)", a Western swing novelty song, 1947
- "SMOKE (False Devils)", by Wolves at the Gate from Wasteland, 2025
- "The Smoke", by Amorphis from Eclipse, 2006

=== Other ===
- Smoke (1/3), a sculpture by Tony Smith
- Ad-Dukhan ("Smoke"), the 44th chapter (sura) of the Quran

== Computing and technology ==
- Smoke (software), an editing and effects software for the arts, media and entertainment industry
- Autodesk Smoke

== Sports ==
- Asheville Smoke, a United Hockey League team from 1998 to 2000, based in Asheville, North Carolina, USA
- Brantford Smoke, a Colonial Hockey League, later United Hockey League team from 1991 to 1998, based in Brantford, Ontario, Canada, before relocating to Asheville

== Other uses ==
- Smoke (jazz club), a jazz club in Manhattan, New York
- Smoke, slang for a cigarette
- Smoke, historic derogatory slang for Negro
- Smoke, slang verb meaning "to murder" or "to beat" in a competition
- Smoke Squadron, popular name of the Brazilian Air Force's air demonstration squadron
- Smoke, a fur color for cats
- Smoke (donkey), a mascot and therapy animal for the United States Marine Corps during the Iraq War

== See also ==
- Smokie (disambiguation)
- Smoking (disambiguation)
- Smoky (disambiguation), including uses of Smokey
- Smoke's Poutinerie
