= Smoked fish =

Fish that has been cured by smoking

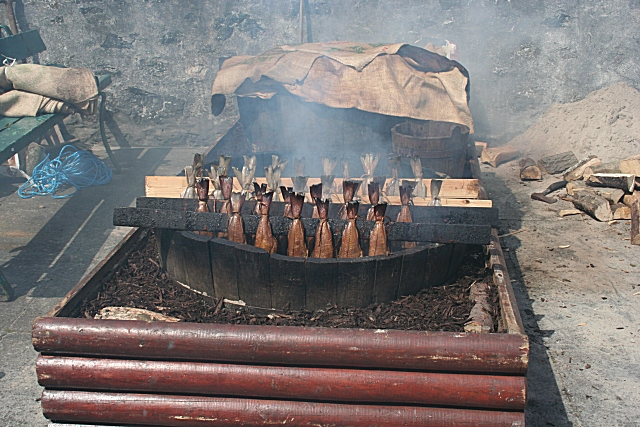
Racks of haddock in a homemade smoker to make Arbroath smokies. Smouldering at the bottom are hardwood wood chips. The sacking at the back is used to cover the racks while they are smoked.

Smoked fish is fish that has been cured by smoking. Foods have been smoked by humans throughout history. Originally this was done as a preservative. In more recent times, fish is readily preserved by refrigeration and freezing and the smoking of fish is generally done for the unique taste and flavour imparted by the smoking process.

== Smoking process ==
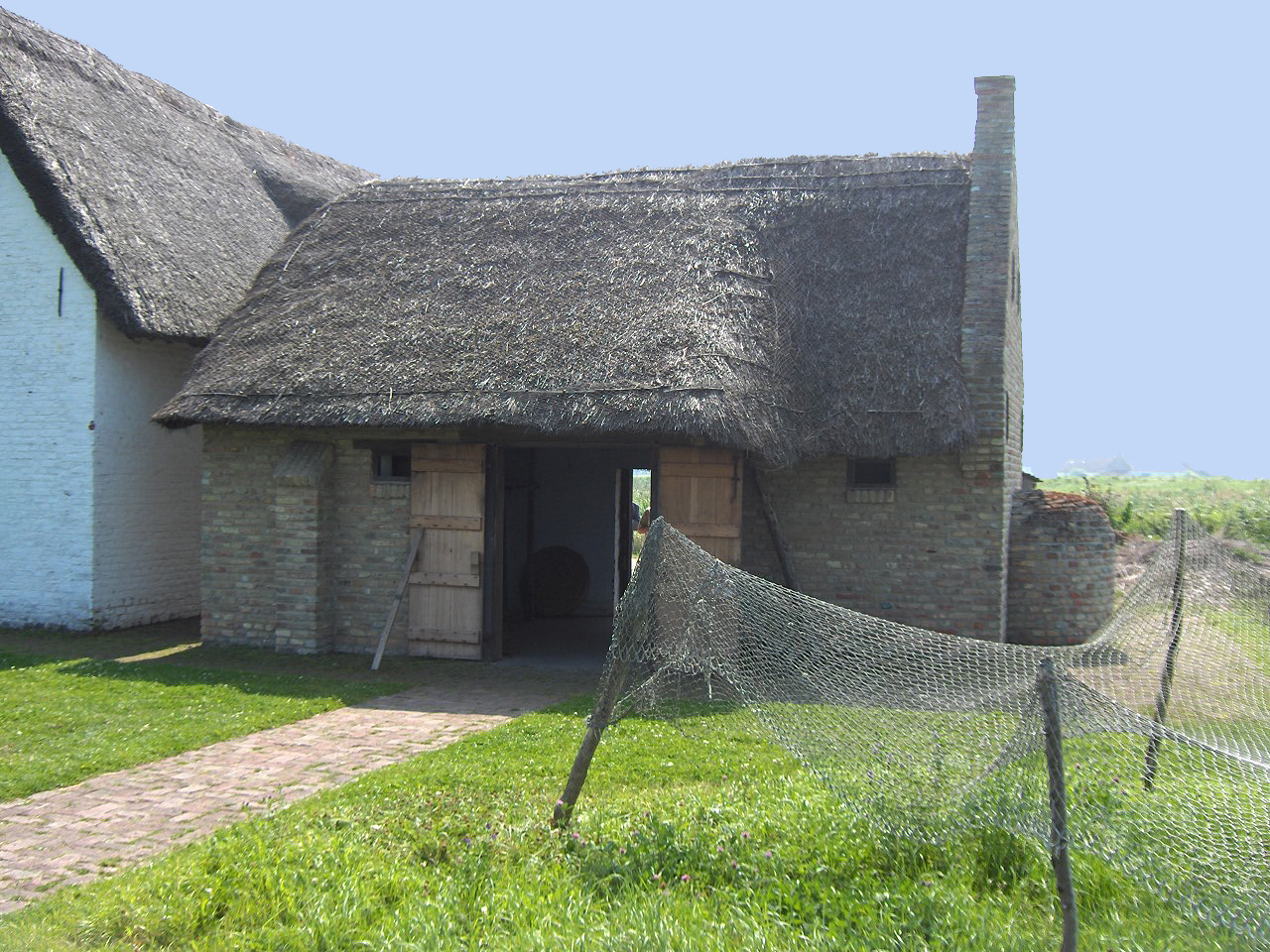
Medieval smokehouse, ca. 1465, at the archaeological site of Walraversijde, a fishing village on the coast of Belgium

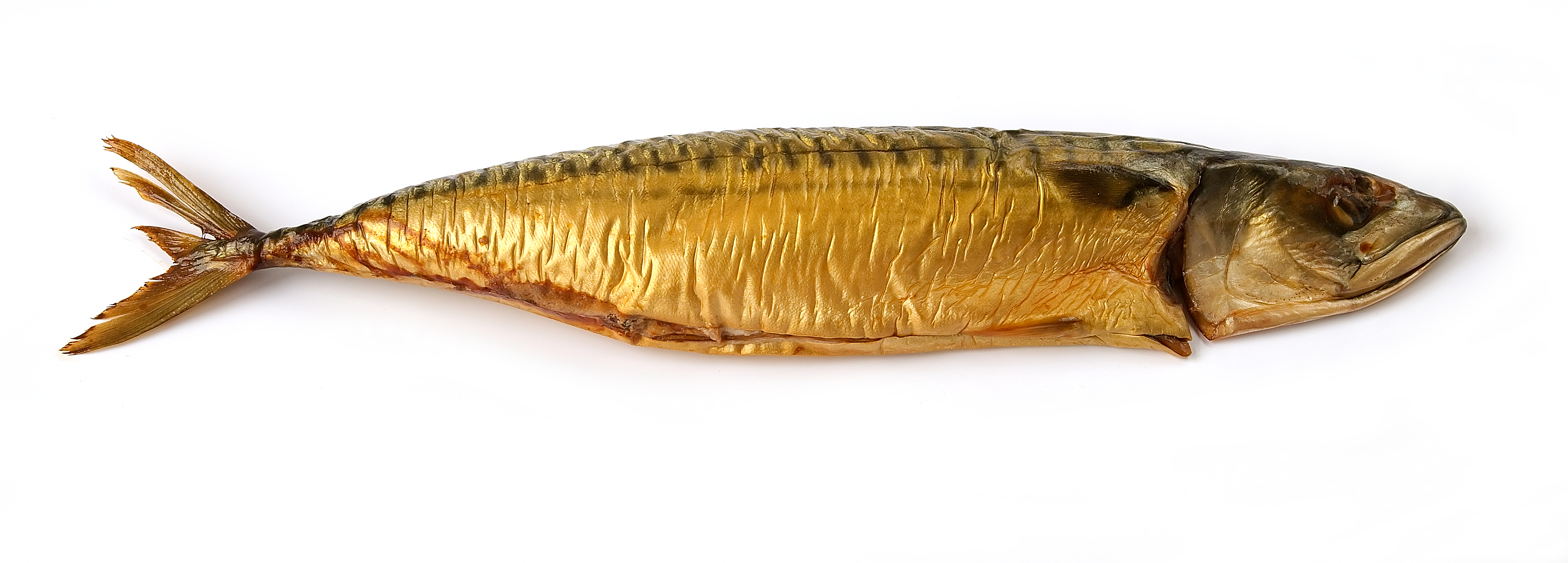
A smoked Atlantic mackerel

According to Jeffrey J. Rozum, "The process of smoking fish occurs through the use of fire. Wood contains three major components that are broken down in the burning process to form smoke. The burning process is called pyrolysis, which is simply defined as the chemical decomposition by heat. The major wood components are cellulose, hemicellulose and lignin."

"The major steps in the preparation of smoked fish are salting (bath or injection of liquid brine or dry salt mixture), cold smoking, cooling, packaging (air/vacuum or modified), and storage. Smoking, one of the oldest preservation methods, combines the effects of salting, drying, heating and smoking. Typical smoking of fish is either cold (28–32 °C) or hot (70–80 °C). Cold smoking does not cook the flesh, coagulate the proteins, inactivate food spoilage enzymes, or eliminate the food pathogens, and hence refrigerated storage is necessary until consumption.

=== Smokehouses ===
A smokehouse is a building where fish or meat is cured with smoke. In a traditional fishing village, a smokehouse was often attached to a fisherman's cottage. The smoked products might be stored in the building, sometimes for a year or more. Traditional smokehouses served both as smokers and to store the smoked fish. Fish could be preserved if it was cured with salt and cold smoked for two weeks or longer. Smokehouses were often secured to prevent animals and thieves from accessing the food.

=== Traditional versus mechanical ===
Today there are two main methods of smoking fish: the traditional method and the mechanical method. The traditional method involves the fish being suspended in smokehouses over slowly smouldering wood shavings. The fish are left overnight to be naturally infused with smoke.

In the mechanical method smoke is generated through the use of smoke condensates, which are created by the industrial process of turning smoke into a solid or liquid form. The flow of smoke in the mechanical kiln is computer controlled and the fish generally spend less time being smoked than in a traditional kiln.

Laminar air-flow technology allows mechanical kilns to achieve a higher production rate, while the use of micro-processors has allowed mechanical kiln smokers increased sensor coverage within the kiln.

High-quality smoked fish is a high-end product sought after by restaurants.

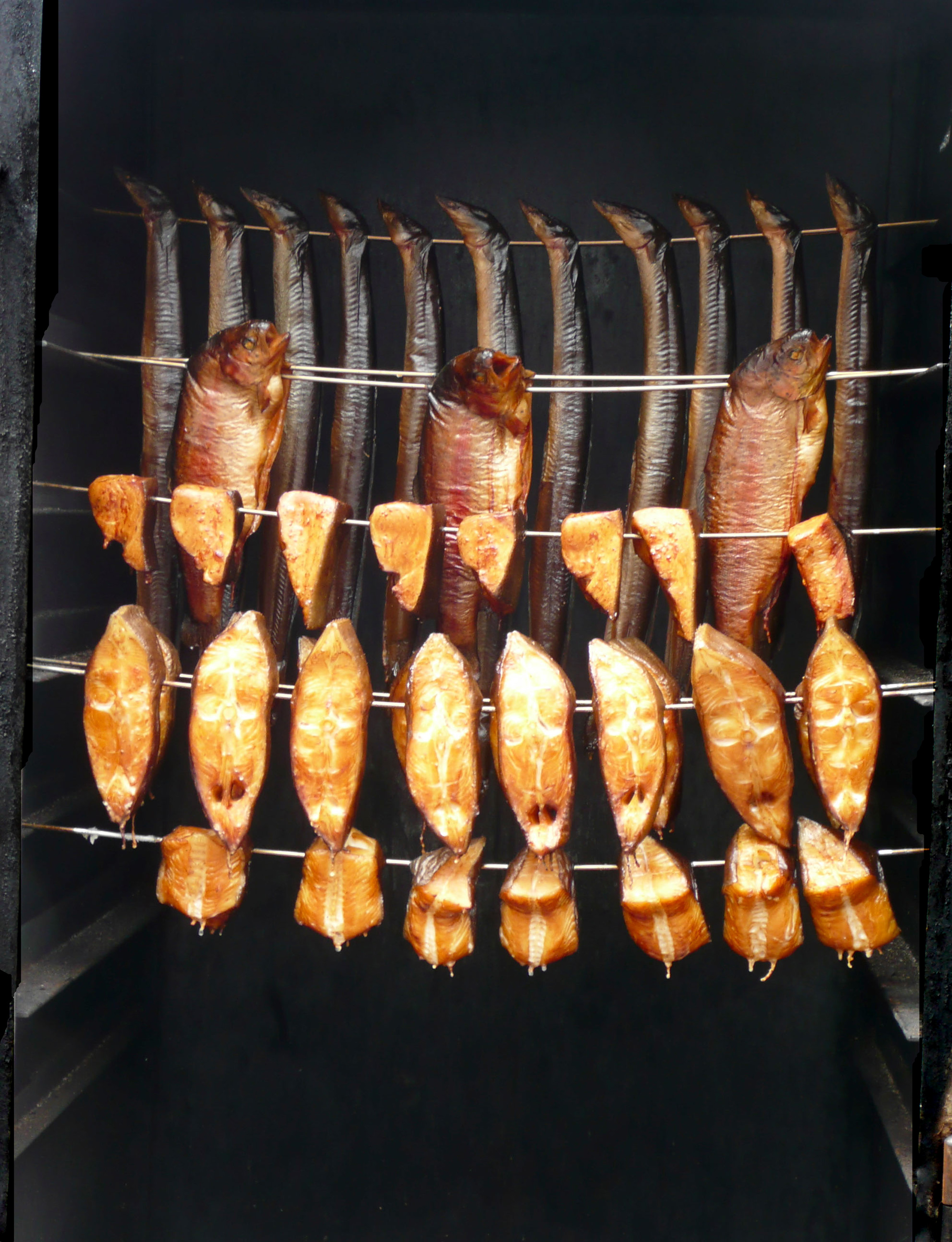
Smoked fish in smoker

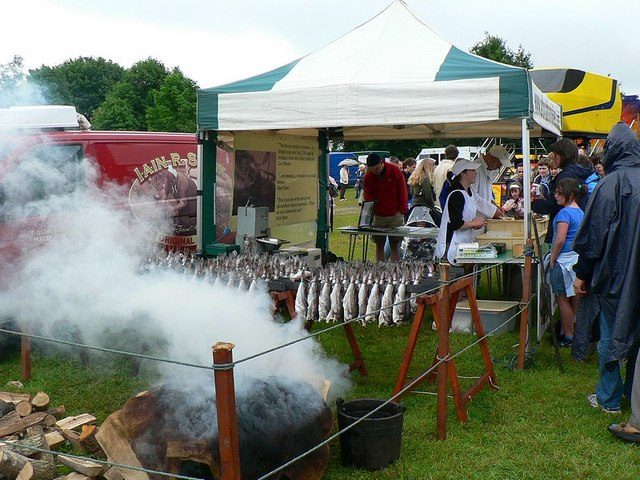
Smoking fish at the highland games

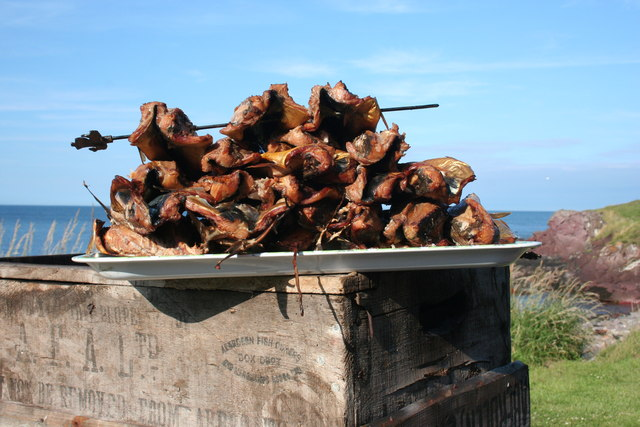
Mackerel cold-smoked for eight hours and then hot-smoked for an hour in a homemade smoker

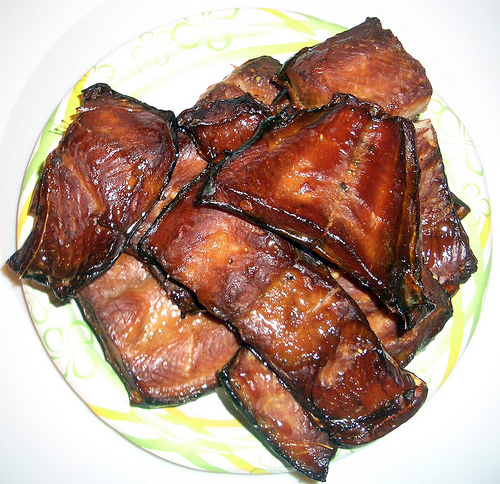
Smoked salmon

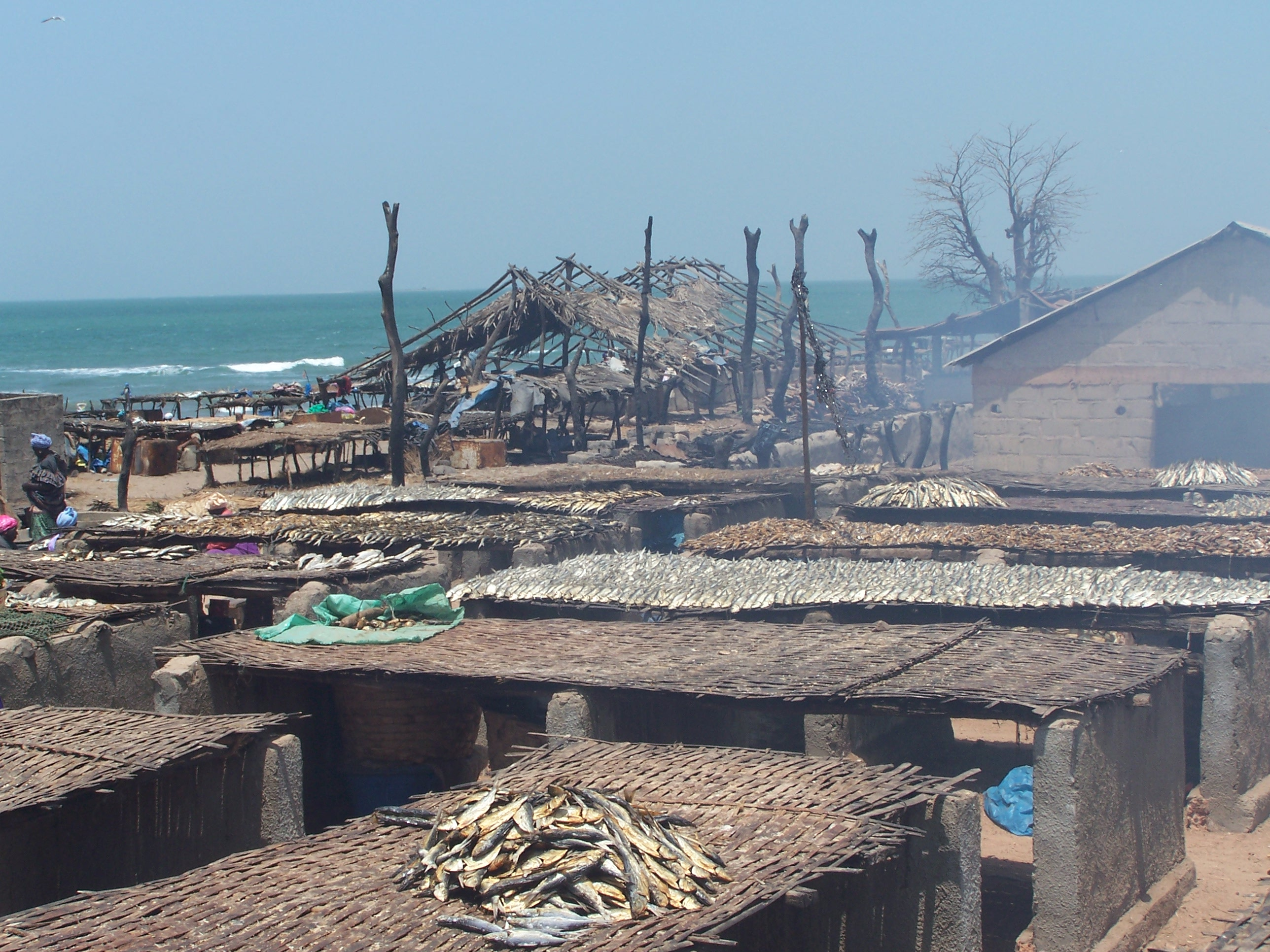
Fish being smoked in Tanji, The Gambia

== Types ==
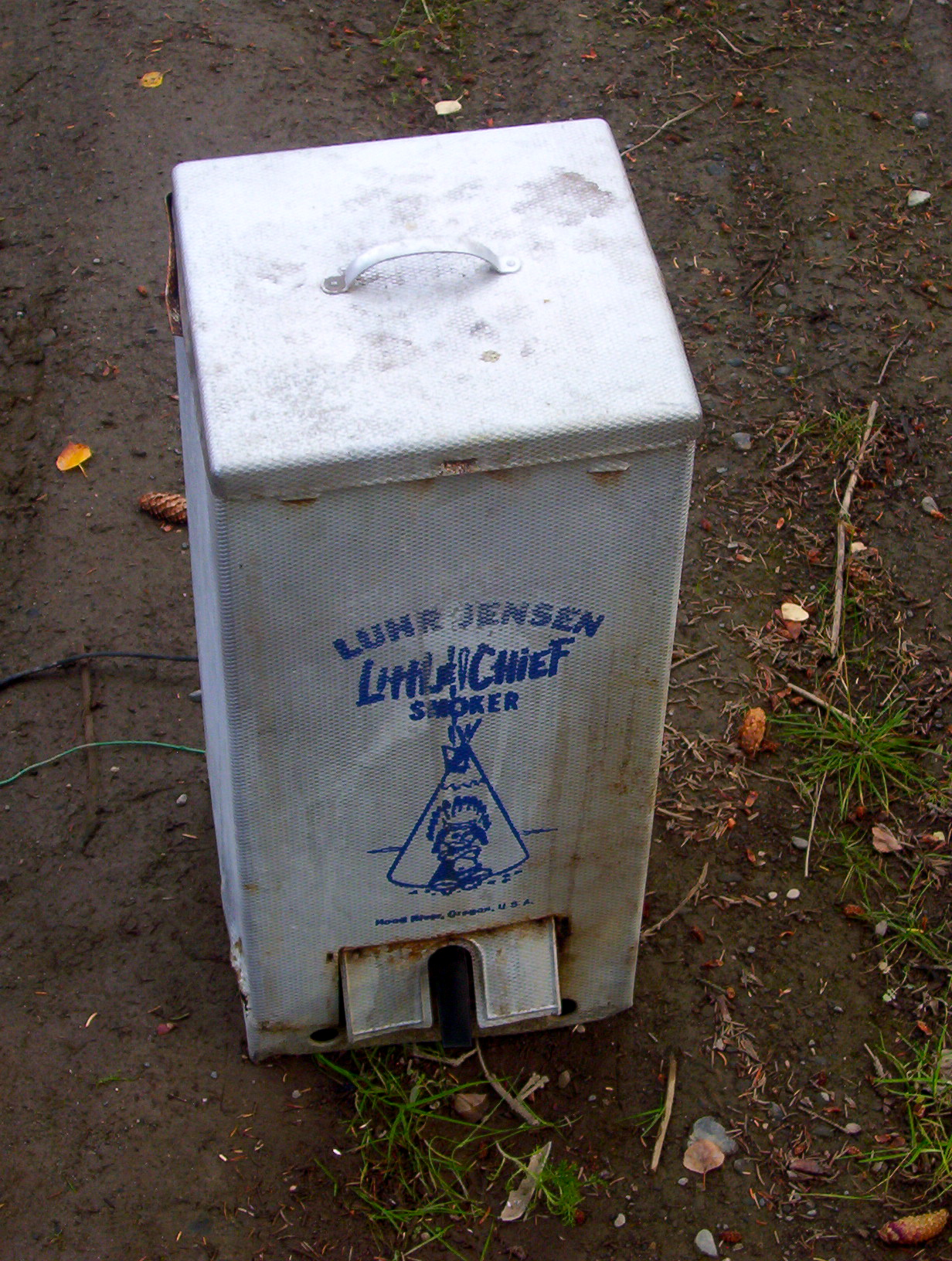
Home smokers are often in the form of metal boxes.

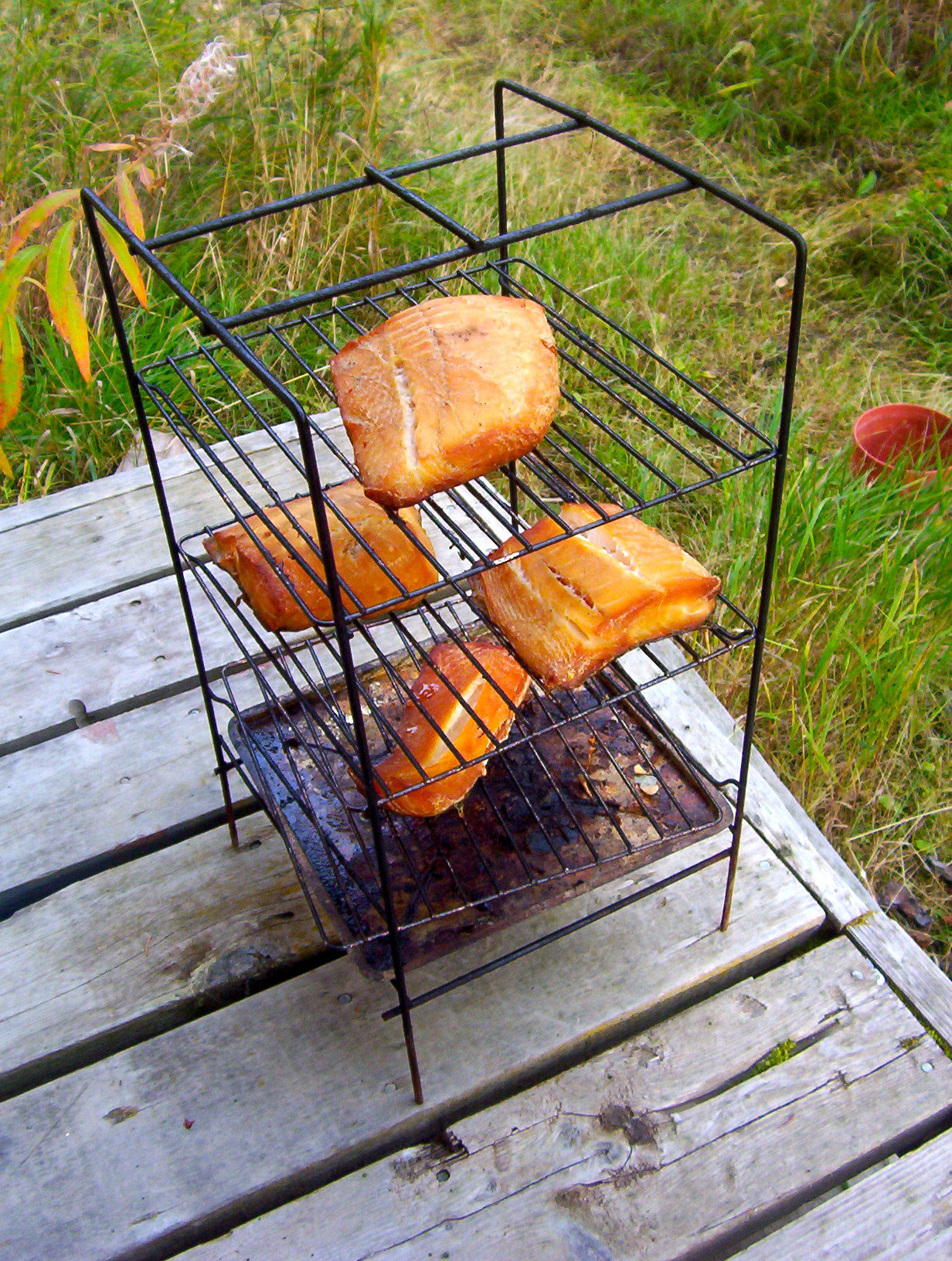
Pacific halibut filets hot-smoked with a blend of mesquite and alder woods

In Yorubaland, smoked fish are called Eja kika. Smoking preserves the fish and adds depth of flavor as well.

The most common types of smoked fish in the US are salmon, mackerel, whitefish and trout, although other smoked fish is also available regionally or from many ethnic stores. Salmon, mackerel and herring are universally available both hot-smoked and cold-smoked, while most other fish is traditionally preserved by only one of the smoking methods.

A commonly used name for cold-smoked salmon is lox, which is actually a different cured fish product of Jewish origin. The ingredients of true lox featuring just salt cured salmon belly. Cold smoked salmon has many different types available, usually identified by point of origin (e.g., from Scotland, Norway, Holland, the Pacific, and Nova Scotia, Canada—the latter usually identified as "Nova lox" or just "Nova"). Traditionally, "lox" designates brined rather than smoked salmon, "Gravad lax" or gravlax and traditional Jewish lox remain the only two types that are unmistakably not smoked fish. Most commercial labels still identify most smoked products as "smoked salmon" rather than "lox".

Most other smoked fish in the US is hot-smoked, although cold-smoked mackerel is always available in East-European delis, along with cold-smoked sturgeon, sea bass, halibut or turbot and many other varieties. Jewish delis often sell, in addition to lox, hot-smoked whitefish, mackerel, trout, and sablefish (also sometimes referred to as black cod in its fresh state). Along the Mississippi River, hot-smoked locally caught sturgeon is also available. Traditionally, in the US, cold-smoked fish, other than salmon, is considered "raw" and thus unsafe to consume without cooking. For this reason, in the US, cold-smoked fish is largely confined to specialty and ethnic shops.

In the Netherlands, commonly available varieties include both hot- and cold-smoked mackerel, herring and Baltic sprats. Hot-smoked eel is a specialty in the Northern provinces, but is a popular deli item throughout the country.

Smoked fish is a prominent item in Russian cuisine, Ashkenazi Jewish cuisine, and Scandinavian cuisine, as well as several Eastern and Central European cuisines and the Pacific Northwest cuisine.

In Israeli cuisine, smoked trout is traditionally eaten as part of meze, especially at breakfast. Sometimes rosemary leaves are added. Trout can be found in streams and rivers across the country as well as in the Sea of Galilee.

English, Scottish and Canadian cuisine incorporate a variety of strongly brined, smoked herring that used to be known as "red herring". With the increased use of the idiomatic expression "red herring", references to the smoked fish product in this manner declined. A more common current name for it is kippers, or kippered herring. Kippered herring traditionally undergoes further processing (soaking and cooking) before consumption. Arbroath Smokies (haddock) and Traditional Grimsby smoked fish (haddock and cod) have both received Protected Geographical Indication status from the European Commission, which restricts use of the name to fish that is processed using specific methods within a defined geographical area. Other smoked fish products from the UK include finnan haddie and bloaters.

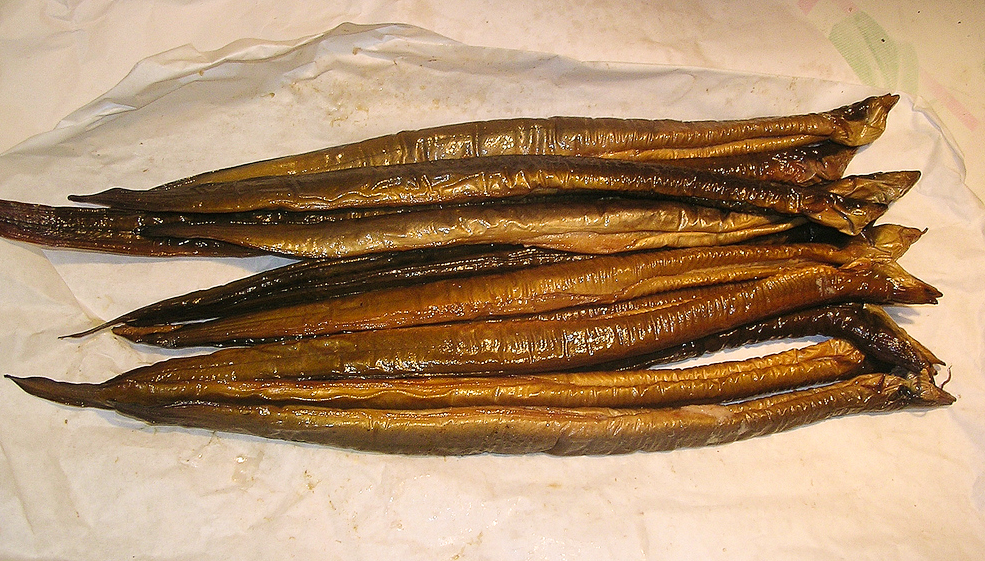
Smoked eels

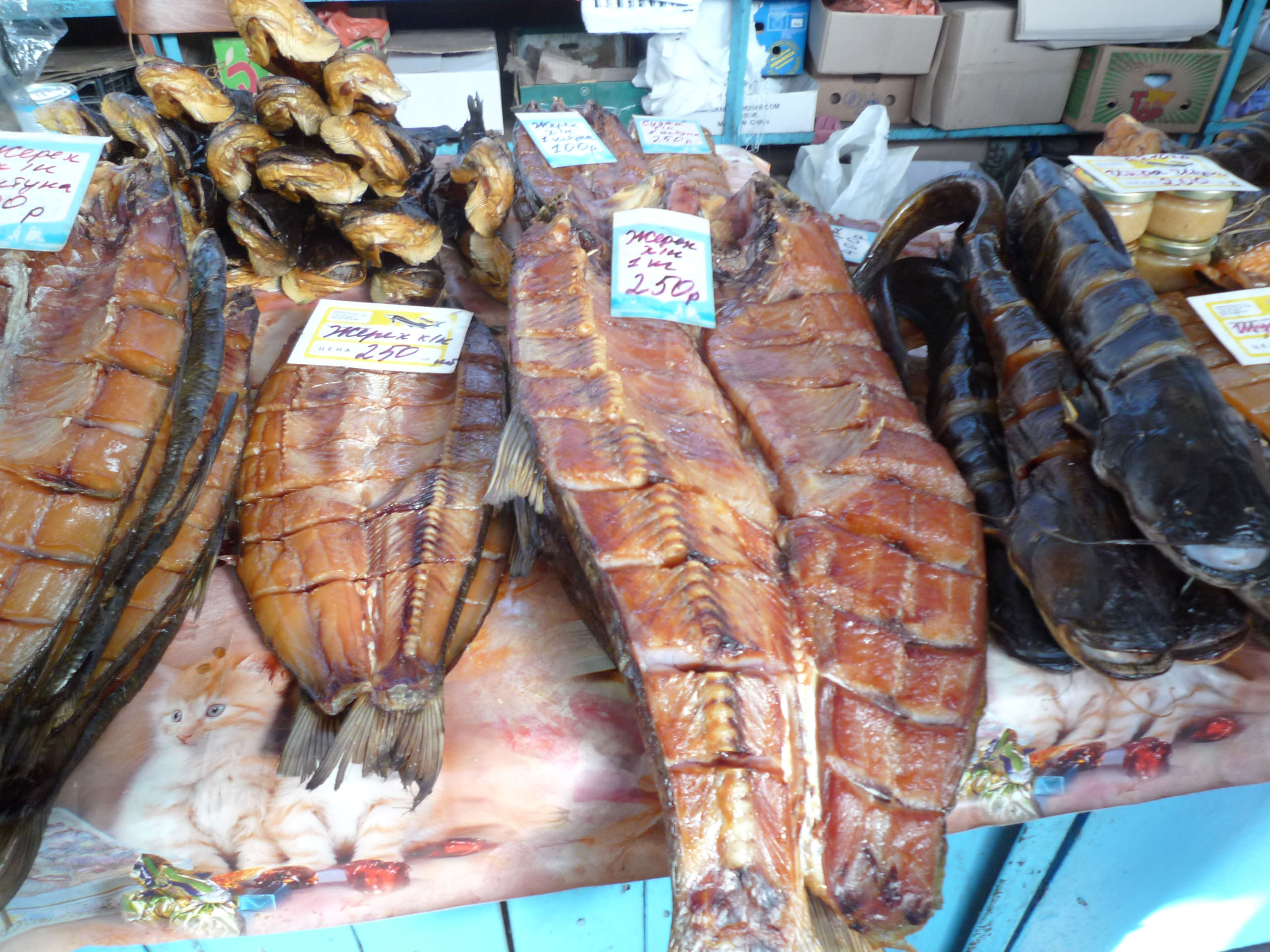
Smoked asp

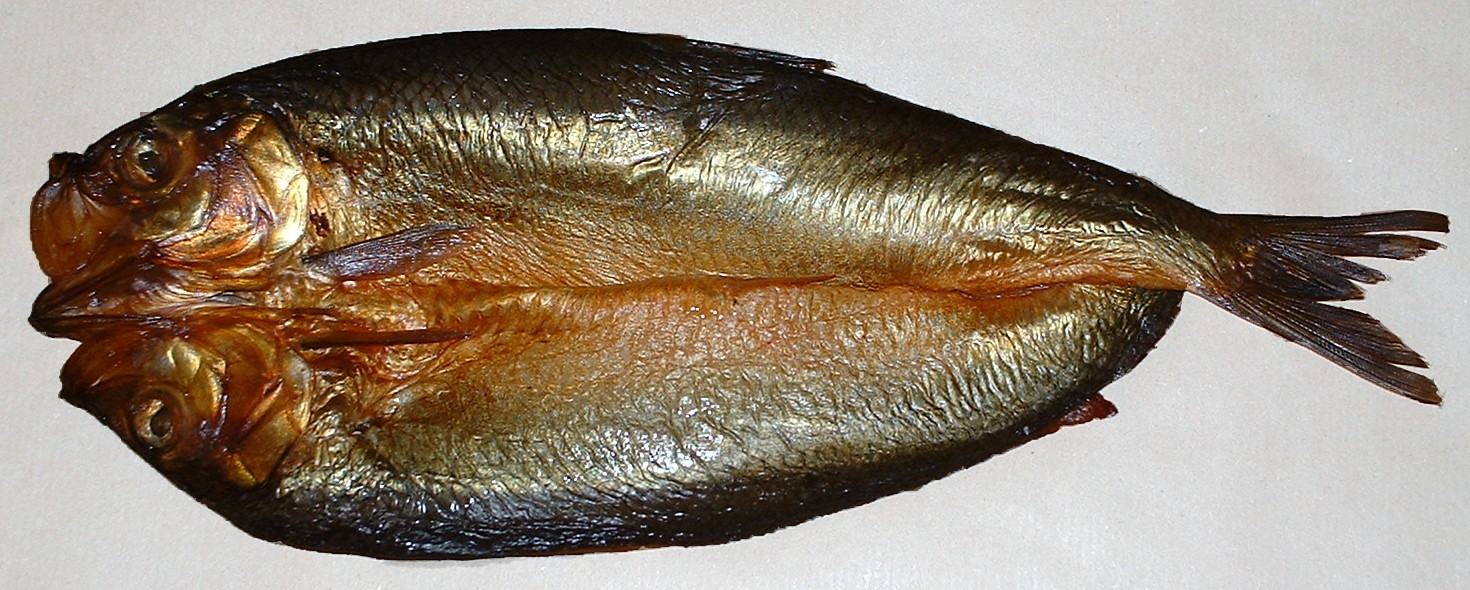
A kipper is a herring which has been split from tail to head, eviscerated, salted, and smoked.

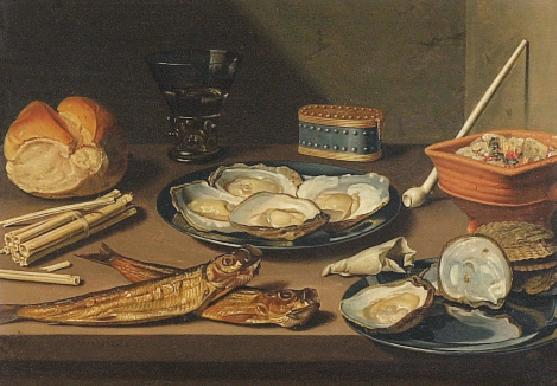
Still Life with Kippers, Oysters and Smoker's Accessories – Floris van Schooten, 1590–1655

== See also ==
- Arbroath smokie
- Cullen skink
- List of dried foods
- List of smoked foods
- Smoked meat
