= Smokies =

Smokies may refer to:

- Great Smoky Mountains, a major mountain range in the southern part of the Appalachian Mountains, eastern United States
- Great Smoky Mountains National Park, a national park that preserves the respective mountain range
- Tennessee Smokies, a minor-league baseball team in Knoxville, Tennessee, United States
- Arbroath smokie, smoked fish made in a fishing town in Scotland

== See also ==
- Smokie (disambiguation)
- Smoky (disambiguation), including uses of Smokey
