= Who Knew (disambiguation) =

"Who Knew" is a 2006 song by Pink.

Who Knew may also refer to:

- Who Knew?, a 2010 album by Keke Wyatt
- "Who Knew", a song by Eminem from The Marshall Mathers LP
- "Who Knew", a song by Lil Dicky from Professional Rapper
- "Who Knew", a song by Major Lazer
- "Who Knew", a song by Zach McPhee from Feels Country to Me, 2024
- "Who Knew?", a Season 11 episode of M*A*S*H
- Who Knew, a memoir by Barry Diller.
