= Old Smokey (disambiguation) =

Old Smokey is the nickname for the electric chair in New Jersey, Pennsylvania, and Tennessee.

Old Smoky or Old Smokey may also refer to:

- Live in Old Smokey, a 2006 CD by Linda Lewis
- Old Smokey, a location in Beaver Valley
- Old Smokey, a 1938 The Captain and the Kids cartoon
- "On Top of Old Smoky", a 1951 traditional American folk song
- On Top of Old Smoky (film), a 1953 film

== See also ==
- Smokie (disambiguation)
- Smoky (disambiguation), including uses of Smokey
