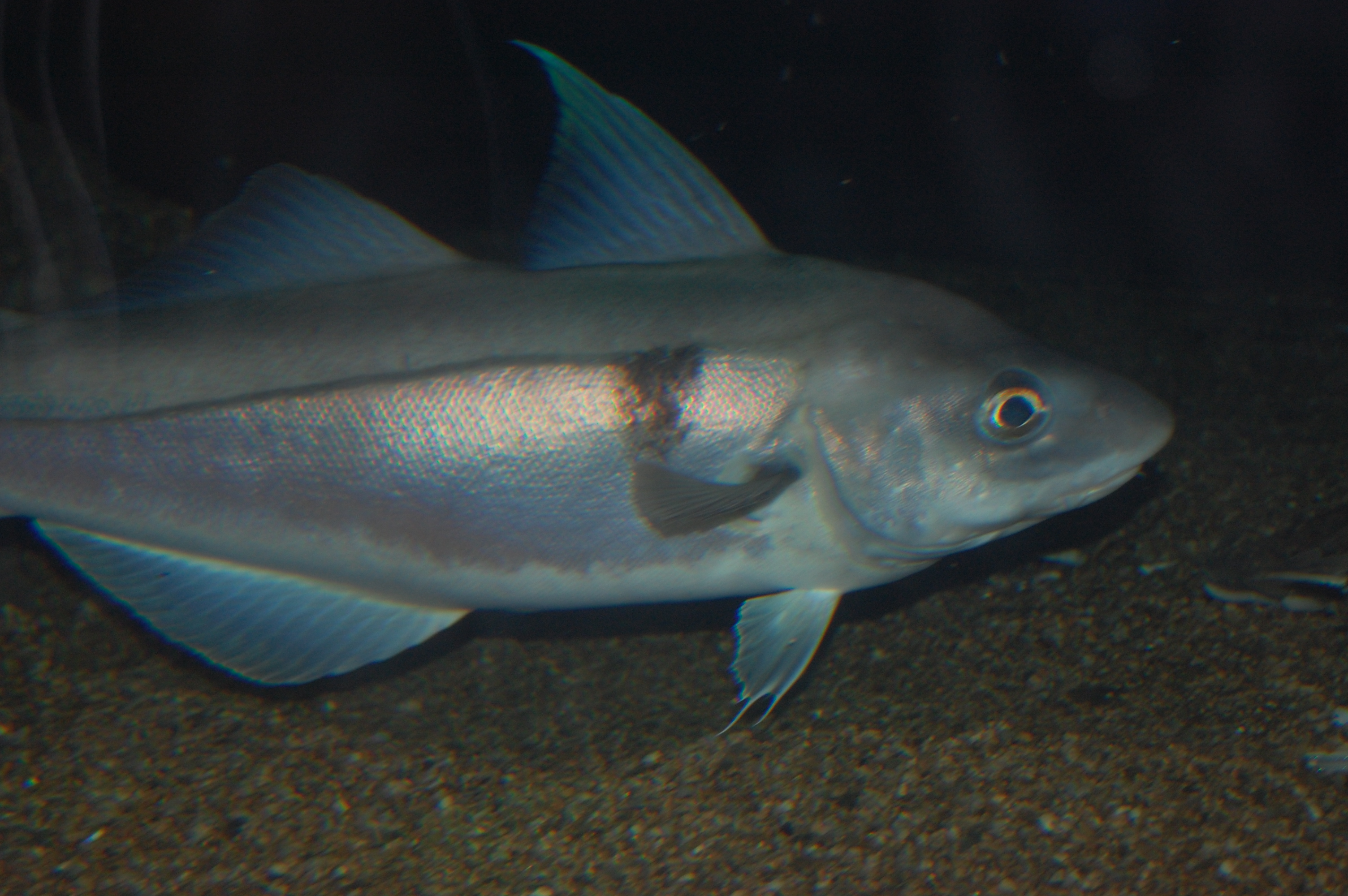
- Haddock at the New England Aquarium

Conservation status
- Vulnerable (IUCN 2.3)

Scientific classification
- Kingdom: Animalia
- Phylum: Chordata
- Class: Actinopterygii
- Division: Teleostei
- Order: Gadiformes
- Family: Gadidae
- Genus: Melanogrammus; T. N. Gill, 1862
- Species: M. aeglefinus

Binomial name
- Melanogrammus aeglefinus (Linnaeus, 1758)

Synonyms
- Gadus aeglefinus Linnaeus, 1758; Morhua aeglefinus (Linnaeus, 1758); Aeglefinus linnei Malm, 1877

= Haddock =

Species of fish

The haddock (Melanogrammus aeglefinus) is a saltwater ray-finned fish from the family Gadidae, the true cods. It is the only species in the monotypic genus Melanogrammus. It is found in the North Atlantic Ocean and associated seas, where it is an important species for fisheries, especially in northern Europe, where it is marketed fresh, frozen and smoked; smoked varieties include the Finnan haddie and the Arbroath smokie. Other smoked versions include long boneless, the filleted side of larger haddock smoked in oak chips with the skin left on the fillet.

== Description ==
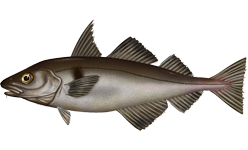

The haddock has the elongated, tapering body shape typical of members of the cod family. It has a relatively small mouth which does not extend to below the eye; with the lower profile of the face being straight and the upper profile slightly rounded, this gives its snout a characteristic wedge-shaped profile. The upper jaw projects beyond the lower more so than in the Atlantic cod. There is a rather small barbel on the chin. There are three dorsal fins, the first being triangular in shape and these dorsal fins have 14 to 17 fin rays in the first, 20 to 24 in the second, and 19 to 22 in the third. There are also two anal fins and in these there are 21 to 25 fin rays in the first and 20 to 24 fin rays in the second. The anal and dorsal fins are all separated from each other. The pelvic fins are small with an elongated first fin ray.

The upper side of the haddock's body varies in colour from dark grey brown to nearly black while the lower part of the body is dull silvery white. It has a distinctive black lateral line contrasting with the whitish background colour and which curves slightly over the pectoral fins. It also has a distinctive oval black blotch or 'thumbprint', sometimes called the "Devil's thumbprint", which sits between the lateral line and the pectoral fin, a feature which leads to the name of the genus Melanogrammus which derives from Greek "melanos" meaning "black" and "gramma" meaning letter or signal. The dorsal, pectoral, and caudal fins are dark grey in colour while the anal fins are pale matching the colour of the silvery sides, with black speckles at their bases. The pelvic fins are white with a variable amount of black spots. Occasionally there are differently coloured variants recorded which may be barred, golden on the back or lack the dark shoulder blotch.

The longest haddock recorded was 94 centimetres (37 inches) in length and weighed 11 kilograms (24 pounds). However, haddock are rarely over 80 cm (31 1/2 in) in length and the vast majority of haddocks caught in the United Kingdom measure between 30 and 70 cm (12 and 27 1/2 in). In eastern Canada waters, haddock range in size from 38 to 69 cm (15 to 27 in) in length and 0.9 to 1.8 kg (2 lb 0 oz to 3 lb 15 oz) in weight.

== Distribution ==
The haddock has populations on either side of the north Atlantic but it is more abundant in the eastern Atlantic than it is on the North American side. In the north-east Atlantic it occurs from the Bay of Biscay north to Spitzbergen; however, it is most abundant north of the English Channel. It also occurs around Novaya Zemlya and the Barents Sea in the Arctic. The largest stocks are in the North Sea, off the Faroe Islands, off Iceland and the coast of Norway but these are discrete populations with little interchange between them. Off North America, the haddock is found from western Greenland south to Cape Hatteras, but the main commercially fished stock occurs from Cape Cod and the Grand Banks of Newfoundland.

== Habitat and biology ==
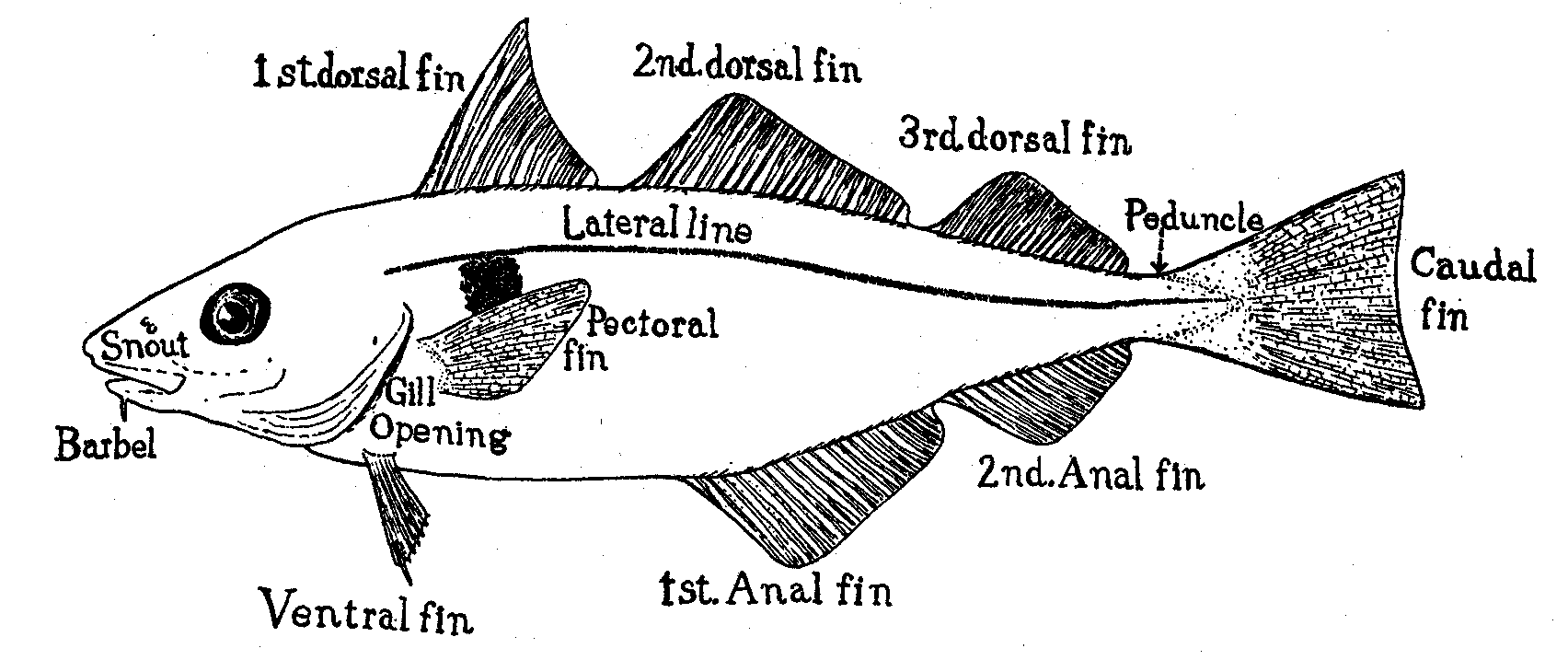
Fins, barbel and lateral line on a haddock. Haddock have three dorsal fins and two anal fins.

The haddock is a demersal species which occurs at depths from 10 to 450 m (33 to 1,500 ft; 5.5 to 250 fathoms), although it is most frequently recorded at 80 to 200 m (300 to 700 ft; 40 to 100 fathoms). It is found over substrates made up of rock, sand, gravel or shells and it prefers temperatures of between 4 and 10 °C (39 and 50 °F). Off Iceland and in the Barents Sea, haddock undergo extensive migrations, but in the north western Atlantic its movements are more restricted, consisting of movements to and from their spawning areas. They reach sexual maturity at 4 years old in males and 5 years old in females, except for the population in the North Sea which matures at ages of 2 years in males and 3 years in females. The overall sex ratio is roughly 1:1, but in shallower areas, females predominate, while the males show a preference for waters further offshore.

The fecundity of the females varies with size: a fish of 25 cm (10 in) length bears 55,000 eggs while a fish at 91 cm (36 in) has 1,841,000 eggs. Spawning takes place from depths of around 50 to 150 m (200 to 500 ft; 30 to 80 fathoms). In the northwestern Atlantic spawning lasts from January to July, although it does not occur simultaneously in all areas, and in the northeastern Atlantic the spawning season runs from February to June, peaking in March and April. The eggs are pelagic with a diameter of 1.2 to 1.7 millimetres (3/64 to 9/128 in), and they take one to three weeks to hatch. Following metamorphosis, the past larval fish remain pelagic until they attain a length of around 7 cm (3 in), when they settle to a demersal habit. Their growth rate shows considerable regional variation and fish at one year old can measure 17 to 19 cm (6 1/2 to 7 1/2 in), at 2 years old 25 to 36 cm (10 to 14 in), up to 75 to 82 cm (29 1/2 to 32 1/2 in) at 13 years old. Their lifespan is around 14 years. The most important spawning grounds are in the waters off the central coast of Norway, off the southwest of Iceland, and over the Georges Bank. The fish which spawn in inshore waters are normally smaller and younger fish than those which occur in offshore areas. The younger fish have a spawning season which is less than half of that of the larger and older stock offshore. Once hatched the larvae do not appear to travel far from their spawning grounds, however some larvae spawning off the west coast of Scotland are transported into the North Sea through the Fair Isle-Shetland Gap or to the northeast of Shetland.

In their larval stages, haddock mainly feed on the immature stages of copepods, ostracods and limacina with their diet changing as they grow, moving on to larger pelagic prey such as amphipods, euphausiids, eggs of invertebrates, zoea larvae of decapods and increasing numbers of copepods. Once they have reached the settled, demersal, post-larval stage, they gradually switch from pelagic to benthic prey. Adults primarily feed on benthic invertebrates such as sea urchins, brittlestars, bivalves and worms, however, they will feed opportunistically on smaller fish such as capelin, sandeels and Norway pout. Juvenile haddock are an important prey for larger demersal fish, including other gadoids, while seals prey on the larger fish.

The recorded growth rates of haddock underwent significant change over the 30 to 40 years up to 2011. Growth has been more rapid in recent years, with haddock attaining adult size much earlier than was noted 30–40 years ago. However, the degree to which these larger, younger fish contribute to reproductive success of the population is unknown. The growth rates of haddock, however, have slowed in recent years. There is some evidence which indicates that these slower growth rates may be the result of an exceptionally large year class in 2003. The haddock stock periodically has higher than normal productivity; for example in 1962 and 1967, and to a lesser extent, 1974 and 1999. These result in a more southerly distribution of the fish and have a strong effect on the biomass of the spawning stock, but because of high fishing mortality, these revivals do not have any lasting effect on the population. In general, there was above average recruitment from the 1960s up to the early 1980s, similar to recruitment for Atlantic cod and whiting, this has been called the gadoid outburst. There was strong recruitment in 1999 but since then, the recruitment rate has been very low.

== Parasites ==
Cod and related species are plagued by parasites, for example, the cod worm, Lernaeocera branchialis. The first host used by cod worm during their copepodid stage is a flatfish or lumpsucker, which they capture with grasping hooks at the front of their bodies. They penetrate the lumpsucker with a thin filament which they use to suck its blood. The nourished cod worms then mate on the lumpsucker.

The female worm, with her now fertilized eggs, then finds a cod, or a cod-like fish such as a haddock or whiting. There, the worm clings to the gills while it metamorphoses into a plump, sinusoidal, wormlike body, with a coiled mass of egg strings at the rear. The front part of the worm's body penetrates the body of the cod until it enters the rear bulb of the host's heart. There, firmly rooted in the cod's circulatory system, the front part of the parasite develops like the branches of a tree, reaching into the main artery. In this way, the worm extracts nutrients from the cod's blood, remaining safely tucked beneath the cod's gill cover until it releases a new generation of offspring into the water.

== Taxonomy and etymology ==
The haddock was first formally described as Gadus aeglefinus in 1758 by Carolus Linnaeus in the 10th edition of volume one of his Systema naturae with a type locality given as "European seas". In 1862 Theodore Nicholas Gill created the genus Melanogrammus with M. aeglefinus as its only species. The 5th edition of Fishes of the World classifies the haddock within the subfamily Gadinae, the typical cods, of the family Gadidae, which is within the superfamily Gadoidea of the order Gadiformes.

The generic name Melanogrammus means "black line", a reference to the black lateral line of this species. The specific name is a latinisation of the vernacular names egrefin and eglefin, used in France and England.

== Fisheries ==
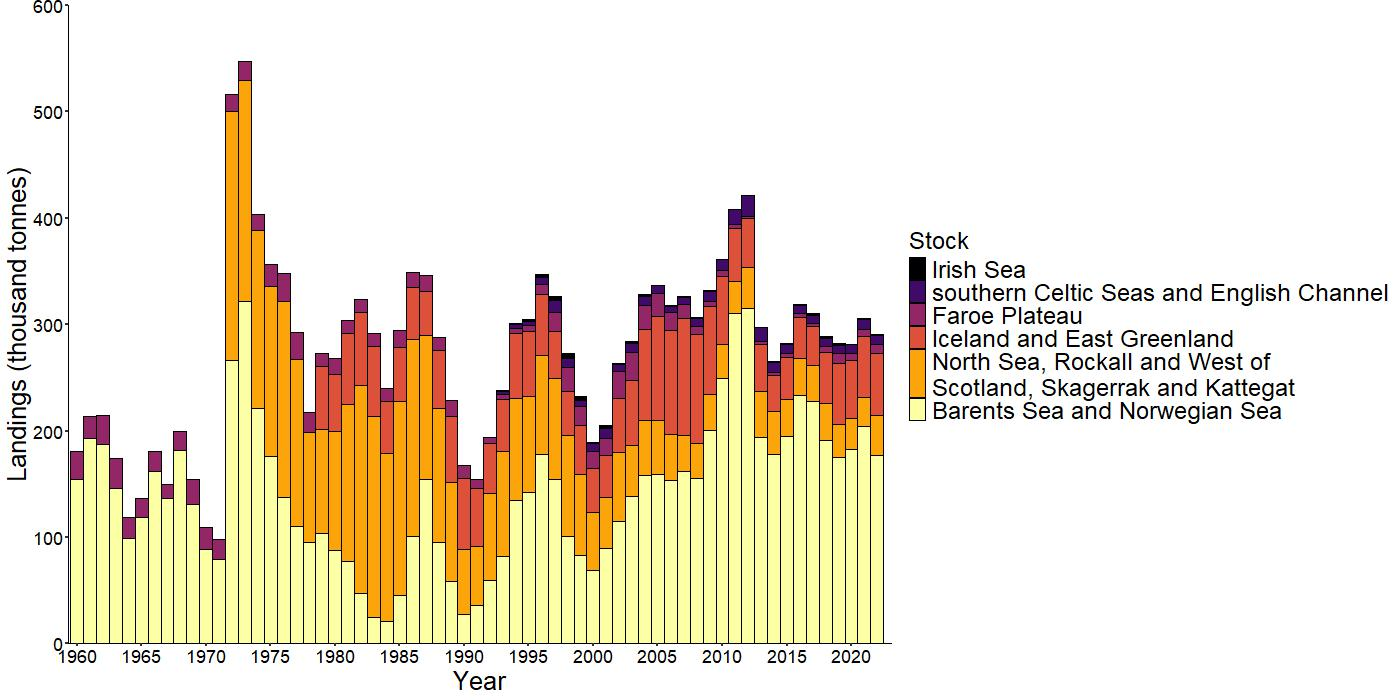
Landings of haddock in the eastern Atlantic in the period 1980–2022. Data from ICES.

Haddock is fished year-round using gear such as Danish seine nets, trawlers, long lines and gill nets and is often caught in mixed species fishery with other groundfish species such as cod and whiting. The main fishing grounds in the eastern Atlantic are in the Barents Sea, around Iceland, around the Faeroe Islands, in the North Sea, Celtic Sea, and in the English Channel. Landings in the eastern Atlantic have fluctuated around 200–350 thousand tonnes in the period 1980–2017. During the 1980s, the largest portion of the catch was taken at Rockall but from about 2000, the majority of the catch is caught in the Barents Sea. All the stocks in eastern Atlantic are assessed by ICES, which publish a recommendations on an annual basis for Total Allowable Catch.

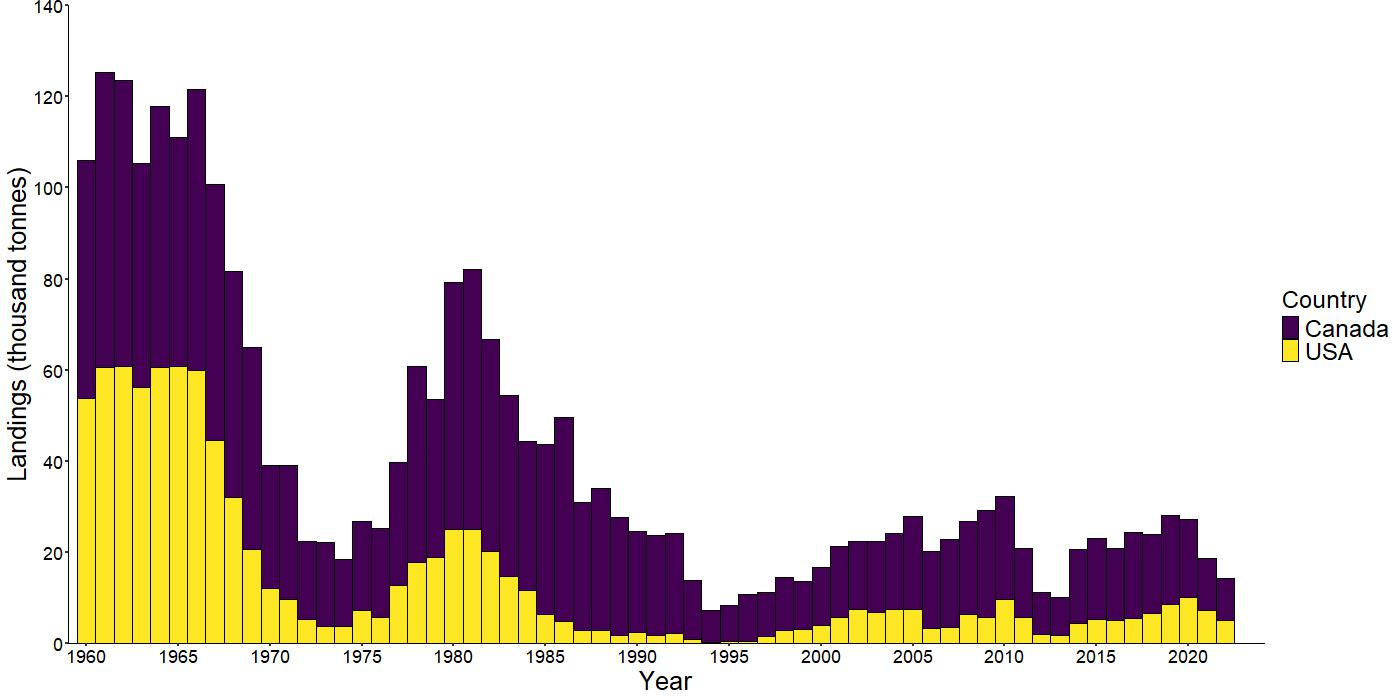
Landings of haddock in the western Atlantic in the period 1960–2022

In the western Atlantic the eastern Georges Bank haddock stock is jointly assessed on an annual basis by Canada and the United States and the stock is collaboratively managed through the Canada–United States Transboundary Management Guidance Committee, which was established in 2000. The commercial catch of haddock in North America was approximately 40–60 thousand tonnes per year between 1920 and 1960. This declined sharply in the late 1960s to between 5 and 30 thousand tonnes per year. Despite a few good years post-1970, landings have not returned to historical levels.

Haddock currently resides on the Greenpeace seafood red list due to concerns regarding the impact of bottom trawls on the marine environment. In contrast, Monterey Bay Aquarium considers haddock a "good alternative". Many haddock fisheries have been certified as sustainable by the Marine Stewardship Council. All seven stocks assessed in the eastern Atlantic are currently considered by ICES to be harvested sustainably. The haddock populations in the western Atlantic (offshore grounds of Georges Bank off New England and Nova Scotia) are also considered to be harvested sustainably.

== As food ==
Haddock, roast
Nutritional value per 100 g (3.5 oz)
- Energy: 469 kJ (112 kcal)
- Carbohydrates: 0.0 g
- Dietary fiber: 0.0 g
- Fat: 0.93 g
- Protein: 24.24 g
Vitamins and minerals
Vitamins	Quantity %DV^{†}
Thiamine (B1)	3% 0.040 mg
Riboflavin (B2)	3% 0.045 mg
Niacin (B3)	29% 4.632 mg
Pantothenic acid (B5)	3% 0.150 mg
Vitamin B6	20% 0.346 mg
Folate (B9)	3% 13 μg
Vitamin C	0% 0.00 mg
Minerals	Quantity %DV^{†}
Calcium	3% 42 mg
Iron	8% 1.35 mg
Magnesium	12% 50 mg
Phosphorus	19% 241 mg
Potassium	13% 399 mg
Zinc	4% 0.48 mg
- ^{†}Percentages estimated using US recommendations for adults, except for potassium, which is estimated based on expert recommendation from the National Academies.

Haddock is very popular as a food fish. It is sold fresh or preserved by smoking, freezing, drying, or to a small extent canning. Haddock, along with Atlantic cod and plaice, is one of the most popular fish used in British fish and chips.

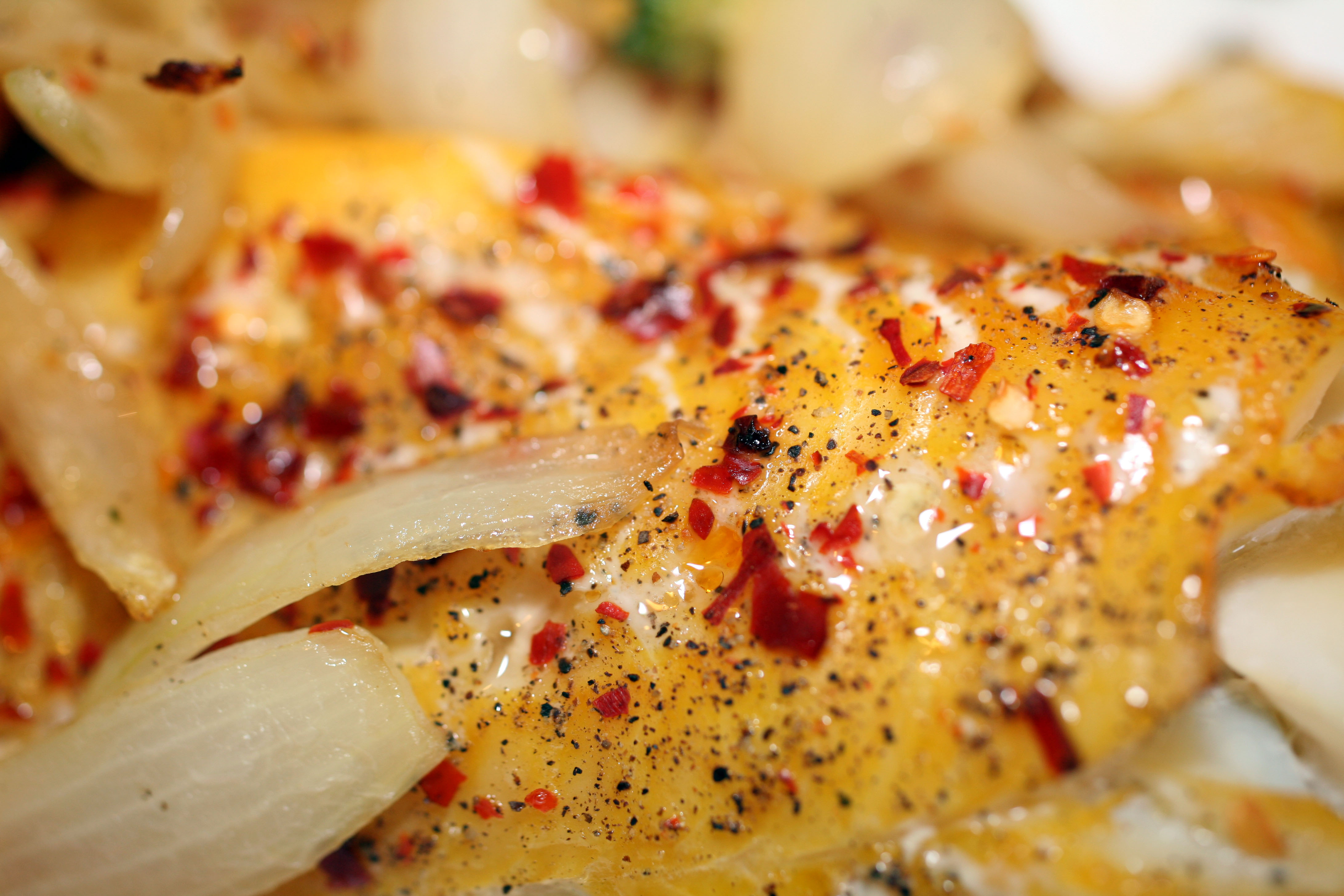
Smoked haddock served with onions and red peppers

When fresh, the flesh of haddock is clean and white and its cooking is often similar to that of cod. A fresh haddock fillet will be firm and translucent and hold together well but less fresh fillets will become nearly opaque. Young, fresh haddock and cod fillets are often sold as scrod in Boston, Massachusetts; this refers to the size of the fish which have a variety of sizes, i.e., scrod, markets, and cows. Haddock is the predominant fish of choice in Scotland in a fish supper. It is also the main ingredient of Norwegian fishballs (fiskeboller). Unlike cod, haddock is not an appropriate fish for salting and preservation is more commonly effected by drying and smoking.

The smoking of haddock was highly refined in Grimsby. Traditional Grimsby smoked fish (mainly haddock, but sometimes cod) is produced in the traditional smokehouses in Grimsby, which are mostly family-run businesses that have developed their skills over many generations. Grimsby fish market sources its haddock from the North East Atlantic, principally Iceland, Norway and the Faroe Islands. These fishing grounds are sustainably managed and have not seen the large scale depreciation in fish stocks seen in EU waters.

One popular form of haddock is Finnan haddie which is named after the fishing village of Finnan or Findon in Scotland, where the fish was originally cold-smoked over smouldering peat. Finnan haddie is often poached in milk and served for breakfast.

The town of Arbroath on the east coast of Scotland produces the Arbroath smokie. This is a hot-smoked haddock which requires no further cooking before eating.

Smoked haddock is naturally an off-white colour and it is frequently dyed yellow, as are other smoked fish. Smoked haddock is the essential ingredient in the Anglo-Indian dish kedgeree, and also in the Scottish dish Cullen skink, a chowder-like soup.
