= Nhoam svay =

Cambodian salad

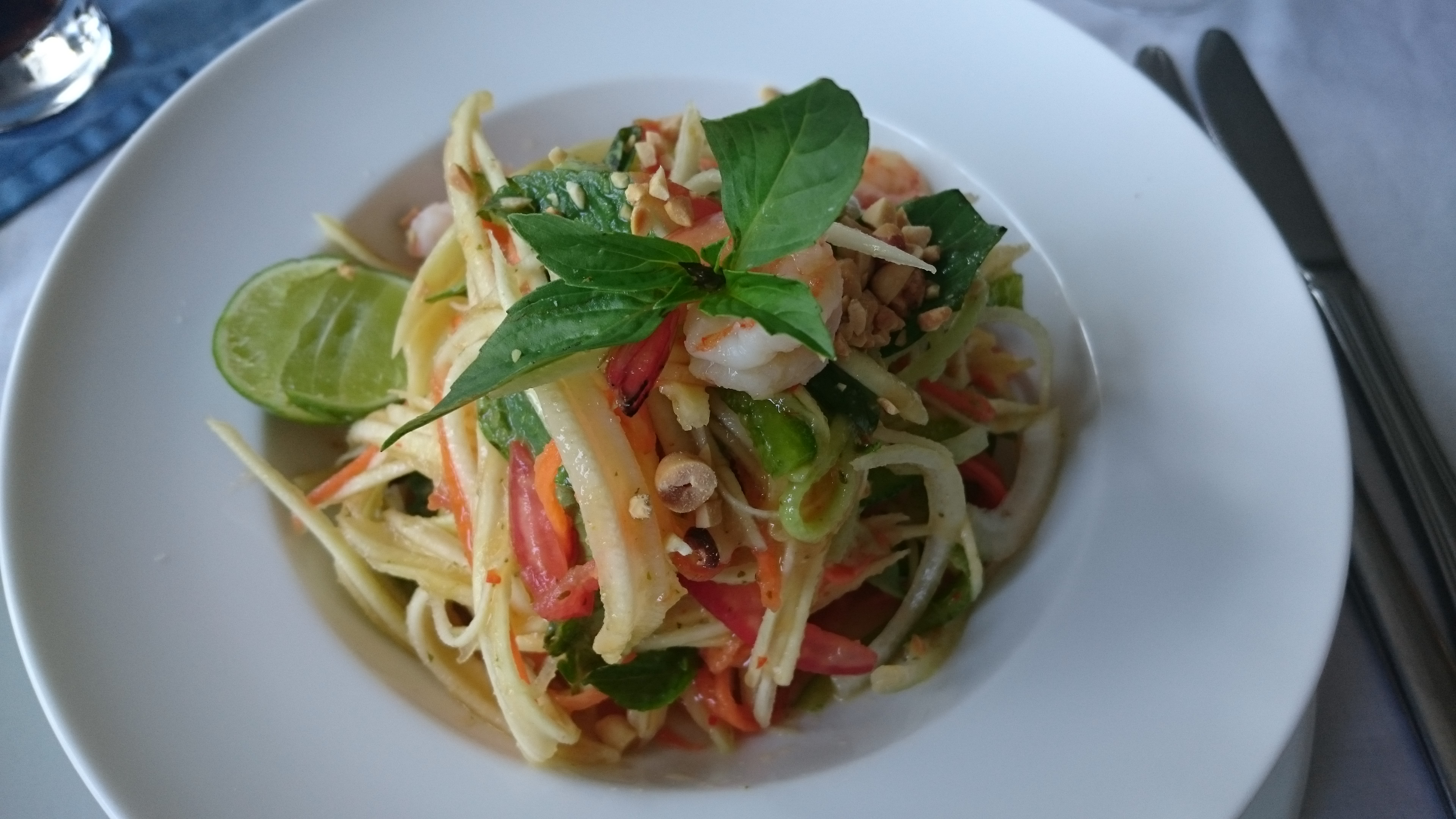
- Alternative names: neorm svay, noam swei, nhoam svay kchai
- Type: Salad
- Place of origin: Cambodia
- Associated cuisine: Cambodian cuisine
- Main ingredients: unripe mango, vegetables, dried smoked fish, dried shrimp, fresh herbs, fish sauce, lime juice, garlic, bird's eye chilies, palm sugar
- Food energy (per serving): 1,444 kcal (6,040 kJ)
Nutritional value
(per serving)
- Protein: 229g g
- Fat: 43g g
- Carbohydrate: 26g g
- Similar dishes: Yam mamuang, tam maak muang

Nhoam svay (Khmer: ញាំស្វាយ) is a Cambodian salad made from unripe mango, vegetables, dried smoked fish, dried shrimp, and fresh herbs, and a dressing made out of fish sauce, lime juice, finely chopped garlic and bird's eye chilies, and liquid palm sugar. The dish is commonly garnished with peanuts.

This dish is typically served in the countryside at weddings.

== Preparation ==
Shortly before serving, unripe mango that has been peeled and grated, julienned or shredded into 3 ounce threads and soaked into warm water is mixed in a bowl with various thinly sliced vegetables, such as tomatoes, onions, red bell peppers, shallots and garlic, pounded, skinned, deboned and flaked smoked fish or lightly fried fish or finely sliced boiled pork belly, dried shrimp that has been briefly soaked in warm water, various thinly sliced fresh herbs, such as Asian basil, mint, laksa leaves, and coriander, as well as a dressing made out of lime juice, fish sauce and palm sugar or brown sugar. It is garnished with chopped bird's eye chilies and chopped roasted peanuts.
