= Smokie =

Smokie may refer to:

- Smokie (band), an English rock band from Bradford, Yorkshire
- Smokie (food), sheep or goats prepared for food by blowtorching the fleece off the unskinned carcass
- Arbroath smokie, a type of smoked haddock fish
- "Smokie, Part 2", a 1959 instrumental by Bill Black's Combo

== See also ==
- Smokies (disambiguation)
- Smoky (disambiguation), including uses of Smokey
- Smoke (disambiguation)
