= Smoky Mountain =

Smoky Mountain is an adjective for things related to the Great Smoky Mountains (as in the Smoky Mountain National Park) and may refer to the following landforms:

- Smoky Mountain (California), a Guadalupe Mountains summit at 37.441064°N 120.032115°W
- Smoky Mountain (Idaho), a Cassia County, Idaho, summit at 42.059489°N 113.680172°W
- Smoky Mountain (Tennessee), a Cumberland Mountains summit of 3,217 ft (981 m)
- Smoky Mountain (Utah), a summit northwest of the Glen Canyon National Recreation Area at 42.059489°N 113.680172°W
- Smoky Mountains (Moon)

== See also ==
- Smokey Mountain, a former landfill in Manila
- Smokey Mountain (band)
