= Zach McPhee =

Canadian country music singer and songwriter

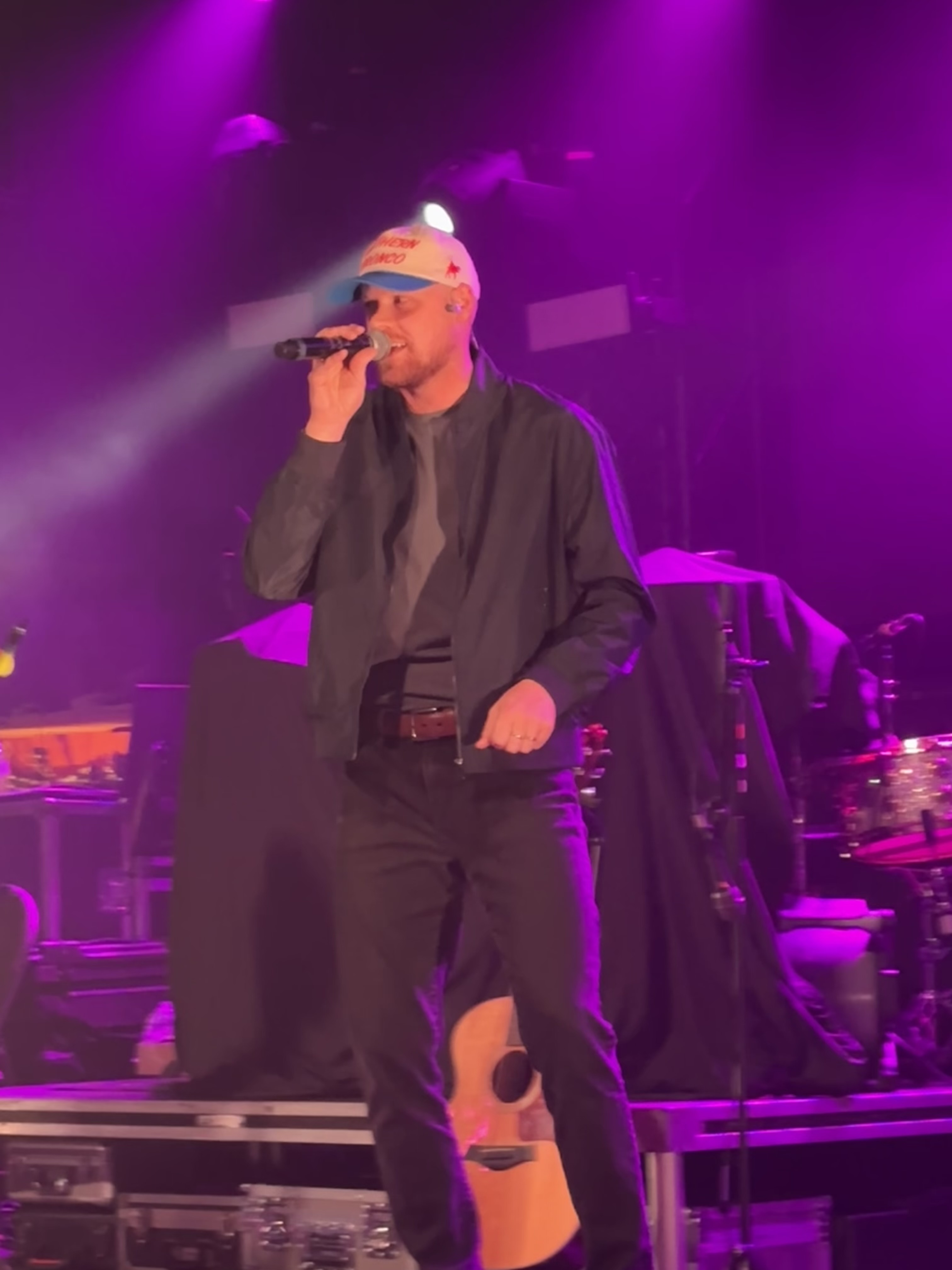
- McPhee performing at the Mod Club in Toronto, Ontario, in August 2025

Background information
- Born: March 5, 1993 (age 33); Vernon, British Columbia, Canada
- Genre: Country
- Occupations: Singer, songwriter
- Instruments: Guitar, vocals
- Years active: 2023-present
- Label: Independent
- Website: Official website

Zach McPhee is a Canadian country music singer-songwriter from Vernon, British Columbia. He has charted two singles, "Who Knew" and "Smoke", on the Billboard Canada Country chart.

== Early life and hockey career ==
McPhee was born and raised in Vernon, British Columbia in the Okanagan Valley. When he was a child, he suffered from a speech impediment and participated in speech therapy. During this process, McPhee learned to sing, which was a technique that was designed to aid his progress. He learned how to play the guitar at age 13.

McPhee excelled as a hockey player in his youth. At age 17, he played one season for the Junior A Vernon Vipers of the BCHL, before progressing to major junior, where he played parts of four seasons in the Western Hockey League with the Tri-City Americans, Everett Silvertips, and the Kootenay Ice. McPhee then played five seasons at the University of Regina, serving as an alternate captain for the final three seasons, while working on a degree in sociology. After university, he turned down a contract offer to play professional hockey in Sweden, electing to move closer to home to be near his family. McPhee moved to Kelowna, British Columbia, where he completed a degree in Clinical Counselling and Psychotherapy at the Kelowna College of Professional Counselling, and began work as a hockey coach and player development coordinator.

== Music career ==
While playing for the Kootenay Ice, McPhee was encouraged by his teammates to take music more seriously. He decided to create a YouTube account and post videos of him performing covers and original songs. Fellow BC native Aaron Pritchett reached out to McPhee in 2013 and invited him to do some initial recording. In 2019, he reached the top three of the "Denim on the Diamond" talent competition in Western Canada.

In January 2023, McPhee released his debut song "Bring On" to streaming platforms. On September 22, 2023, McPhee independently released his debut extended play Feels Country to Me. On August 16, 2024, he released a deluxe version of the EP, which included the singles "Who Knew" and "Smoke". In September 2024, McPhee signed a management deal with RLive. That same month, he won the 2024 SiriusXM Top of the Country contest. In 2025, McPhee won the Emerging Artist Award and Album of the Year at the BC Country Music Association Awards. "Smoke" became his first top ten hit at Canadian country radio, and his first single to be certified Gold in Canada. McPhee was nominated for Breakthrough Artist or Group of the Year at the 2025 Canadian Country Music Association Awards. He released the single "Feel Free" in September 2025.

== Personal life ==
McPhee and his wife Addie have a son, Mylo, who was born in 2024.

== Discography ==
=== Extended plays ===
Title	Details
Feels Country to Me	Release date: September 15, 2023; Label: Zach McPhee Music; Format: Digital download, streaming

=== Singles ===
Title	Year	Peak chart positions	Certifications	Album
Title	Year	CAN Country	Certifications	Album
"Who Knew"	2024	35		Feels Country to Me
"Smoke"	2025	7	MC: Gold	Feels Country to Me
"Feel Free"	2025	—		TBA
"The Way I Know You Now"	2026	31		TBA
