= Cullen skink =

Scottish smoked haddock soup

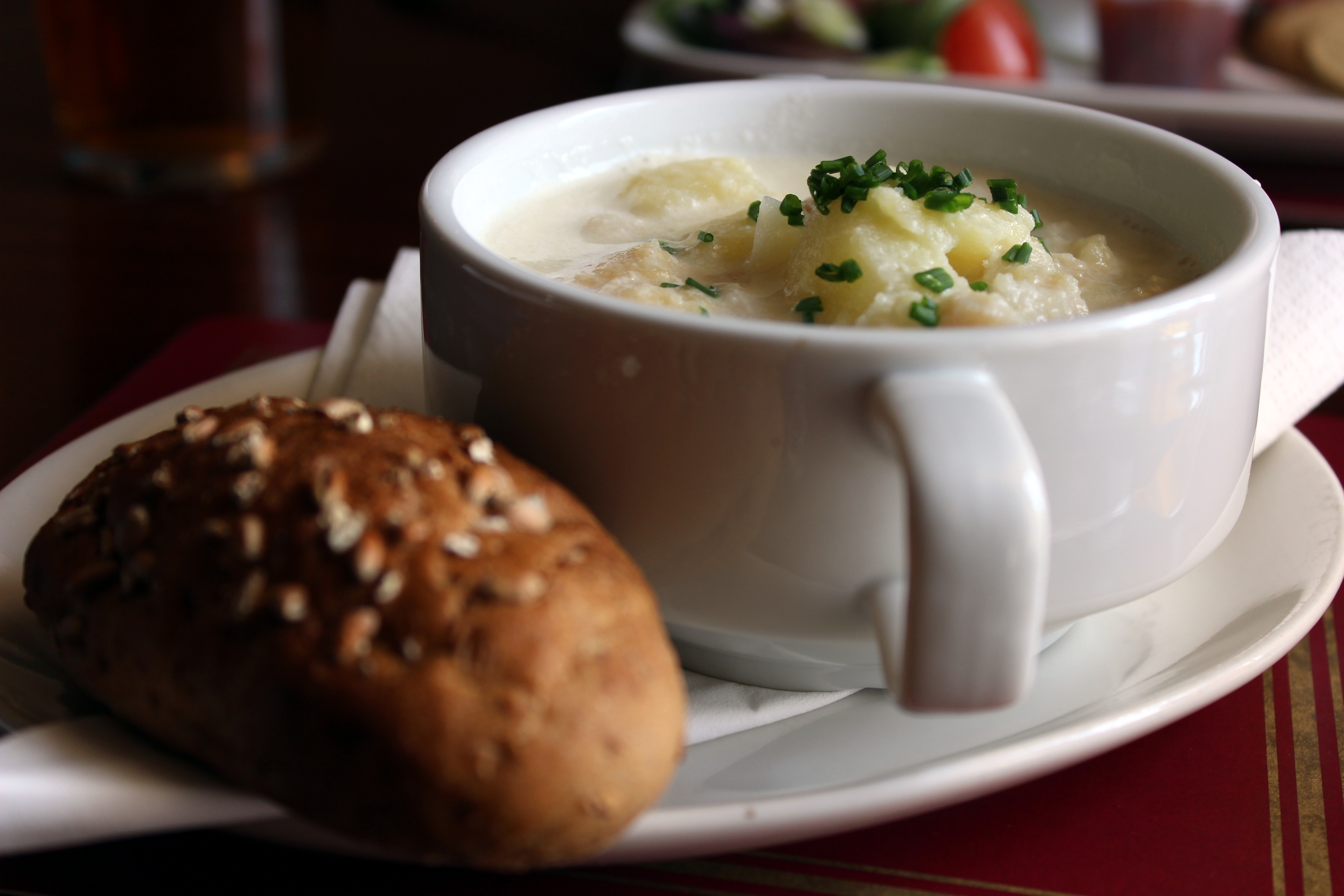
- Cullen skink, served with bread
- Type: Soup
- Course: Starter
- Place of origin: Scotland
- Region or state: Moray
- Serving temperature: Hot
- Main ingredients: Smoked haddock (finnan haddie), potatoes and onions

Cullen skink is a thick Scottish soup typically made of at least smoked haddock, potatoes, and onions. An authentic Cullen skink will use finnan haddie, but it may be prepared with any other undyed smoked haddock. Sometimes ocean perch or salmon are used in the soup. It is often served as a starter at formal Scottish dinners but is also widely served as a common dish across Scotland, especially in the northeast. Cullen skink appears in many traditional Scottish cookery books and restaurant and hotel menus throughout Scotland, the rest of the UK and abroad.

== Origins ==
This soup is a local speciality from the town of Cullen in Moray on the northeast coast of Scotland. It is believed that it was created by local fisherman as a way to use their plentiful catches of haddock.

=== Etymology ===
Skink is a Scots word for a shin, knuckle, or hough of beef, which has developed the secondary meaning of a soup, especially one made from these. The word skink is ultimately derived from the Middle Dutch schenke "shin, hough" (cognate with the English word shank and German Schenkel, 'thigh', and Schinken, 'ham').

== Recipes and description ==
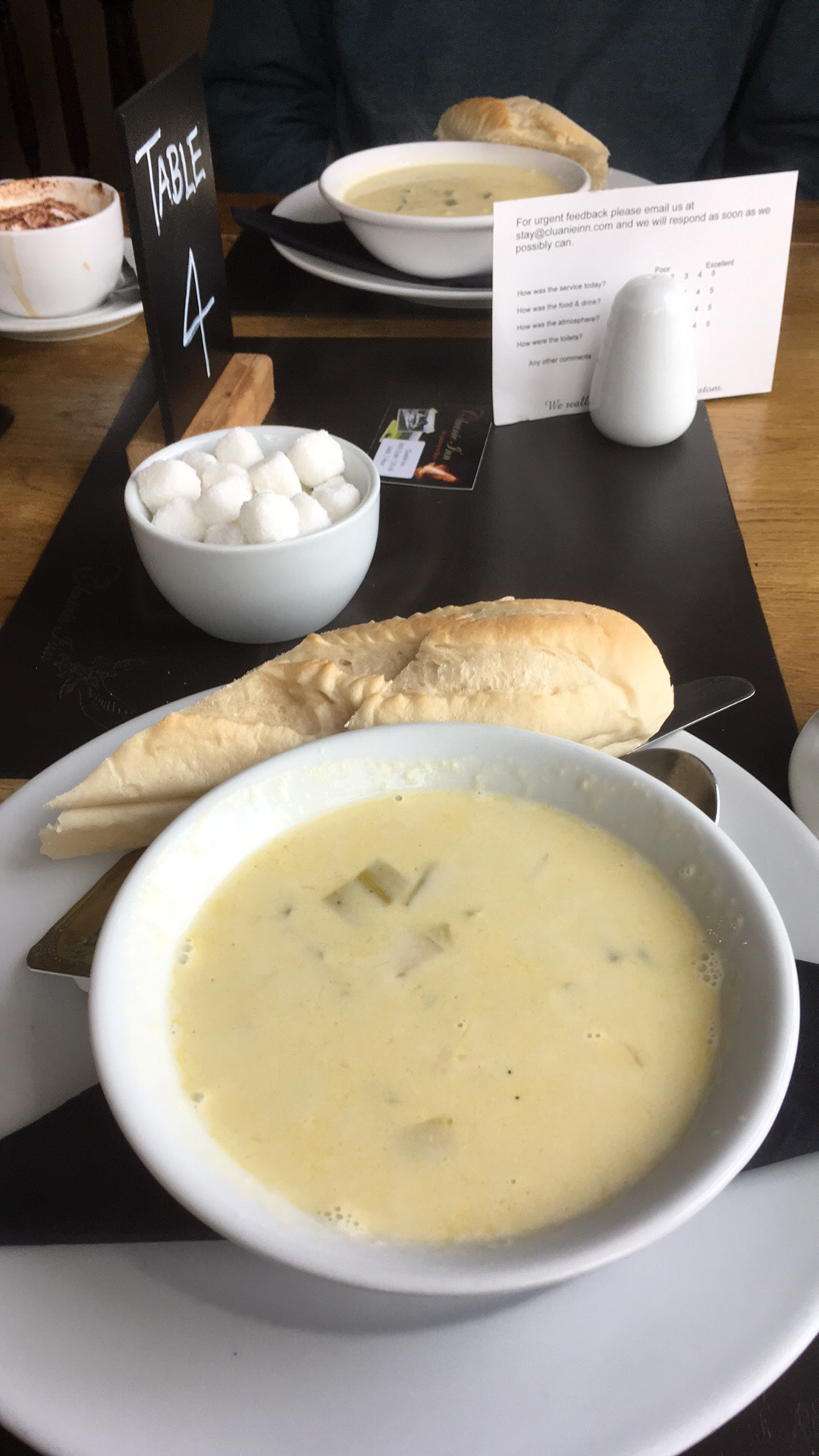
Cullen skink from Scotland

Local and other recipes for Cullen skink have several slight variations, such as the use of milk instead of water or the addition of single cream or butter or both. Other variations include mashing the potatoes to make the soup thicker. Cullen skink is traditionally served with bread or oatcakes crumbled through it for added texture.

It has been described as "smokier and more assertive than American chowder, heartier than classical French bisque".

In 2012 a Guardian columnist described the dish as "the milky fish soup which has surely replaced your haggises and porridges as Scotland's signature dish".

== World Championships ==
The Cullen Skink World Championships are an annual event involving cooking Cullen soup. It is held in Cullen with two events timed at 30 minutes. These are cooking traditional Cullen skink and cooking it with a variation.

== See also ==
- List of fish dishes
- List of soups
- Scottish cuisine
