= Smoke Lake =

Smoke Lake is the name of several bodies of water:

- Smoke Lake (Alberta), Canada
- Smoke Lake (Ontario), Algonquin Provincial Park, Canada
- Smoke Lake (Minnesota), Cook County, Minnesota, United States
- Smoke Lake (Wisconsin), Oconto County, Wisconsin, United States
