= Smoke (Zach McPhee song) =

2025 single by Zach McPhee

Single by Zach McPhee

from the album Feels Country to Me (Deluxe Edition)
- Released: January 27, 2025
- Genre: Country
- Length: 3:16
- Label: Independent
- Songwriter: Zach McPhee
- Producers: Dan Botch; Garrett Ward

Zach McPhee singles chronology
"Who Knew" (2024)	"Smoke" (2025)	"Feel Free" (2025)

"Smoke" is a song written and recorded by Canadian country music artist Zach McPhee. The song was produced by the production duo The Renaissance, composed of Garrett Ward and Dan Botch. It is the second single from the 2024 deluxe edition of McPhee's debut extended play, Feels Country to Me.

== Background ==
McPhee stated that he wrote "Smoke" in a few hours. He was inspired to write the song from a conversation he had with a family member about how smoke can "affect you" with its many different aspects, after he experienced several summers in the Okanagan Valley that saw plenty of wild fires. When writing the song, McPhee decided to "spin" the meaning, by comparing smoke to the many ways that a "certain somebody that you can't let go" carries on in your life. "Smoke" was the follow-up to McPhee's debut radio single "Who Knew".

== Charts ==
=== Weekly charts ===
Weekly chart performance for "Smoke"
Chart (2025)	Peak position
Canada Country (Billboard)	7

=== Year-end charts ===
Year-end chart performance for "Smoke"
Chart (2025)	Position
Canada Country (Billboard)	32

== Certifications ==
Certifications for "Smoke"
Region	Certification	Certified units/sales
Canada (Music Canada)	Gold	40,000^{‡}
^{‡} Sales+streaming figures based on certification alone.
