= Smoke (Miscione novel) =

Novel by Lisa Unger

- Author: Lisa Unger
- Language: English
- Genre: Crime fiction, Thriller
- Published: November 2005
- Publisher: Minotaur Books
- Publication place: United States

Smoke is a novel by bestselling author Lisa Unger writing as Lisa Miscione. It is the fourth and final book featuring Lydia Strong.

== Reception ==
Publishers Weekly wrote that the novel "offers appealing characters with rich inner lives as well as intelligent and credible dialogue." Jenny McLarin of the Booklist called it Miscione's "best to date" Hallie Ephron of The Boston Globe wrote that the novel has "much to recommend" and that it is "at times an engrossing read", the ending "doesn't quite deliver."
