= Finnan haddie =

Smoked haddock

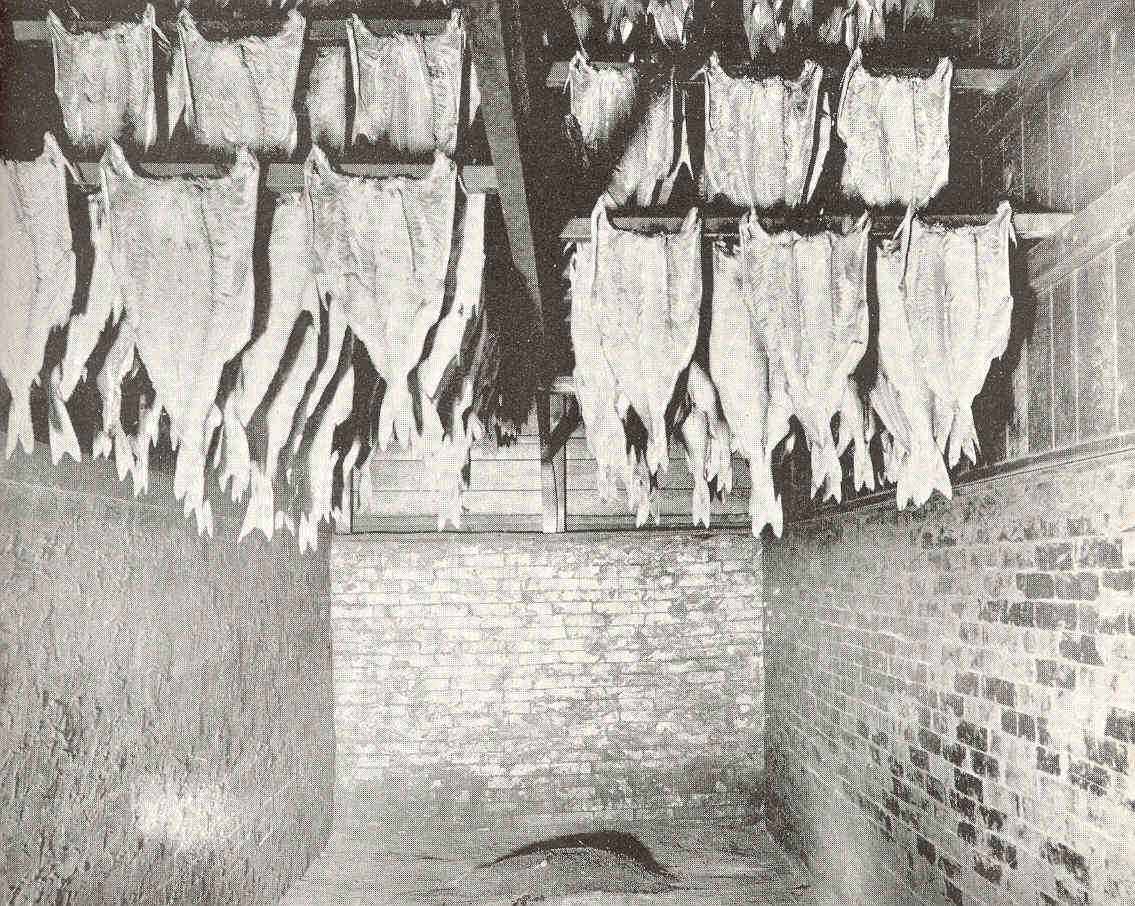
- Haddocks curing in a smokehouse
- Type: Fish
- Place of origin: Scotland
- Region or state: Aberdeenshire
- Associated cuisine: Scottish cuisine
- Main ingredients: Haddock, salt
- Similar dishes: Arbroath smokie

A Finnan haddie is a haddock that has been cured with the smoke of green wood or peat. They are usually said to have originated in Findon, a fishing village south of Aberdeen, though an alternative tradition traces them to Findhorn in Moray.

Although known and admired in Scotland for a long time, Finnan haddies became a popular food item in London only in the 1830s. In earlier times, because of the light smoking that the fish received, they did not have a long shelf life—three days at most, by most contemporaneous estimates (although some suggested no more than one day). Thus, although the fish was often available in Aberdeen within twelve hours of being caught, the distance to London was at that time insurmountable if spoilage was to be avoided. The fish started making its first appearances in London when shipped by established mail coach, but became widely available with the construction of the railway link connecting Aberdeen to London in the 1840s.

Finnan has a long association with the traditional Scottish fish soup Cullen skink, and most old Scottish recipe books cite Finnan haddie as the smoked haddock to be used for this dish.

The traditional preparation is to roast or grill the whole pieces of fish over high heat. Finnan haddie is also often served poached in milk for breakfast and is an important part of traditional kedgeree and the Arnold Bennett omelette.

== See also ==
- Arbroath smokie
- Cullen skink
- Kedgeree
- List of smoked foods
