= Smoky Mountains (Moon) =

Mountain range on the Moon

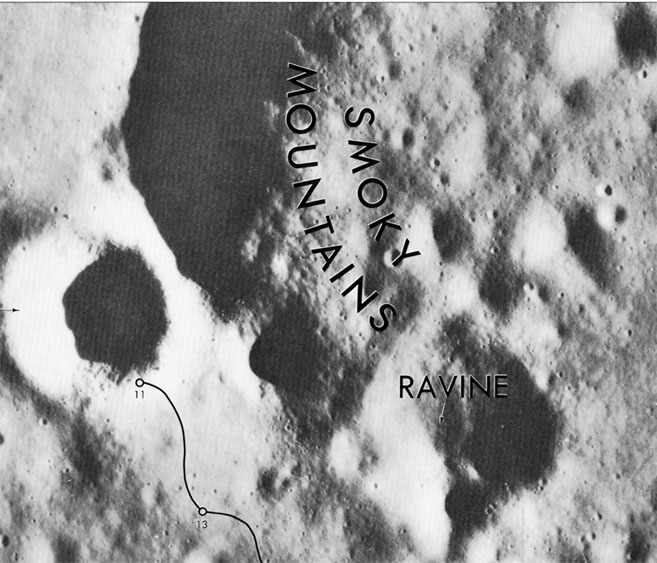
- cropped from Apollo 16 Site Traverses Chart. The mountain ridge continues to the north

Highest point
- Listing: Lunar mountains
- Coordinates: 8.8°S 15.6°E

Geography
- Location: the Moon

The Smoky Mountains are a small range of mountains on the Moon near the Apollo 16 landing site.
