= Smoky =

Smoky or Smokey may refer to:

== People ==
- Smoky Babe (1927–1975), American acoustic blues guitarist and singer born Robert Brown
- Smoky Burgess (1927–1991), American Major League Baseball catcher
- Smoky Dawson (1913–2008), Australian country music performer born Herbert Brown
- Henry Harris (ice hockey) (1905-1975), Canadian hockey player
- Smoky Owens (1912-1942), American baseball pitcher in the Negro leagues
- Smokey Robinson (born 1940), American R&B singer and songwriter
- Smokey Rogers, American Western swing musician Eugene Rogers (1917–1993)
- Ernest Smith (1914–2005), Canadian recipient of the Victoria Cross
- Smoky Joe Wood (1889–1985), American Major League Baseball pitcher
- Smokey Yunick (1923–2001), NASCAR designer
- Lois Smoky Kaulaity (1907–1981), Kiowa painter

== Places ==
- Smoky Cape, Australia
- Smoky Dome, a mountain in Idaho
- Smoky Group, a Canadian geologic formation
- Smoky Hills, central United States
- Smoky Lake (Blaine County, Idaho)
- Smoky Mountain (disambiguation)
- Smoky Point, Alaska
- Smoky Range, a small mountain range in Montana
- Smoky River, Alberta, Canada
- Smoky Township, Sherman County, Kansas

== Arts and entertainment ==
- Smoky, the title character of Smoky the Cowhorse, a Newbery Medal-winning novel by Will James, and its adaptations:
  - Smoky (1933 film), starring Victor Jory
  - Smoky (1946 film), starring Fred MacMurray
  - Smoky (1966 film), starring Fess Parker
- Smokey (album), by Smokey Robinson
- Sheriff Buford T. Justice / "Smokey Bear", the title character of the film Smokey and the Bandit (1977), and its sequels:
  - Smokey and the Bandit II (1980)
  - Smokey and the Bandit Part 3 (1983)
- Smokey, a character from the film Friday (1995)
- Smokey, a character from the film The Big Lebowski (1998)
- Smokie (band), an English band formerly known as Smokey

== Animals ==
- Smokey Bear, mascot of the United States Forest Service
- Smoky (war dog), a dog in World War II
- Smoky (Olympic mascot), a dog mascot at the 1932 Summer Olympics
- Smokey (mascot), a dog mascot of the University of Tennessee

== See also ==
- Great Smoky Mountains, on the Tennessee–North Carolina border
- Little Smoky River, Alberta, Canada
- Little Smoky Valley, Nevada
- Old Smokey (disambiguation)
- Smokey Joe (disambiguation)
- Smokie (disambiguation)
