= Traditional Grimsby smoked fish =

British regionally processed fish food product

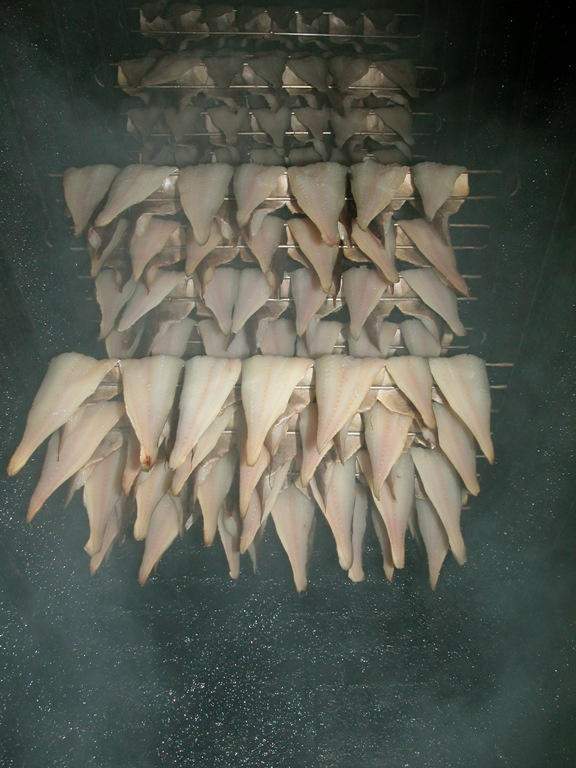
Traditional Grimsby smoked haddock

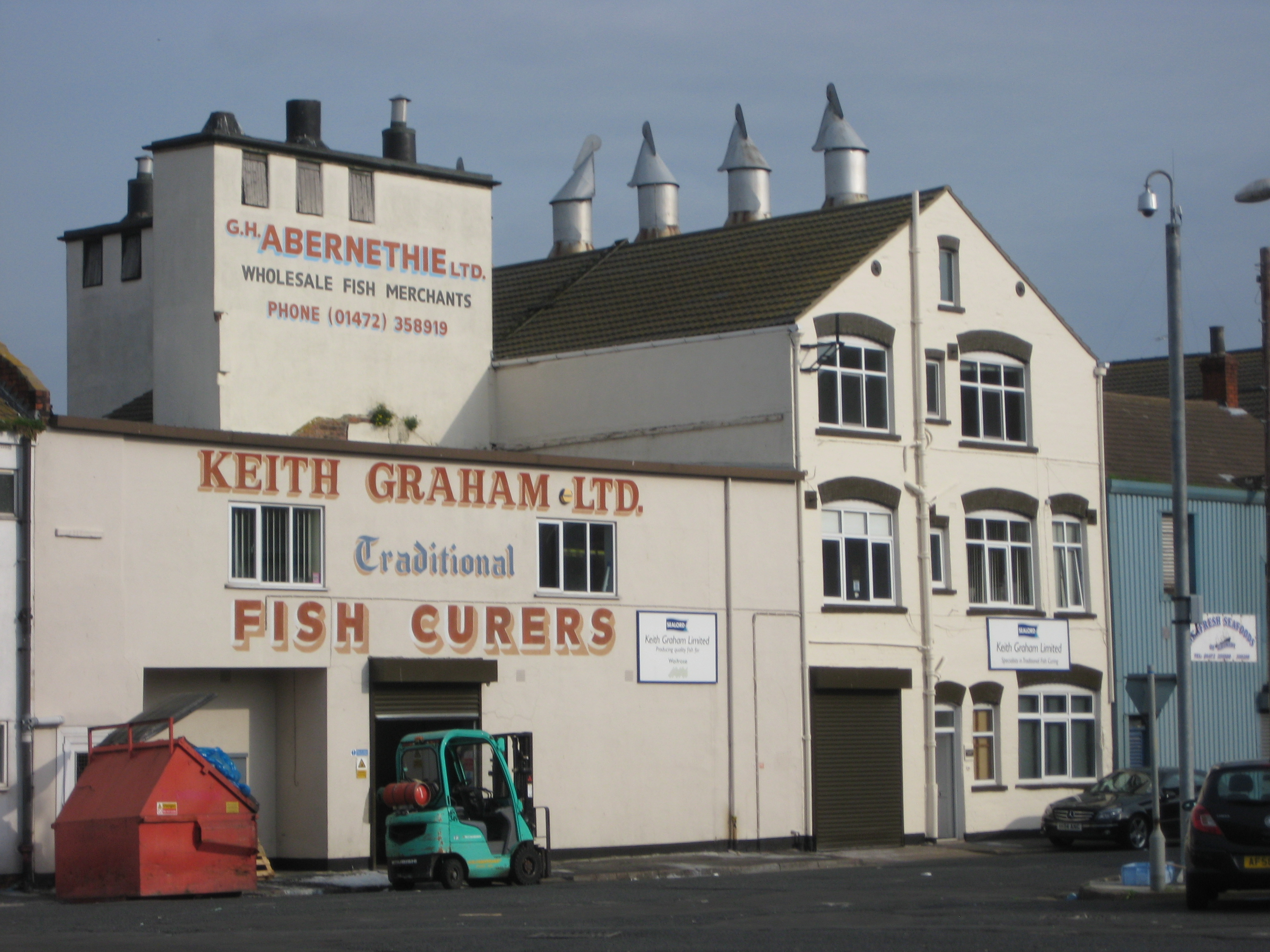
Keith Graham Fish Curers, Suppliers of "Traditional Grimsby Smoked Fish"

Traditional Grimsby smoked fish are regionally processed fish food products from the British fishing town of Grimsby, England. Grimsby has long been associated with the sea fishing industry, which once gave the town much of its wealth. At its peak in the 1950s, it was the largest and busiest fishing port in the world.

The UK's Department for Environment, Food and Rural Affairs (DEFRA), defines Traditional Grimsby smoked fish "as fillets of cod and haddock, weighing between 200 and 700 grams [7 and 25 oz], which have been cold smoked in accordance with the traditional method and within a defined geographical area around Grimsby. After processing the fish fillets vary from cream to beige in colour, with a characteristic combination of dry textured, slightly salty, and smokey flavour dependent on the type of wood used in the smoking process. Variations in wood quality, smoke time and temperature control the end flavour. The smoking process is controlled by experienced cold smokers trained in the traditional Grimsby method. In 2009, Traditional Grimsby smoked fish was awarded Protected Geographical Indication (PGI) status by the European Commission.

== History ==
Foods have been smoked or cured throughout history as a means of preserving. People in many cultures and societies around the world have relied on the smoke-curing of fish and meat products as a method of long-term storage.

In modern times, with the advent of more efficient methods of preserving and storing food, such as chilling and freezing, some foods are still smoked for the distinctive taste and flavour.

Until the 1940s, all smoked fish was referred to as "cured" and was produced using the traditional method of hanging the fish in chimneys above slowly smouldering wood shavings. With the invention of motorised mechanical kilns, traditional smokers began referring to their product as "smoked" to emphasise that their process was entirely dependent on the smoke produced from the natural smouldering wood. By contrast, mechanical kilns developed various methods using automatic smoke generators. The most common method of mechanical smoking involves the use of smoke condensates, smoke distilled and transported to the factory in liquid or solid form before the industrial transposition of the condensate back into a gaseous substance.

Nevertheless, mechanical kiln curers also began using the term "smoked" for their process. Subsequently, the original process is now known as "traditional smoked" to allow people to continue to understand there is a difference between the production methods.

Many developments in smoked fish took place in Grimsby in the UK. Prior to World War II, Grimsby had developed to become one of the largest fishing ports in Europe. As a result, Grimsby became a focus for developments in traditional smoked fish and later mechanical kiln smoked fish. The traditional smokehouses which have survived in England are mainly found in Grimsby.

Despite its success, the Cod Wars in the 1970s spelt the end of Grimsby's height as a fishing port. As Iceland and Norway created protected zones around their national waters. A condition of the UK joining the EEC (predecessor of the EU) was that British waters would become Community waters and the total catch was divided between other nations by the use of quotas. These quotas for North Sea fish stocks led to a decline in numbers of fish landed from boats based at the port. Many Grimsby fishermen were unable to continue to fish economically. This inevitably had a negative impact on fish processing there. Many traditional smokehouses went out of business. By the 1980s, the smoked fish industry in the port had diminished significantly.

During the 1980s, the trade with Iceland and Norway was re-established, but with the fish now coming to the port via container. This allowed the fish processing industry to survive in Grimsby and saved the traditional smokehouses.

== Production ==
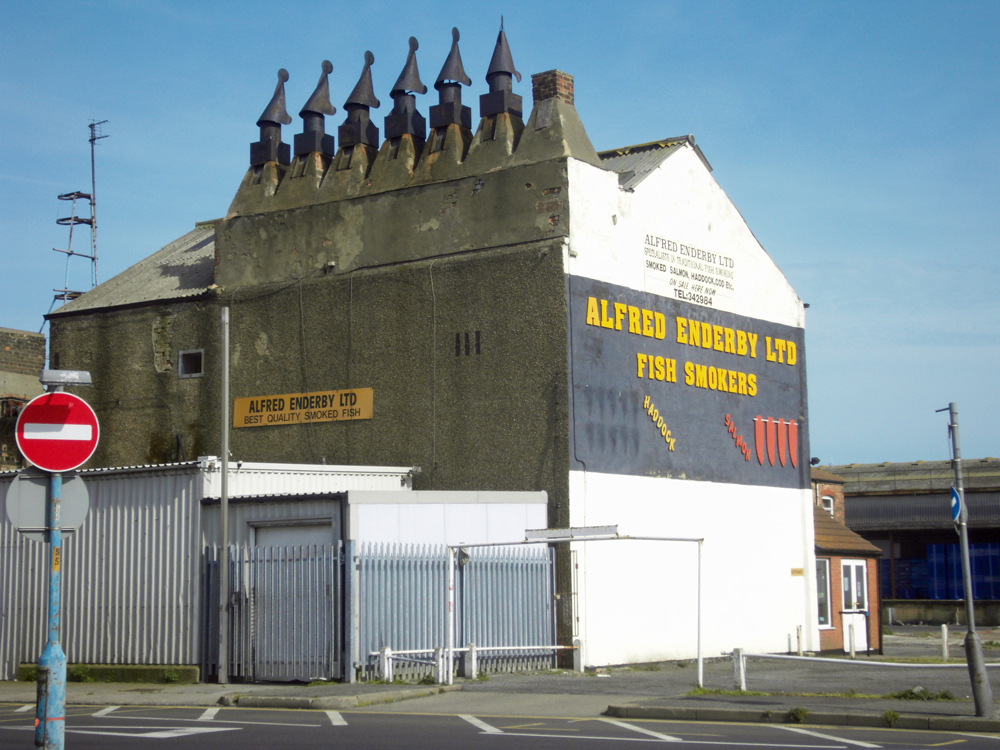
Alfred Enderby Grimsby smokehouse

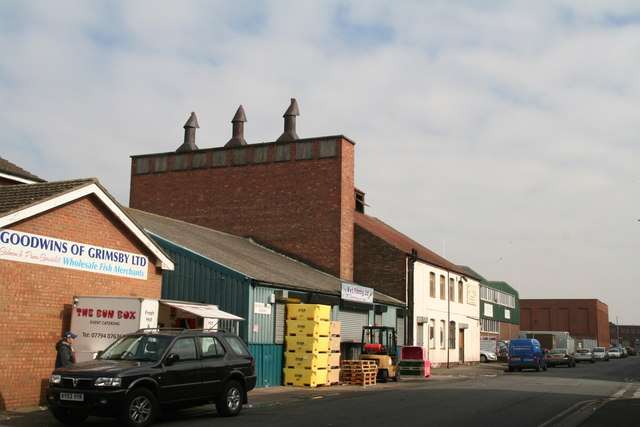
Grade II listed Russell fish smoke house, Grimsby

Grimsby benefits from cool, dry winds from the North Sea and Humber estuary, which aid the process of cold smoking fish overnight by keeping the mean summer maximum temperatures below 20 °C (68 °F), which is significantly cooler than inland.

The characteristics of traditional Grimsby smoked fish are linked to the geographical area on the basis of tradition, reputation, the smoking process and the skills of those involved in the process, skills which have been passed down from generation to generation.

Traditional smoking is a specialist process. The quality standards laid down by the EU Protected Geographical Indication mean producers of traditional Grimsby smoked fish must adhere to strict controls and measures to ensure the authenticity of their process. Mechanical smoking has a quantitative approach. Mechanical smokers smoke both hot and cold fish, meat, cheese and even garlic. With fish as just a small component in their repertoire, they are less likely to buy their fish direct, which means they will not have seen it and it will probably be older coming from further down the supply chain. Using older fish negates any advantage gained from a quicker mechanised smoking time.

Being based in Grimsby is of significant advantage to smokers. Grimsby fish market has one of the highest throughputs of haddock and cod in the world. This means smokers can buy fresh fish from Iceland, Norway and Faroe every morning.

According to the criteria established by the Grimsby Traditional Fish Smokers Group, the production of traditional Grimsby smoked fish is outlined as follows:

Fresh whole fish are usually sourced from Iceland, Faroe and Norway but can be sourced from other areas. Skilled filleters fillet the whole fish by hand. The filleted fish are then immersed in brine, for 10 to 15 minutes and then drained on metal rod racks known as speats at the end of the working day. The fish on the speats are put into the smokehouse chimneys at heights that suit the cold smoking process.

The base of the smokehouse is laid with a covering of sawdust where 'fire' is introduced to start the sawdust smoldering. The rate at which the fish is smoked is dependent on the size of the fish, but also to a great degree by the ambient temperature and humidity. This means that in summer the sawdust needs the oxygen removed and only a small amount of 'fire' is needed to start the sawdust smoldering. In winter the sawdust needs less or no oxygen removed and more 'fire' is needed to start the sawdust smoldering. The fillets are left overnight for a minimum of 8 hours. Regular monitoring of the smoking process by skilled smokers is carried out to ensure the fish is smoked evenly, moving and removing fish when necessary. There is no heat involved, this is because the fish would start to cook during the smoking process and would start to flake and fall from the speats.

The fish are then removed from the smokehouses and allowed to cool. Once cooled, they are packed into interleaved shallow purpose built cartons or in individual vacuum packs for transportation to a range of outlets both within the UK and abroad.

== Public awareness and marketing ==
In 1998, celebrity chef Rick Stein visited the Grimsby fish docks and observed the traditional fish smoking process, saying of the experience that he was "amazed at the skill involved in traditional fish smoking. It is worlds apart from computer controlled kiln drying. If it were in France it would have an Appellation Controlee."

While supermarkets tend to express greater interest in the quantity of fish mechanical kiln smokers can produce, traditional smoked fish has become a high-end market product increasingly popular amongst top restaurants.

== Use of the name ==
In October 2009, Traditional Grimsby Smoked Fish was awarded the EU's Protected Geographical Indication (PGI) status by the European Commission. This status was supported by Jim Fitzpatrick, the then Minister of State at Defra. This followed a ten-year campaign by the Grimsby Traditional Fish Smokers Group to promote a greater understanding of the traditional skills and geographical qualities that create the food. This means only fish processed in Grimsby using the traditional smoked method can use the name. Producers, who are members of the Grimsby Traditional Fish Smokers Group, must be regularly audited by the Trading Standards department of North East Lincolnshire Council to make sure their practices comply with specific criteria that define the traditional smoking process. Approved producers may use the PGI logo on the fish they sell.

== See also ==
- List of smoked foods
