= Arbroath smokie =

Type of smoked haddock

Arbroath smokies
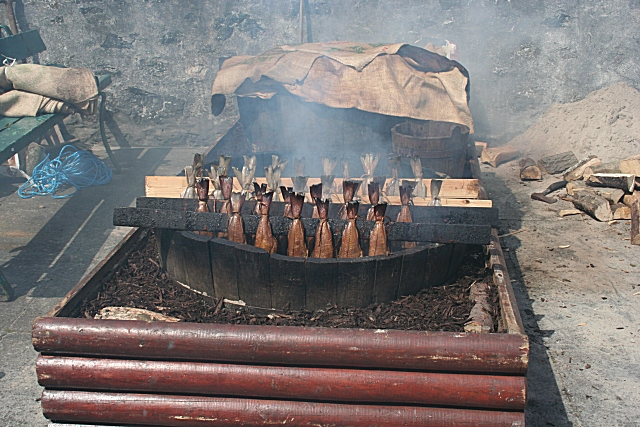
- Racks of haddock in a homemade smoker
- Alternative names: Smokies
- Type: Fish
- Place of origin: Scotland
- Region or state: Angus
- Serving temperature: Hot
- Main ingredients: Haddock, salt
- Similar dishes: Finnan haddie, Kipper

The Arbroath smokie is a type of smoked haddock named after the town of Arbroath in Angus, Scotland.

== History ==
The Arbroath smokie is said to have originated in the small fishing village of Auchmithie, 3 mi (5 km) northeast of Arbroath. Local legend has it a store caught fire one night, destroying barrels of haddock preserved in salt. The following morning, the people found some of the barrels had caught fire, cooking the haddock inside. Inspection revealed the haddock to be quite tasty. It is much more likely the villagers were of Scandinavian descent, as the 'Smokie making' process is similar to smoking methods which are still employed in areas of Scandinavia.

Towards the end of the 19th century, as Arbroath's fishing industry died, the Town Council offered the fisherfolk from Auchmithie land in an area of the town known as the fit o' the toon. It also offered them use of the modern harbour. Much of the Auchmithie population then relocated, bringing the Arbroath Smokie recipe with them. Today, 15 local businesses produce Arbroath smokies, selling them in major supermarkets in the UK and online.

In 2004, the European Commission registered the designation "Arbroath smokies" as a Protected Geographical Indication under the EU's Protected Food Name Scheme, acknowledging its unique status.

== Preparation ==
Arbroath smokies are prepared using traditional methods dating back to the late 1800s.

The fish are first salted overnight. They are then tied in pairs using hemp twine, and left overnight to dry. Once they have been salted, tied and dried, they are hung over a triangular length of wood to smoke. This "kiln stick" fits between the two tied smokies, one fish on either side. The sticks are then used to hang the dried fish in a special barrel containing a hardwood fire.

When the fish are hung over the fire, the top of the barrel is covered with a lid and sealed around the edges with wet jute sacks (the water prevents the jute sacks from catching fire). All of this serves to create a very hot, humid and smoky fire. The intense heat and thick smoke is essential, if the fish are to be cooked, not burned, and to have the strong, smoky taste and smell people expect from Arbroath smokies. Typically in less than an hour of smoking, the fish are ready to eat.

== Gallery ==
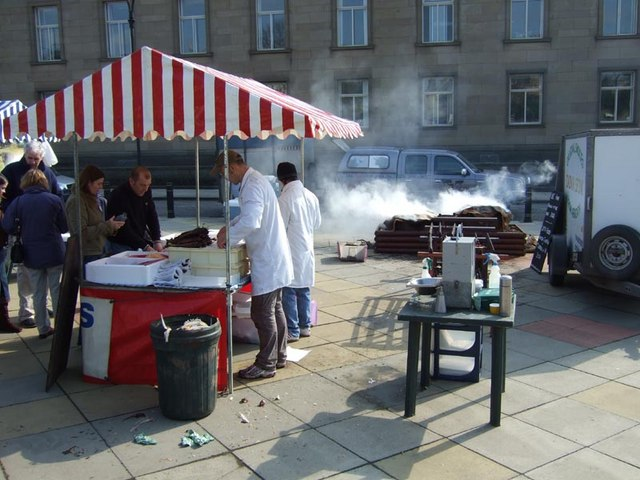
Arbroath smokies at the Kirkcaldy Farmer's Market

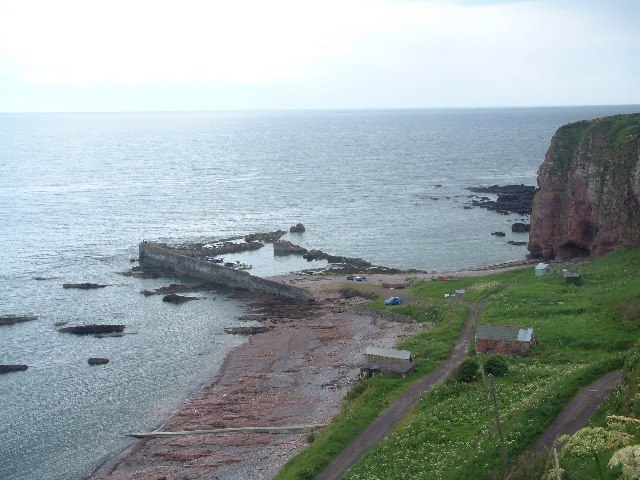
Auchmithie Harbour. Auchmithie is the true home of the "Arbroath" smokie

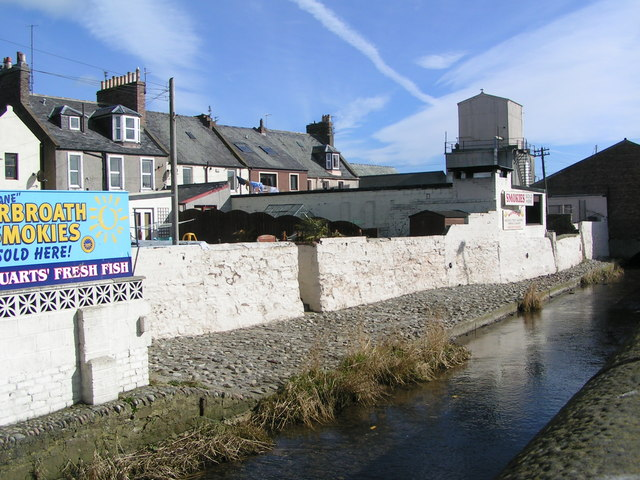
Brothock Burn, traditional home of the fishers. There are still smokehouses in back gardens to produce the Arbroath smokie

== See also ==
- Finnan haddie
- List of smoked foods
- Scottish cuisine
