= M. proximus =

M. proximus may refer to:

- Menemerus proximus, a jumping spider species in the genus Menemerus
- Merenius proximus, a corinnid sac spider species in the genus Merenius
- Mermessus proximus, a money spider species in the genus Mermessus
- Microgadus proximus, a fish species in the genus Microgadus

== See also ==
- Proximus (disambiguation)
