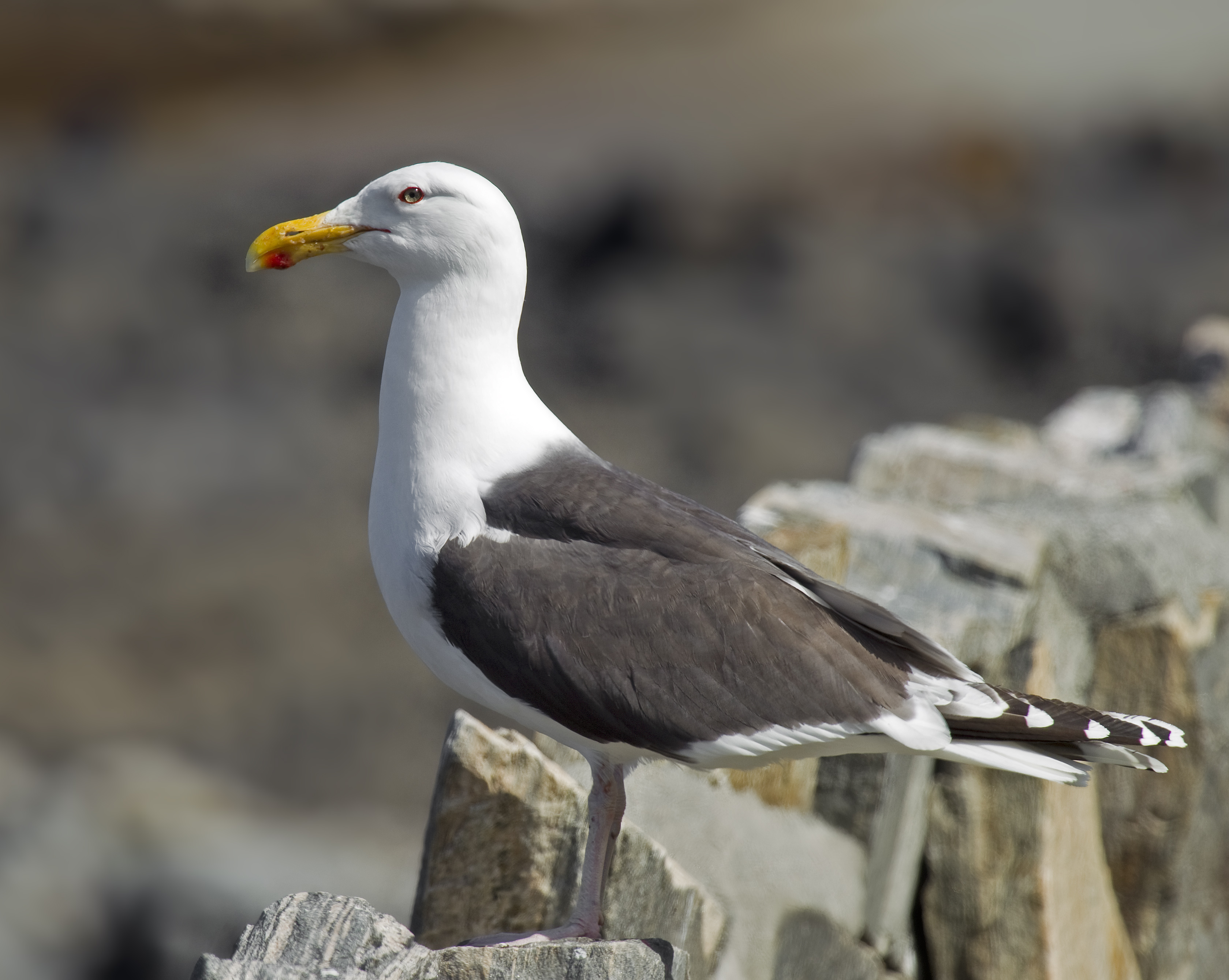

Conservation status
- Least Concern (IUCN 3.1)

Scientific classification
- Kingdom: Animalia
- Phylum: Chordata
- Class: Aves
- Order: Charadriiformes
- Family: Laridae
- Genus: Larus
- Species: L. marinus

Binomial name
- Larus marinus Linnaeus, 1758
- Distribution across the Northern Hemisphere. Breeding summer visitor Breeding resident Passage Non-breeding wintering visitor

Audio
- Sound

= Great black-backed gull =

Species of bird

The great black-backed gull (Larus marinus) is the largest member of the gull and tern family Laridae. It is a very aggressive hunter, pirate and scavenger which breeds on the North Atlantic coasts and islands of northern Europe and northeastern North America. Southern populations are generally sedentary, while those breeding in the far north (northern Norway, northwest Russia) migrate farther south in winter. A few also move inland to large lakes and reservoirs. The adult has a white head, neck and underparts, dark blackish-grey wings and back, pink legs and the bill yellow with a red spot.

== Taxonomy ==
The great black-backed gull was one of the many species originally described by Carl Linnaeus in his 1758 10th edition of Systema Naturae, and it still bears its original scientific name of Larus marinus. Larus appears to have referred to a gull or other large seabird. The specific name marinus means "marine", or when taken together, "sea gull". The name predates Linnean taxonomy, as it had been called Larus ingens marinus by Carolus Clusius.

The terms swaabie (from Norn: swartbak, lit. 'black back'), baagie and baigie (Norn: bagi, from Old Norse: bak, lit. 'back') are local names from the Shetland Islands. Francis Willughby called it the great black and white gull in the 17th century, noting that it was called the swarth-back in the Faroe Islands. The species is sometimes referred to as the greater black-backed gull.

== Description ==
This is the largest gull in the world, considerably larger than a herring gull (Larus argentatus); only two other gulls, glaucous gull (Larus hyperboreus) and Pallas's gull (Ichthyaetus ichthyaetus), come close to matching this species in size. It is 64–79 cm (25–31 in) long with a 1.5–1.7 m (4 ft 11 in – 5 ft 7 in) wingspan and a body weight of 0.75–2.3 kg (1 lb 10 oz – 5 lb 1 oz). In a sample of 2009 adults from the North Atlantic, males were on average 1,830 g (4 lb 1/2 oz) and females were on average 1,488 g (3 lb 4 1/2 oz). Some adult gulls with access to fisheries in the North Sea can weigh up to roughly 2.5 kg (5 1/2 lb) and averaged 1.96 kg (4 lb 5 oz). An exceptionally large glaucous gull was found to outweigh any known great black-backed gull, although usually that species is slightly smaller. The great black-backed gull is bulky and imposing in appearance with a large, powerful bill. The standard measurements are: the bill is 5.4 to 7.25 cm (2 1/8 to 2 7/8 in), the wing chord is 44.5 to 53 cm (17 1/2 to 20 3/4 in) and the tarsus is 6.6 to 8.8 cm (2 5/8 to 3 1/2 in).

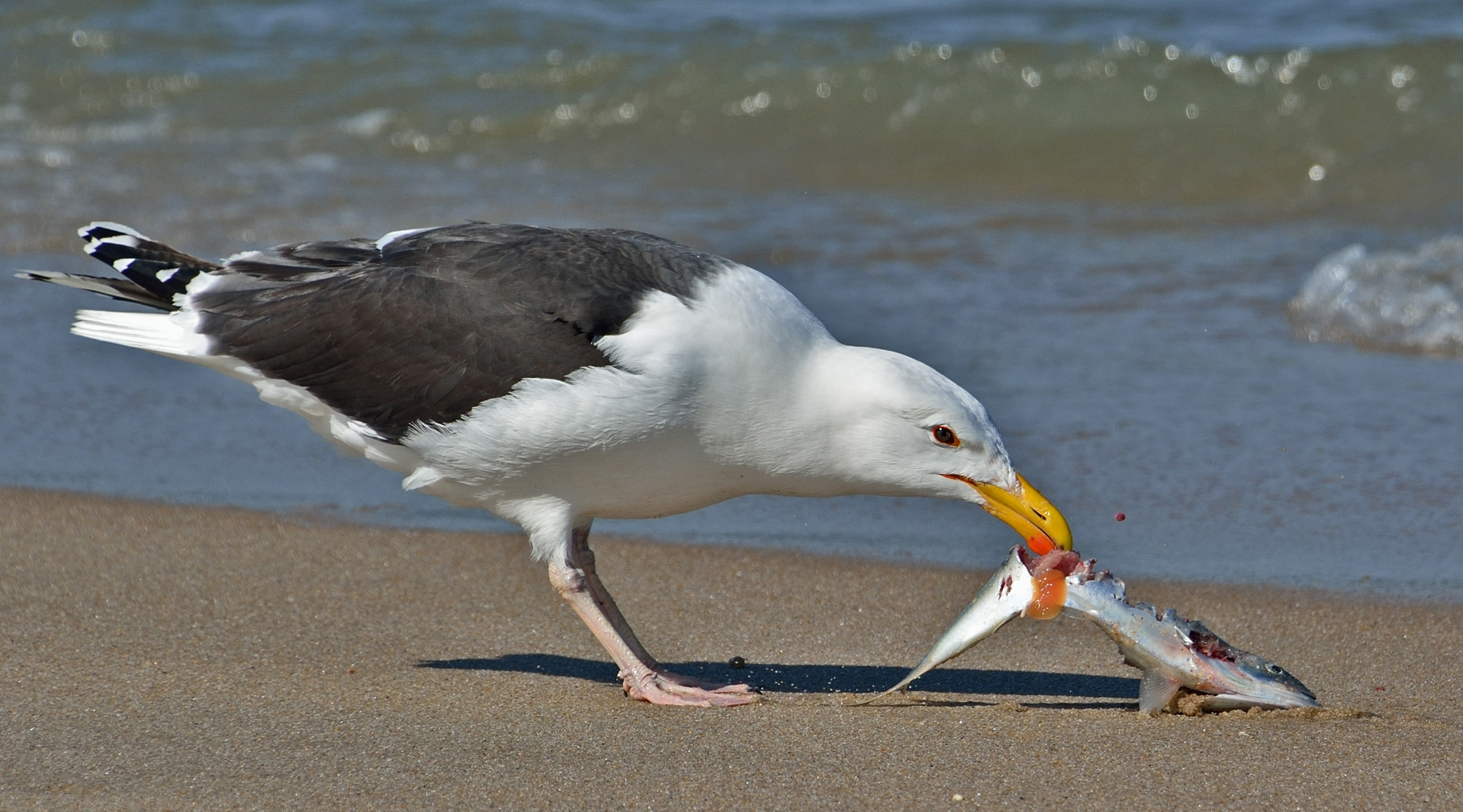
Adult Larus marinus with fish, Sandy Hook, New Jersey, United States

The adult great black-backed gull is fairly distinctive, as no other very large gull with black on its upper-wings generally occurs in the North Atlantic. In other white-headed North Atlantic gulls, the mantle is generally a lighter grey and, in some species, it is a light powdery grey or even pinkish. It is greyish-black on the wings and back, with conspicuous, contrasting white "mirrors" at the wing tips. The legs are pinkish, and the bill is yellow or yellow-pink with some orange or red near tip of lower bill. The adult lesser black-backed gull (L. fuscus) is distinctly smaller, typically weighing about half as much as a great black-back. The lesser black-back has yellowish legs and a mantle that can range from slate-grey to brownish but it is never as dark as the larger species. A few superficially similar dark-backed, fairly large gulls occur in the Pacific Ocean or in the tropics, all generally far outside this species' range, such as the slaty-backed (L. schistisagus), the western (L. occidentalis) and the kelp gull (L. dominicanus).

Juvenile birds of under a year old have scaly, checkered black-brown upper parts, the head and underparts streaked with grey brown, and a neat wing pattern. The face and nape are paler and the wing flight feathers are blackish-brown. The juvenile's tail is white with zigzag bars and spots at base and a broken blackish band near the tip. The bill of the juvenile is brownish-black with white tip and the legs dark bluish-grey with some pink tones. As the young gull ages, the grey-brown colour gradually fades to more contrasting plumage and the bill darkens to black before growing paler. By the third year, the young gulls resemble a streakier, dirtier-looking version of the adult. They take at least four years to reach maturity, development in this species being somewhat slower than that of other large gulls. The call is a deep "laughing" cry, kaa-ga-ga, with the first note sometimes drawn out in an almost bovid-like sound. The voice is distinctly deeper than most other gull species.

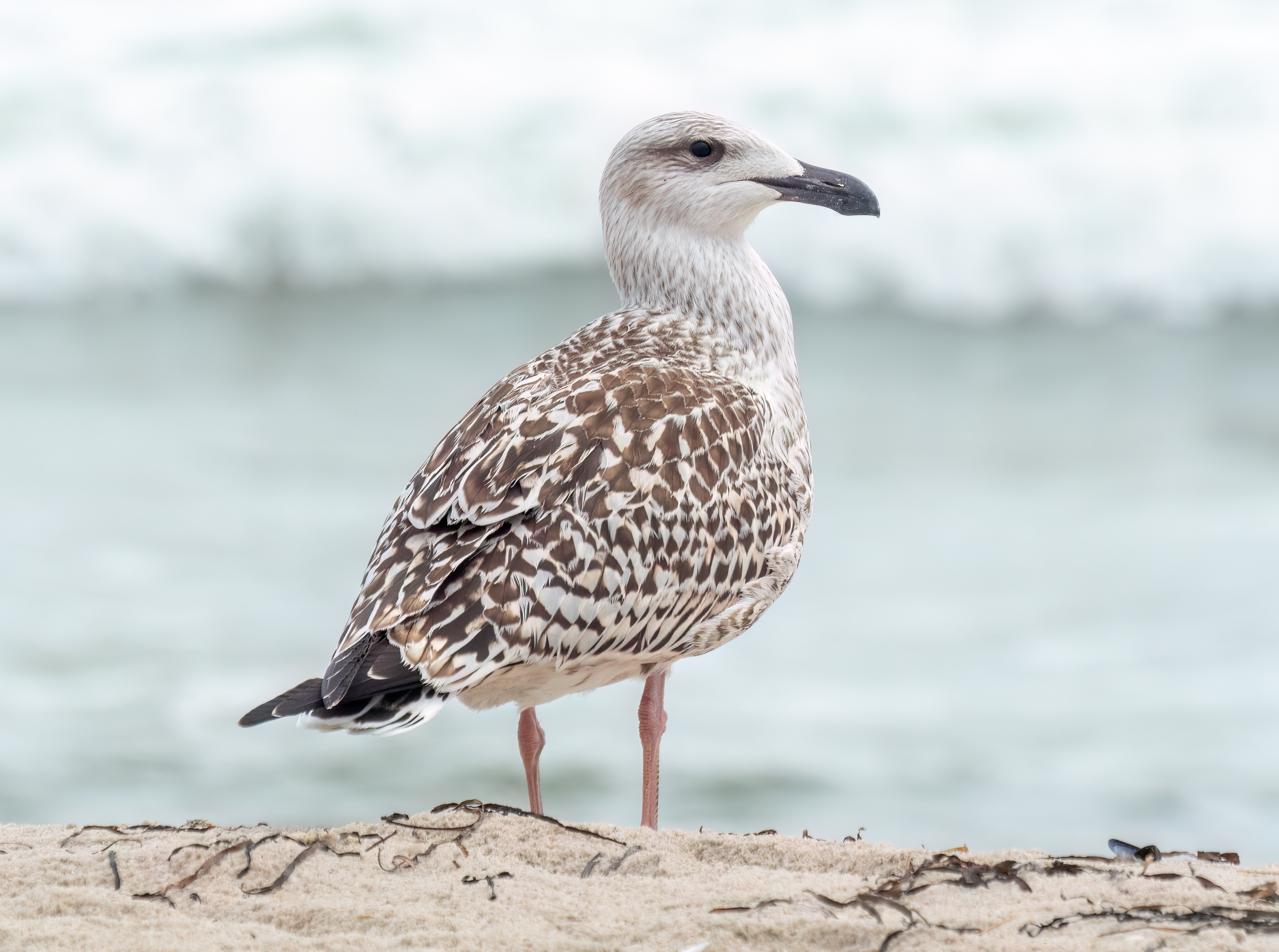
First winter

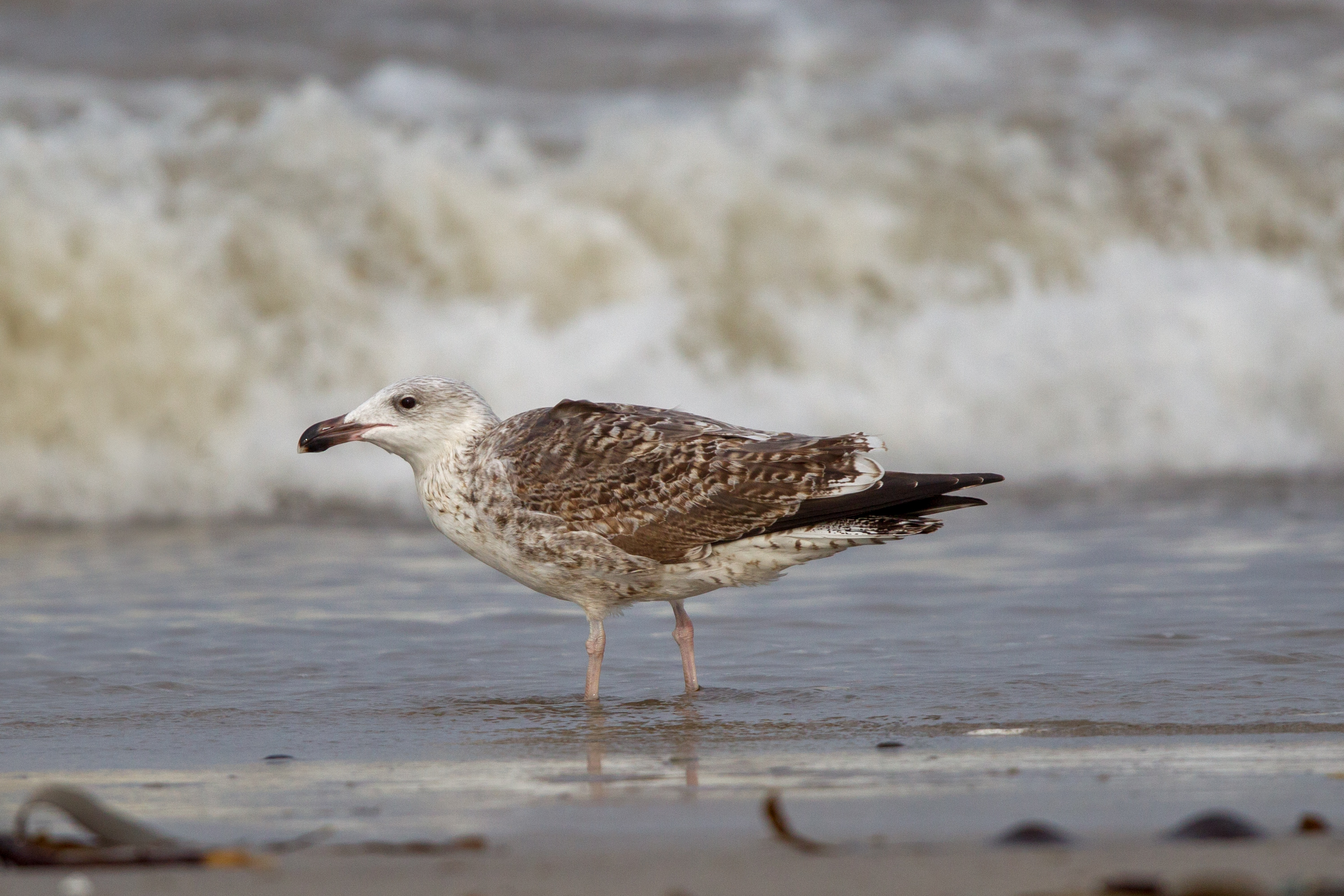
Second winter

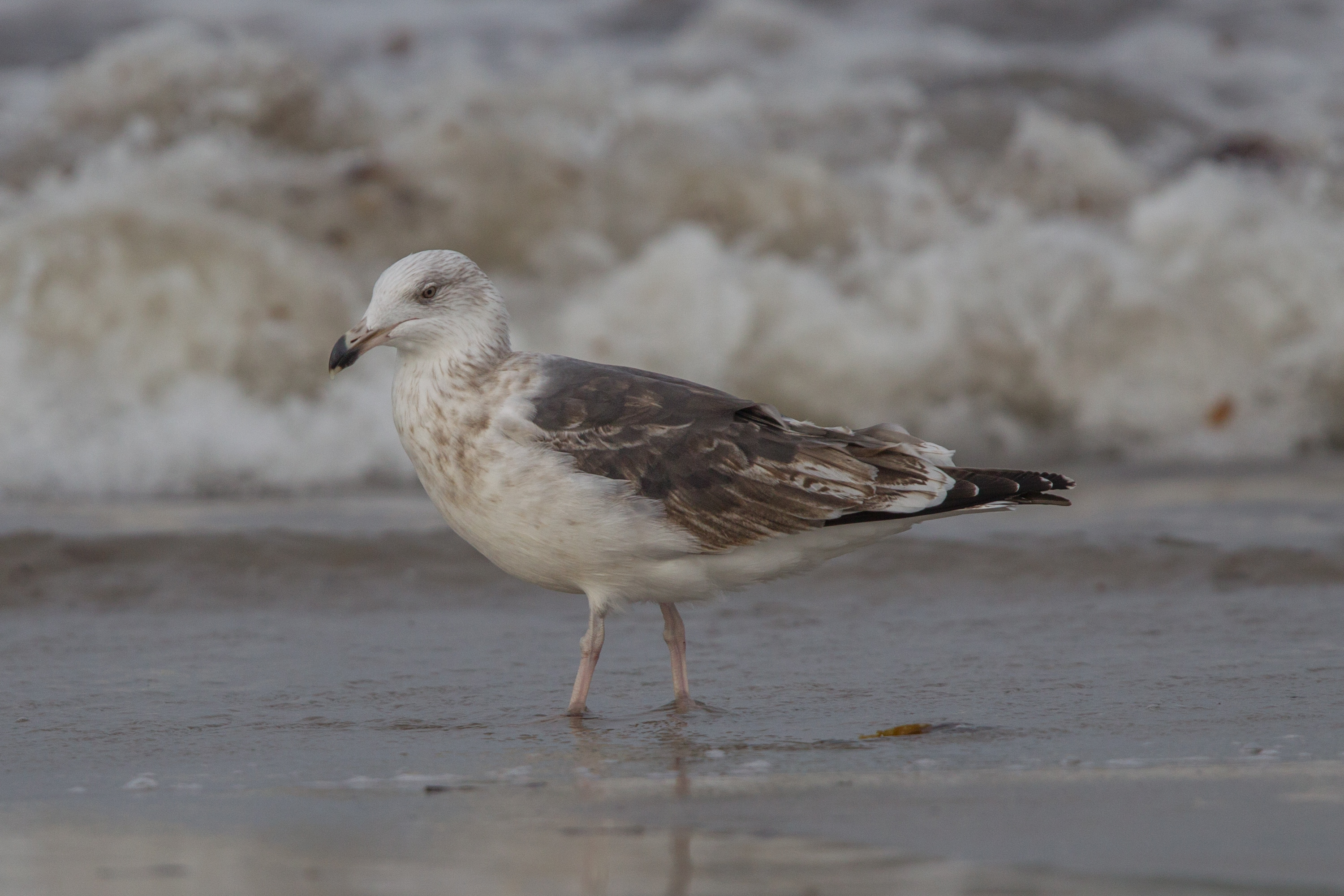
Third winter

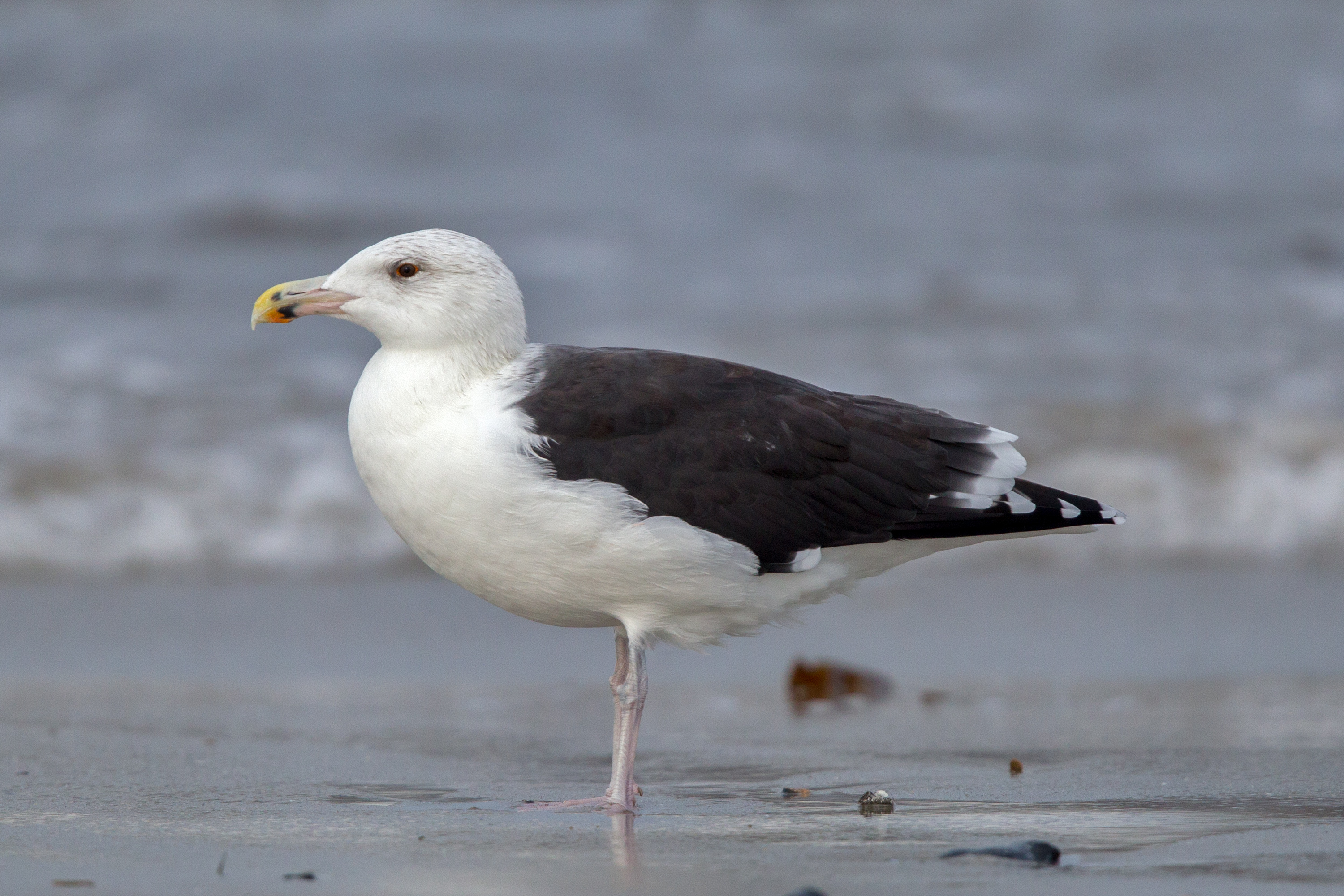
Fourth winter

== Distribution and habitat ==
This species can be found breeding in coastal areas from the extreme northwest portion of Russia, through much of coastal Scandinavia, on the Baltic Sea coasts, to the coasts of northwestern France, the United Kingdom and Ireland. Across the northern portion of the Atlantic, this gull is distributed in Iceland, the Faroe Islands, southern Greenland and on the Atlantic coasts of Canada and the United States. Though formerly mainly just a non-breeding visitor south of Canada in North America, the species has spread to include several colonies in the New England states and now breeds as far south as North Carolina. Individuals breeding in harsher environments will migrate south, wintering on northern coasts of Europe from the Baltic Sea to southern Portugal, and regularly down to coastal Florida in North America. During the winter in the Baltic Sea, the bird usually stays close to the ice boundary. North of the Åland islands, the sea often freezes all the way from Sweden to Finland, and then the bird migrates to open waters. Exceptionally, the species can range as far south as the Caribbean and off the coast of northern South America.

The great black-backed gull is found in a variety of coastal habitats, including rocky and sandy coasts and estuaries, as well as inland wetland habitats, such as lakes, ponds, rivers, wet fields and moorland. They are generally found within striking distance of large bodies of water while ranging inland. Today, it is a common fixture at refuse dumps both along coasts and relatively far inland. The species also makes extensive use of dredge spoils, which, in the state of New Jersey, are their most prevalent nesting sites. It generally breeds in areas free of or largely inaccessible to terrestrial predators, such as vegetated islands, sand dunes, flat-topped stacks, building roofs and sometimes amongst bushes on salt marsh islands. During the winter, the great black-backed gull often travels far out to sea to feed.

== Diet ==
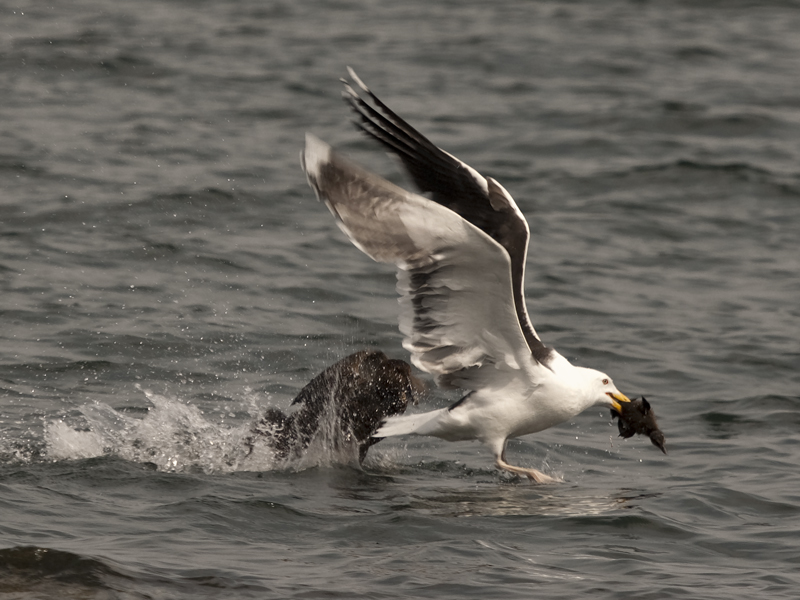
Great black-backed gull grabs a common eider duckling while an adult female eider attempts pursuit

Great black-backed gulls are opportunistic feeders, apex predators of the oceanic sky, and are very curious. They will investigate any small organism they encounter and will readily eat almost anything that they can swallow. They get much of their dietary energy from scavenging, with refuse, most provided directly by humans, locally constituting more than half of their diet. The proliferation of garbage or refuse dumps has become a major attractant to this and all other non-specialised gull species in its range. A study to investigate how much time they spend foraging at refuse dumps in Massachusetts found great black-backed gulls were only observed actively foraging 19% of their time there, eating less garbage than other common gulls, and spent most of their time roosting or loafing.

Like most gulls, great black-backed gulls regularly capture fish, and any fish smaller than themselves found close to the surface of the water are potential prey. Stomach contents of great black-backed gulls usually show fish to be the primary food. On Sable Island in Nova Scotia, 25% of the stomach contents consisted of fish, but 96% of the regurgitations given to young consisted of fish. Similarly, on Great Island in Newfoundland, 25% of the stomach contents were fish but 68% of regurgitants were fish. The most regularly reported fish eaten in Nova Scotia and Newfoundland were capelin (Mallotus villosus), Atlantic cod (Gadus morhua), Atlantic tomcod (Microgadus tomcod), Atlantic mackerel (Scomber scombrus), Atlantic herring (Clupea harengus) and sand lance (Ammodytes hexapterus). Other prey often includes various squid and mollusks, Jonah crabs (Cancer borealis), rock crabs (Cancer irroratus), green crabs (Carcinus maenas) and other crustaceans, and sea urchins, starfish (Asterias forbesi and Asterias rubens) and other echinoderms when they come across the opportunity. From observations in northern New England, 23% of observed prey was echinoderms and 63% was crustaceans.

Unlike most other Larus gulls, great black-backed gulls are highly predatory and frequently hunt and kill any prey smaller than themselves, behaving more like a raptor than a typical gull. Lacking the razor-sharp talons and curved, tearing beak of a raptor, the great black-backed gull relies on aggression, physical strength and endurance when hunting. When attacking other animals, they usually attack seabird eggs, nestlings or fledglings at the nest, perhaps most numerously terns, but also including smaller gull species as well as eiders, gannets and various alcids. In Newfoundland and Nova Scotia, 10% of the stomach contents of great black-backed gulls was made up of birds, while a further 17% of stomach contents was made up of tern eggs alone. Adult or fledged juveniles of various bird species have also been predaceously attacked. Some fully-fledged or adult birds observed to be hunted in flight or on the ground by great black-backed gulls have included Anas ducks, ruddy ducks (Oxyura jamaicensis), buffleheads (Bucephala albeola), Manx shearwaters (Puffinus puffinus), pied-billed grebes (Podilymbus podiceps), common moorhens (Gallinula chloropus), terns, Atlantic puffins (Fratercula arctica), Little auks (Alle alle), coots (Fulica ssp.), glossy ibises (Plegadis falcinellus), rock doves (Columba livia) and even predatory birds such as hen harriers (Circus cyaneus). When attacking other flying birds, the great black-backed gulls often pursue them on the wing and attack them by jabbing with their bill, hoping to bring down the other bird either by creating an open wound or simply via exhaustion. They may kill healthy adult birds weighing up to at least 750 g (26 oz) but take exclusively the small young of larger birds such as common eider (Somateria mollissima) and cormorants. They will also catch flying passerines, which they typically target while the small birds are exhausted from migration and swallow them immediately. Great black-backed gull also feed on land animals, including rats (Rattus ssp.) at garbage dumps, rabbits (Oryctolagus cuniculus) and even sickly lambs (Ovis aries).

Adult great black-backed gull steals a bird carcass from a juvenile of the same species, then swallows it whole

Most foods are swallowed whole, including most fish and even other gulls. When foods are too large to be swallowed at once, they will sometimes be shaken in the bill until they fall apart into pieces. Like some other gulls, when capturing molluscs or other hard-surfaced foods such as eggs, they will fly into the air with it and drop it on rocks or hard earth to crack it open. Alternative foods, including berries and insects, are also eaten when available, and they will readily exploit easy food sources, including chum lines made by boats at sea. They are skilled kleptoparasites who will readily pirate fish and other prey captured by other birds, and their size allows them to dominate over other gulls when encountering them. At tern colonies in coastal Maine, American herring gulls (L. smithsonianus) occasionally also attack nestling and fledgling terns but in a great majority of cases their catch were immediately pirated by great black-backs. In one observation, an adult great black-back was seen to rob a female peregrine falcon (Falco peregrinus) of a freshly caught gadwall (Anas strepera). In another case, a third-year great black-back was observed fighting an adult female northern goshawk (Accipiter gentilis) off its kill, although the goshawk attempted to strike the gull before leaving. Due to their method of using intimidation while encountering other water and raptorial birds, the species has been referred to as a "merciless tyrant". Naturally, these gulls are attracted to the surface activity of large marine animals, from Atlantic bluefin tuna (Thunnus thynnus) to humpback whales (Megaptera novaeangliae), to capture fish driven to the surface by such creatures.

== Breeding ==
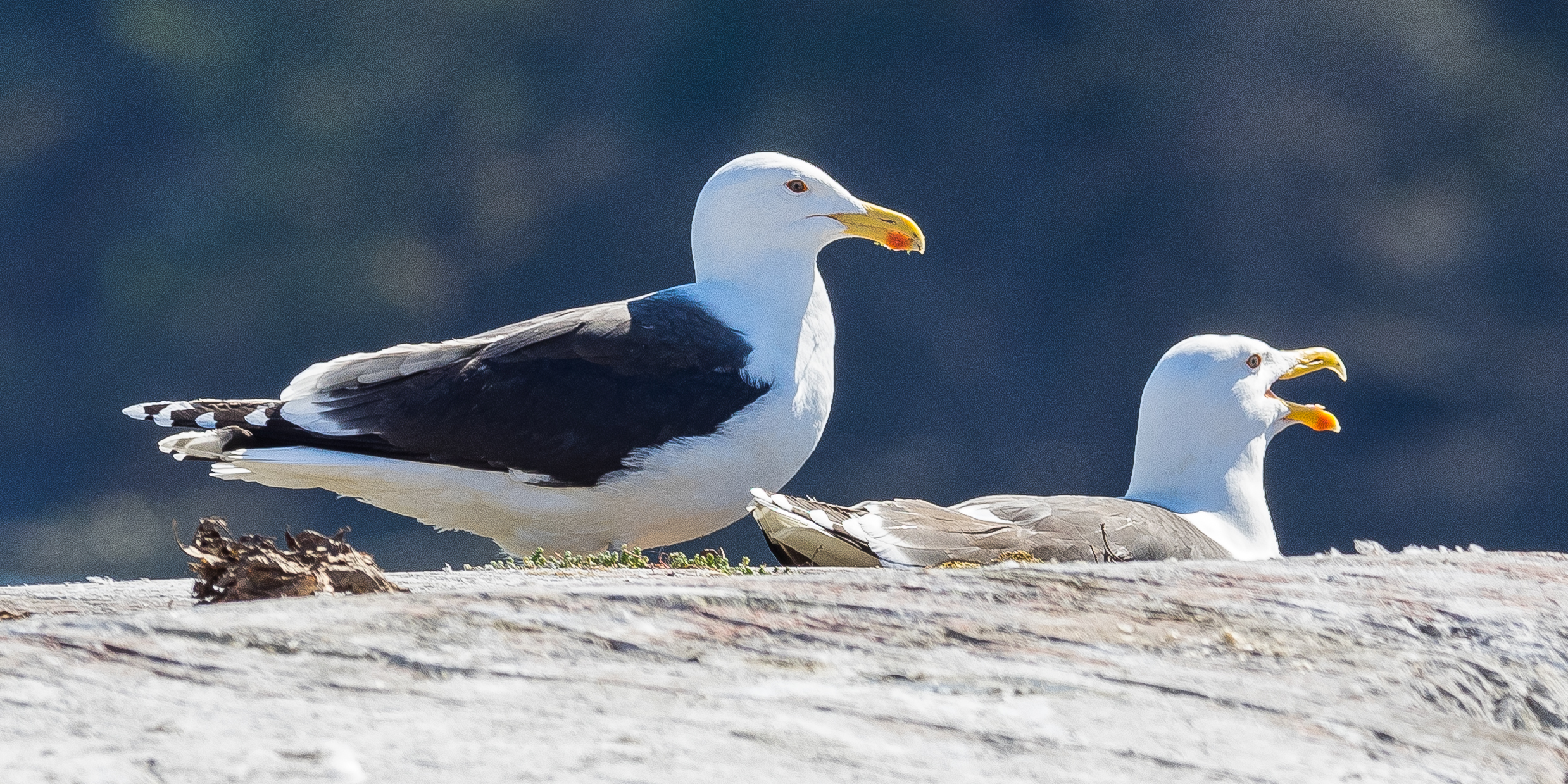
Great black-backed gulls nesting in Sweden

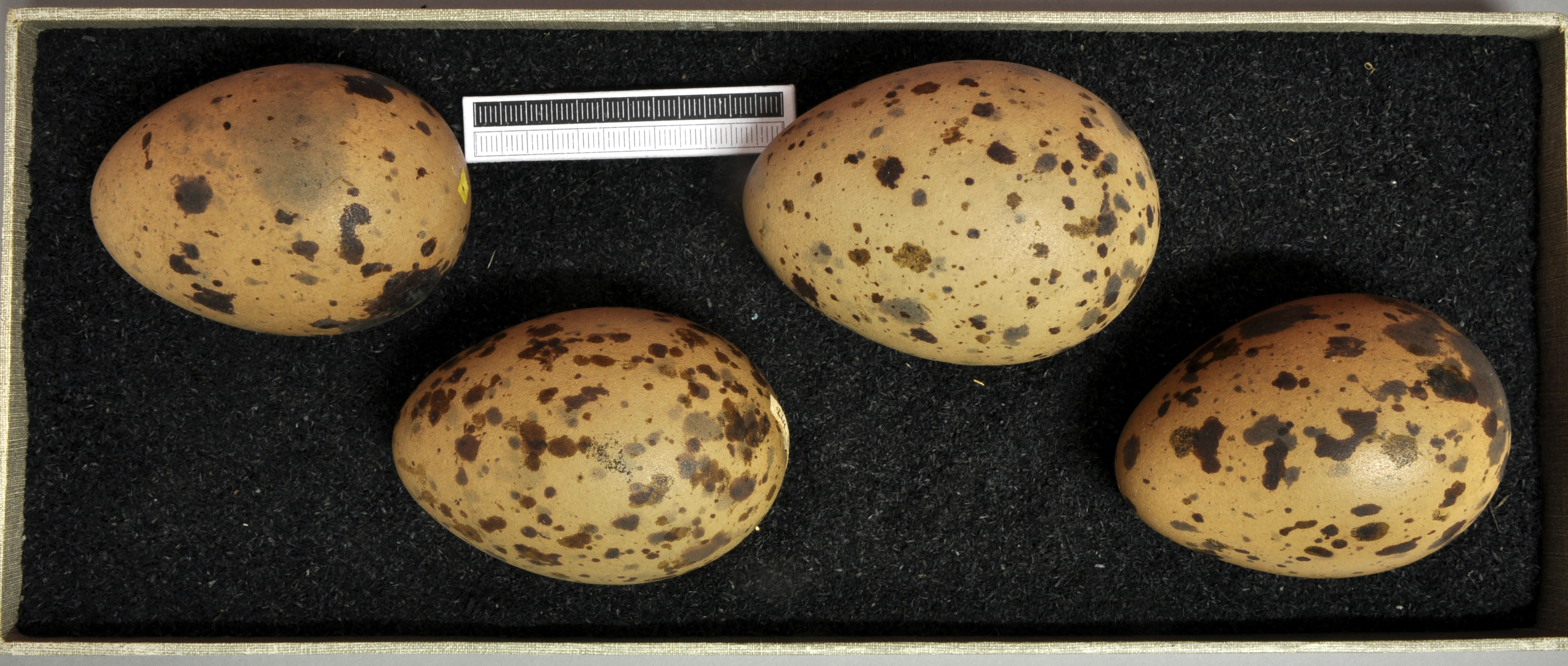
Eggs, Collection Museum Wiesbaden

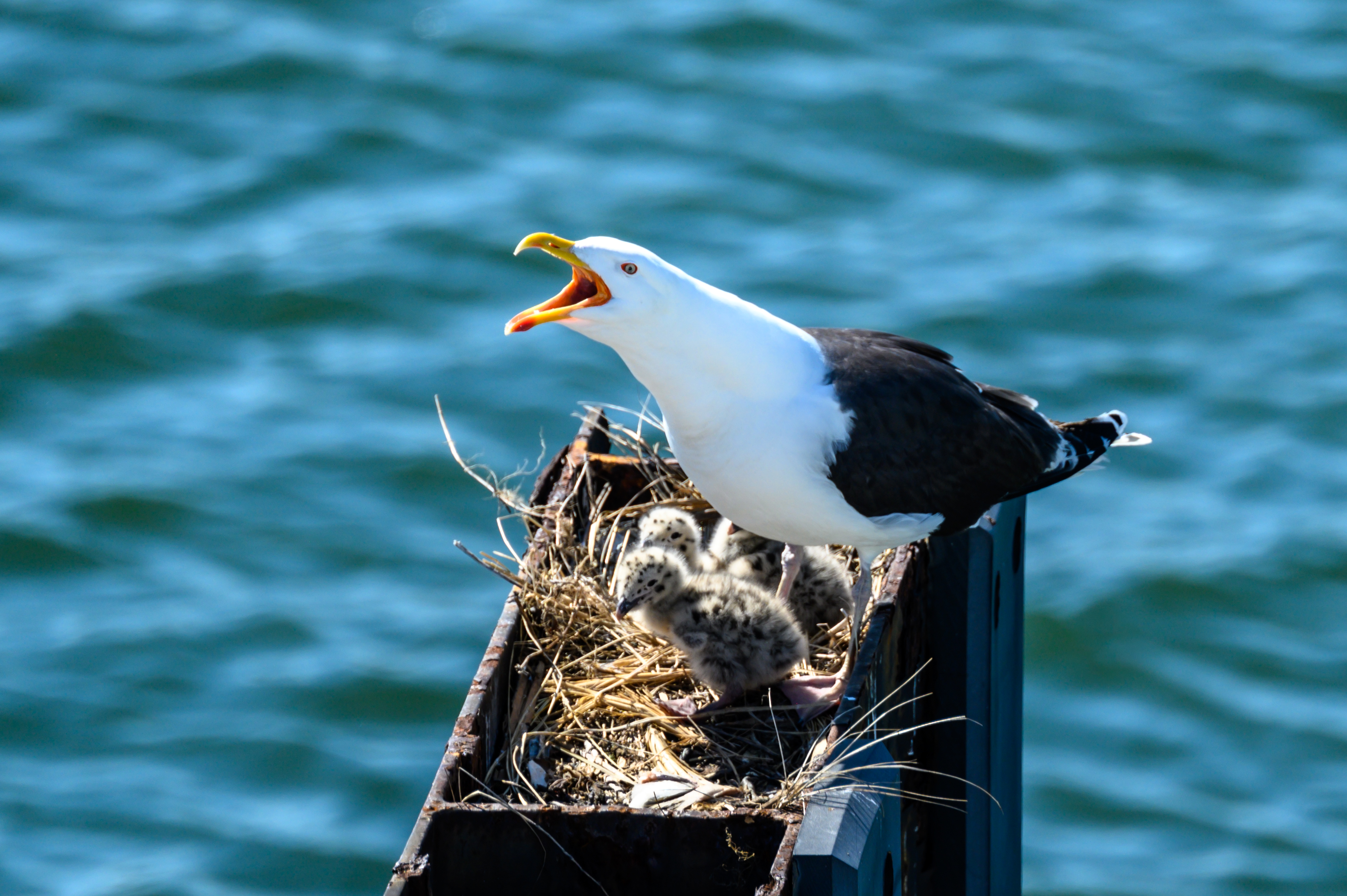
Female great black-backed gull, with chicks

Great black-backed gulls breed singly or in small colonies, sometimes in the middle of a European herring gull (Larus argentatus) colony. Young adult pair formation occurs in March or April. The following spring the same birds usually form a pair again, meeting at the previous year's nest. If one of the birds does not appear, the other bird begins looking for a new mate. Usually a single bird does not breed successfully in that season.

They make a lined nest on the ground often on top of a rocky stack, fallen log or other obstructing object which can protect the eggs from the elements. Usually, several nest scrapes are made before the one deemed best by the parents is selected and then lined with grass, seaweed or moss or objects such as rope or plastic. When nesting on roofs in urban environments, previous year's nests are often reused over and over again. The female lays usually three eggs sometime between late April and late June. When only two eggs are found in a nest, the reason is almost always that one egg, for one reason or another, has been destroyed. It takes around one week for the female to produce the three eggs, and the incubation does not begin until all three eggs are laid, so all three chicks hatch on the same day. The birds are usually successful in bringing up all the three chicks.

The eggs are greenish-brown with dark speckles and blotches. Both parents participate in the incubation stage, which lasts for approximately 28 days. During this time, the birds attempt to avoid being noticed and stay silent. The breeding pair are devoted parents who both take shifts brooding the young, defending the nest and gathering food. Young great black-backed gulls leave the nest area at 50 days of age and may remain with their parents for an overall period of around six months, though most fledglings choose to congregate with other immature gulls in the search for food by fall. These gulls reach breeding maturity when they obtain adult plumage at four years, though may not successfully breed until they are six years old.

== Longevity and mortality ==
The great black-backed gull is a relatively long-lived bird. The maximum recorded age for a wild great black-backed gull is 27.1 years. This species is rarely kept in captivity, but domestically kept European herring gulls have been known to live for over 44 years and generally larger birds can outlive smaller ones. Mortality typically occurs in the early stages of life, when harsh weather conditions (including flooding) and starvation can threaten them, as well as predators. Chicks and eggs are preyed on by crows (Corvus ssp.), cats (Felis catus), other gulls, raccoons (Procyon lotor) and rats (Rattus ssp.). The bald eagle (Haliaeetus leucocephalus), white-tailed eagle (H. albicilla) and golden eagle (Aquila chrysaetos) are the only birds known to habitually predate healthy, fully grown great black-backed gulls. In one study from Norway, great black-backed gulls were the fifth highest frequency prey item for white-tailed eagles and gulls are prone to mobbing these huge eagles. The great black-backed gull has also been observed engaging in aerial combat with bald eagles, attacking the eagles and chasing them away. A great skua (Stercorarius skua) was filmed in Scotland unsuccessfully attempting to kill a second or third year great black-backed gull. In Norway, great black-backed gulls have also been reported to fall prey to Eurasian eagle-owls (Bubo bubo). Killer whales (Orcinus orca) and sharks also reportedly prey upon adult and juvenile birds at sea. In some biomes, where large eagles are absent the great black-backed gull may be considered the apex predator.

== Status ==
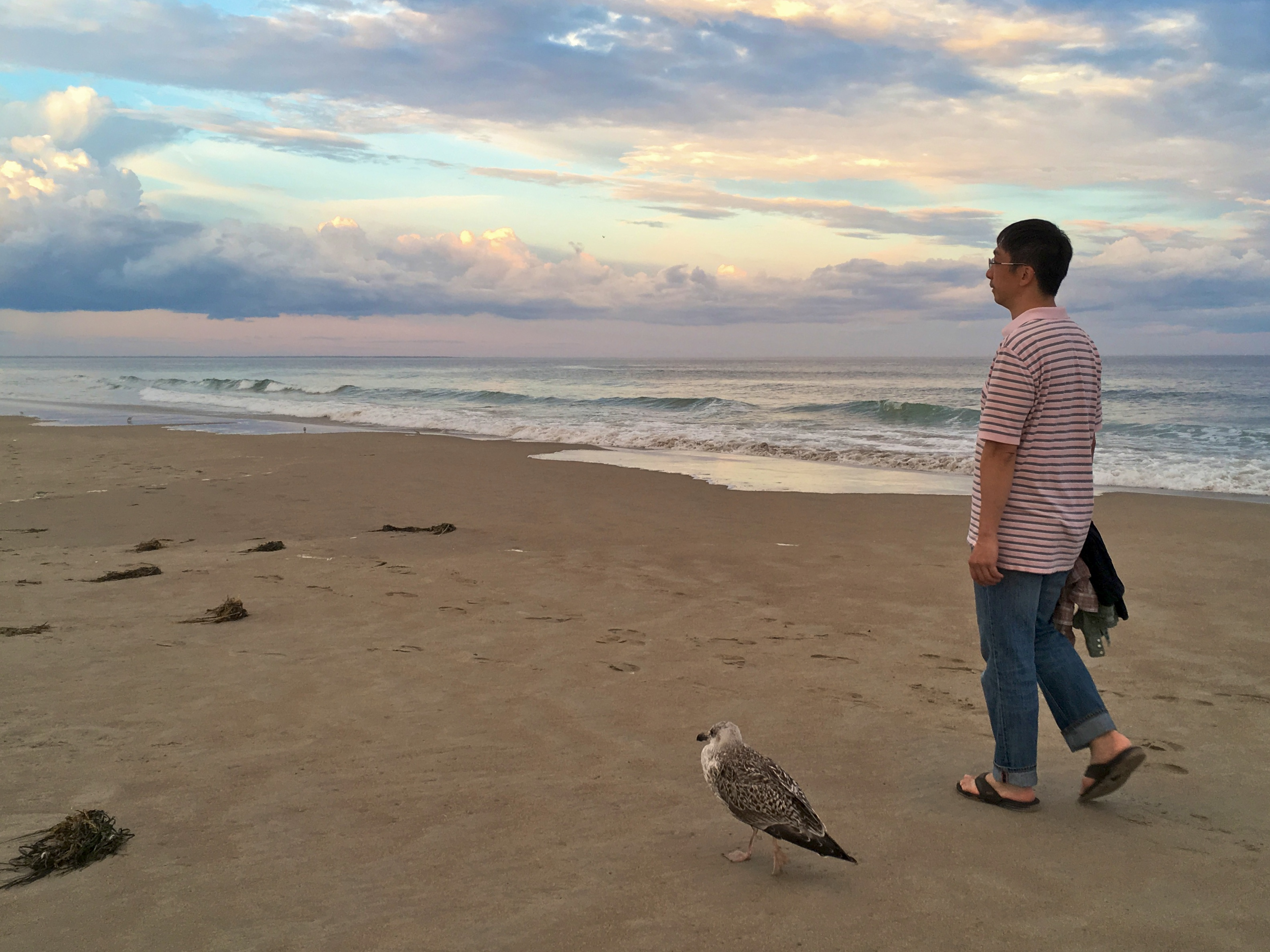
Juvenile walking alongside a human at Ogunquit Beach

Historically, the great black-backed gull was shot as a hunting trophy ("after about 1850 ... smaller gulls were shot remorselessly for little more than target practice but the Great Black-backed Gull was a prize worth displaying") and harvested for its feathers, which were used in the hat-making trade; as a result the species became locally extinct from particularly southern parts of its range as a result of this exploitation. Today, however, its adaptability to human presence and the use of urban environments as artificial nesting sites has resulted in the great black-backed gull rapidly increasing in number and range. It is now a widespread and abundant species in its range and its numbers have increased to such high levels in some areas that it is often seen as a pest species, especially near airports where it risks collisions with airplanes, and in some coastal areas where it sometimes outcompetes or hunts rarer seabirds, such as Atlantic puffins, possibly resulting in conservationist intervention. The increase and expansion of great black-backed gulls has been attributed to increasing winter fishery activities in the North Sea. Although there are no known major threats to the great black-backed gull, high levels of toxic pollutants, which are ingested with contaminated prey, are often found in individuals and eggs, reducing reproductive success. Breeding is also interrupted by human disturbance, which can lead to eggs being abandoned, leaving them vulnerable to exposure and predation.

== Gallery ==
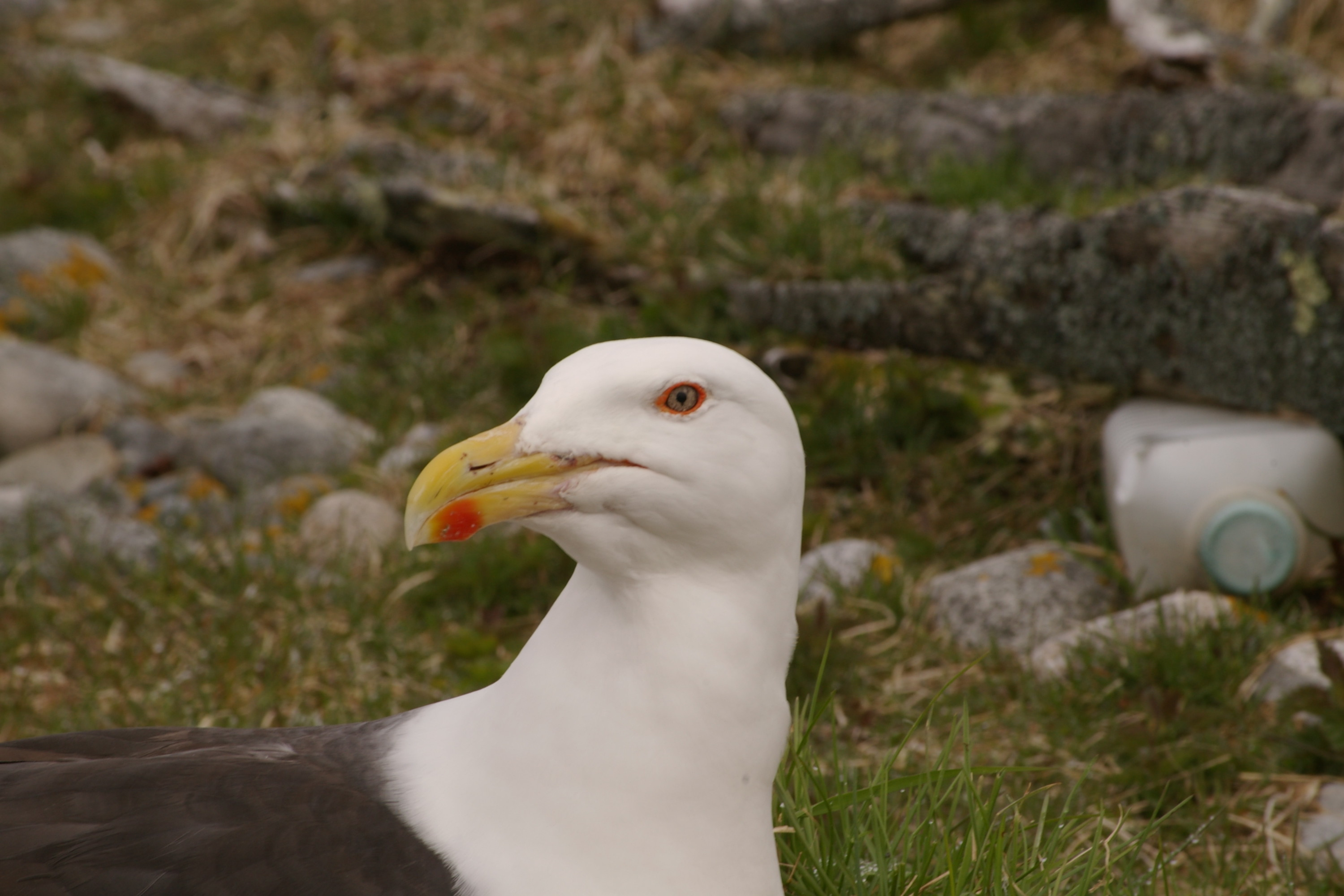
Great black-backed gull has a bulky, powerful beak

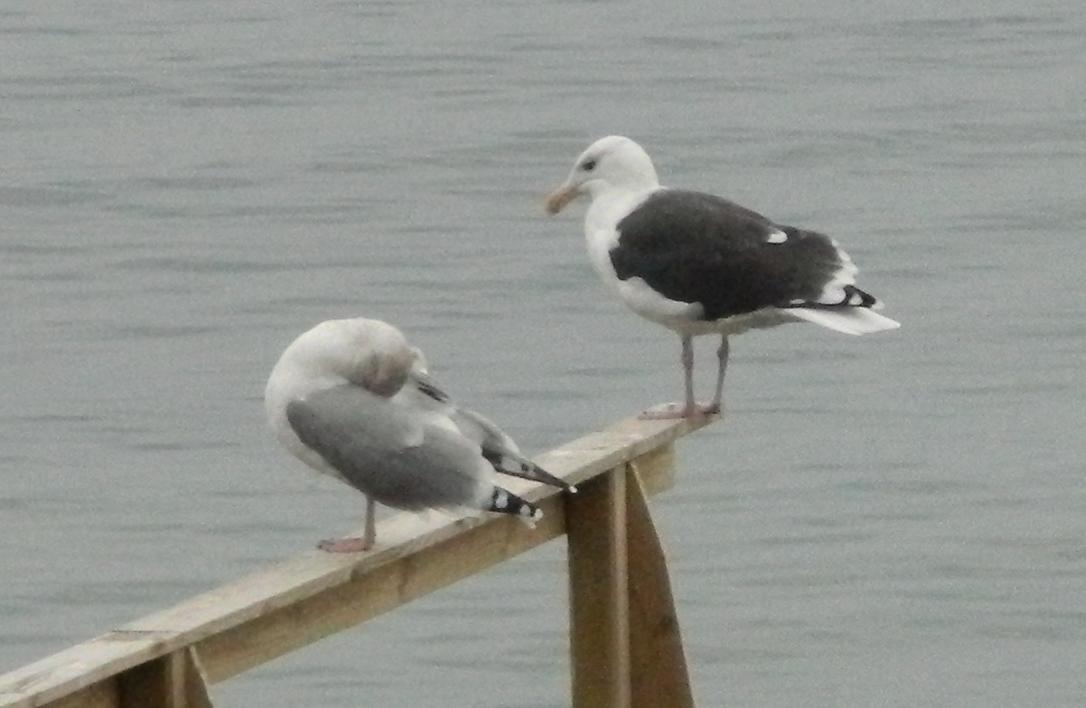
Larus marinus and Larus argentatus together, Øresund

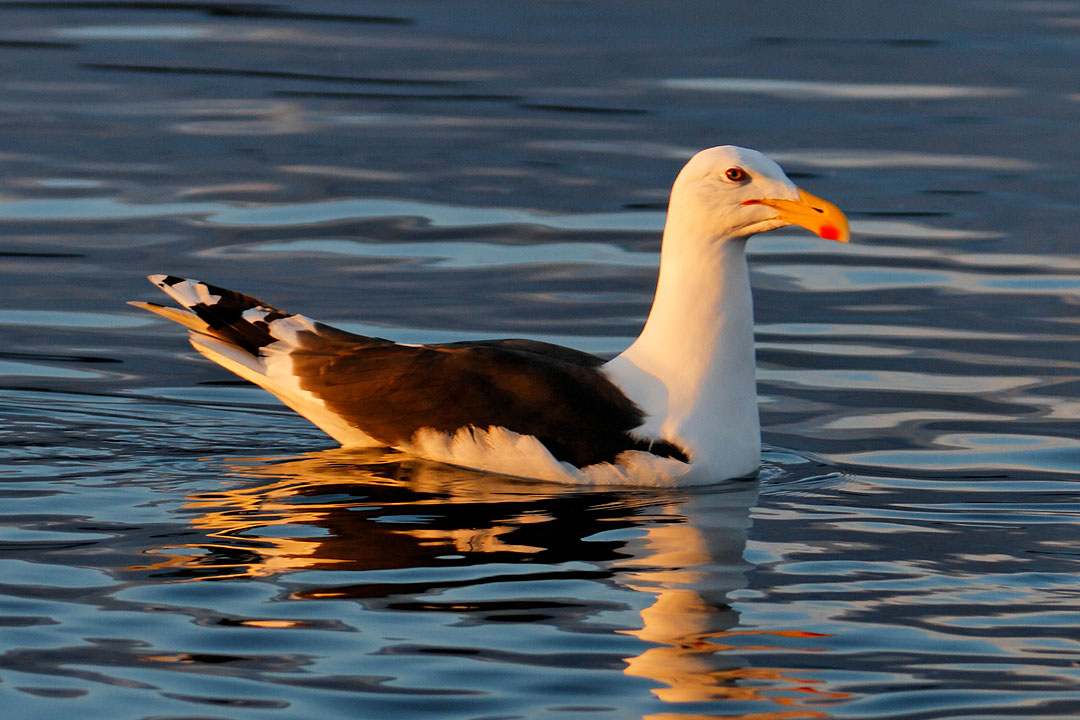

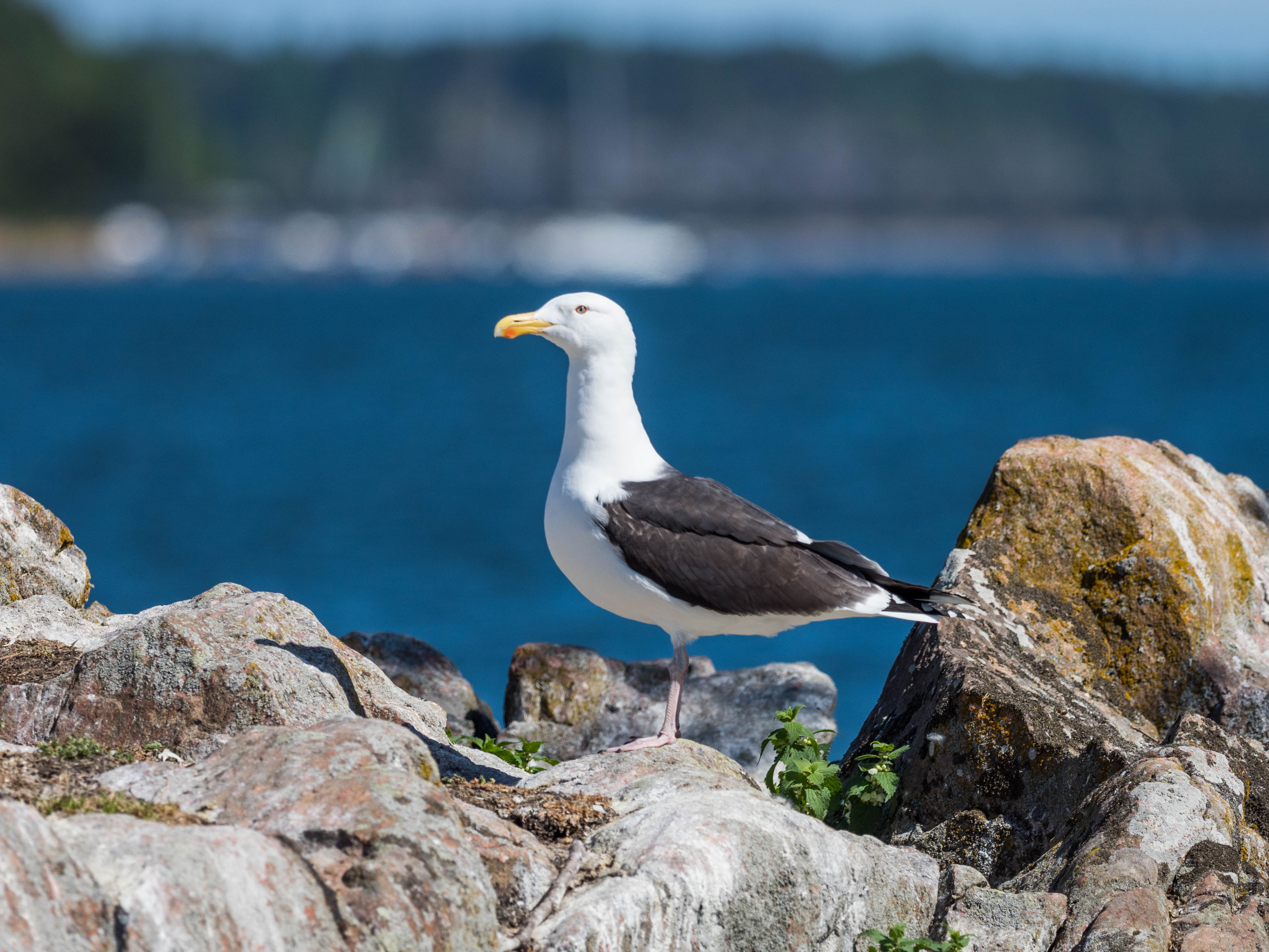

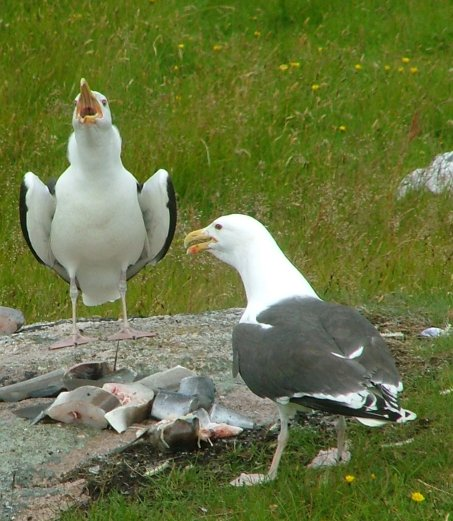
Great black-backed gulls displaying

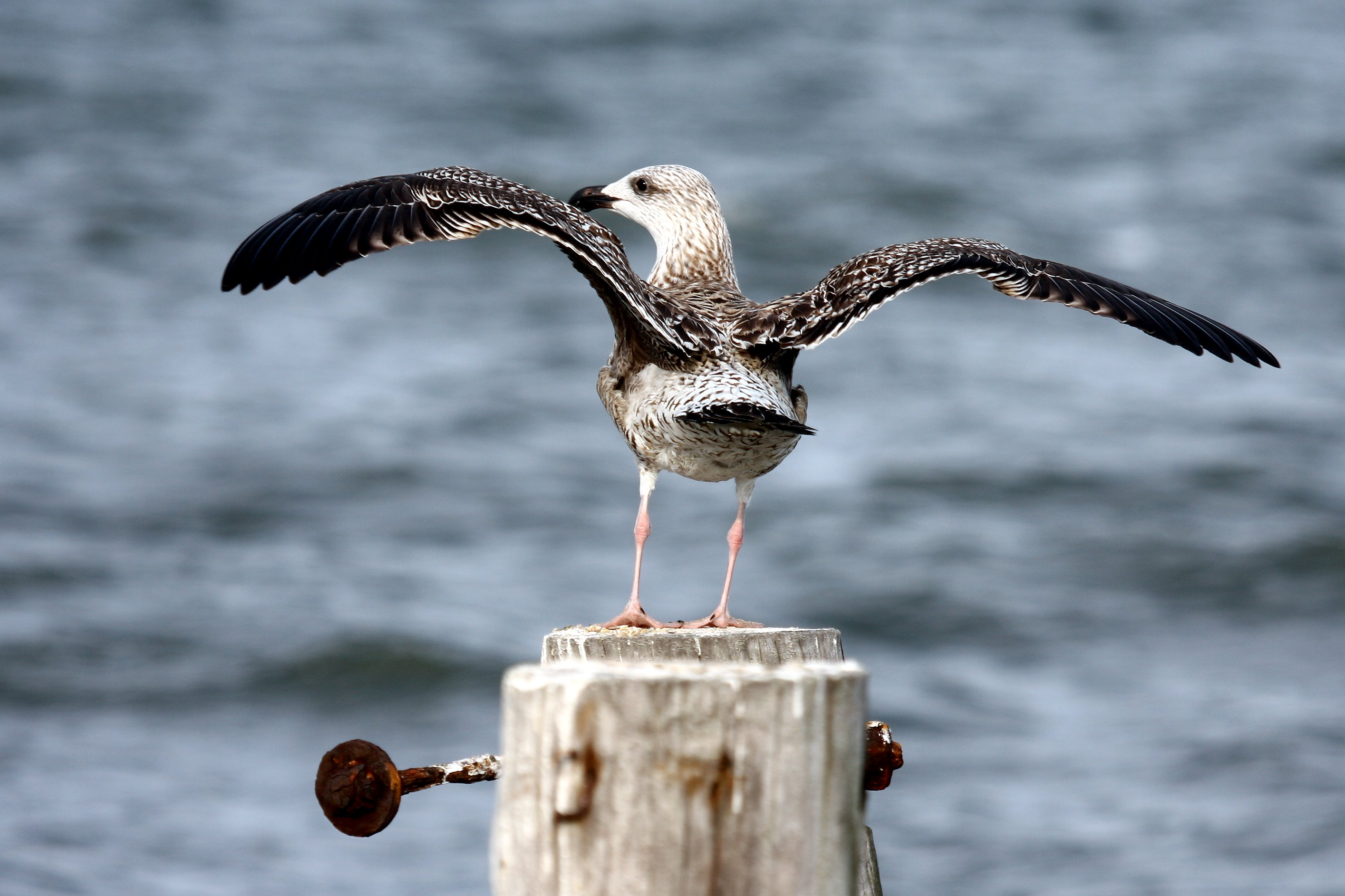
Juvenile, Cape May Point, New Jersey

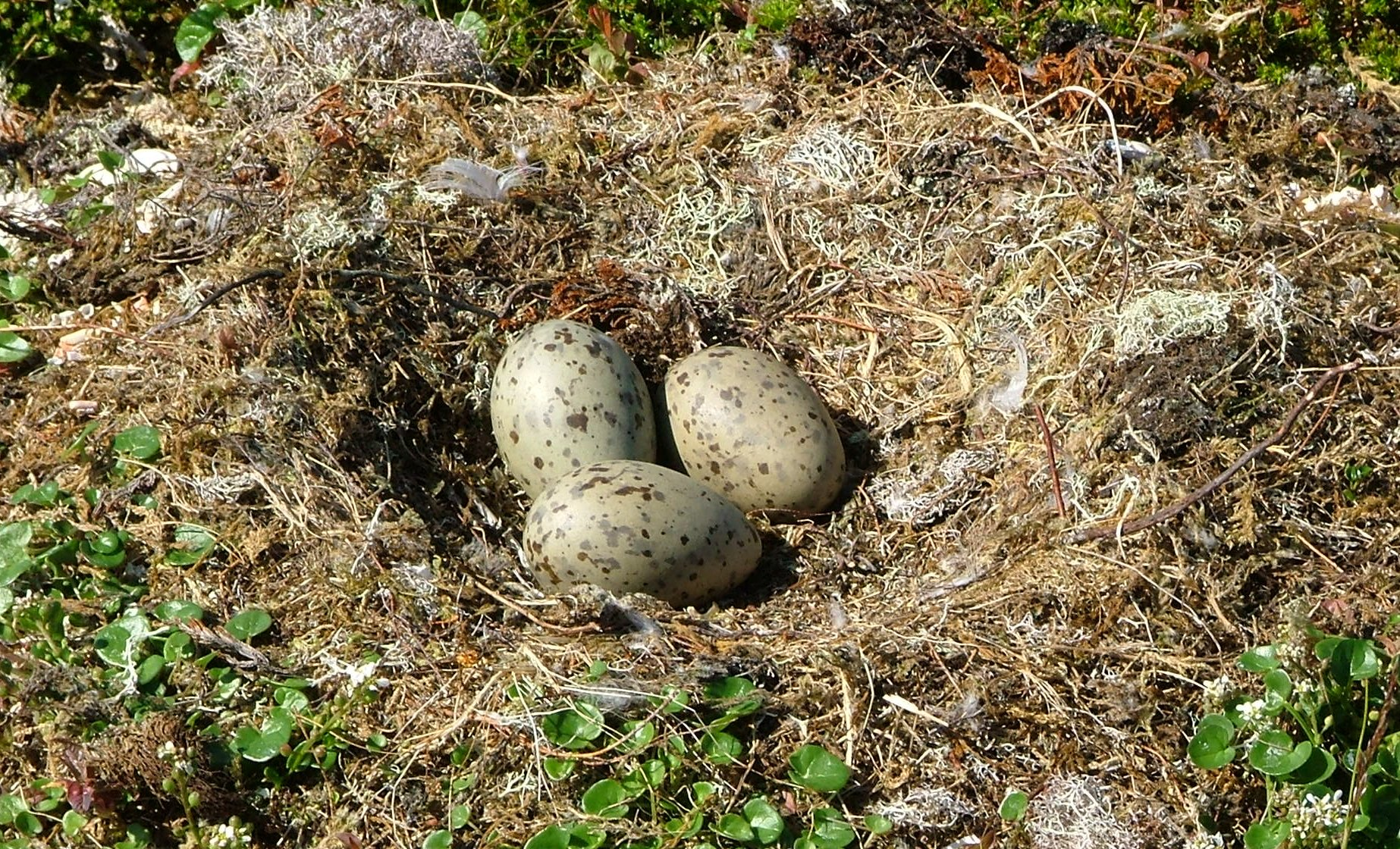
Great black-backed gull nest and eggs

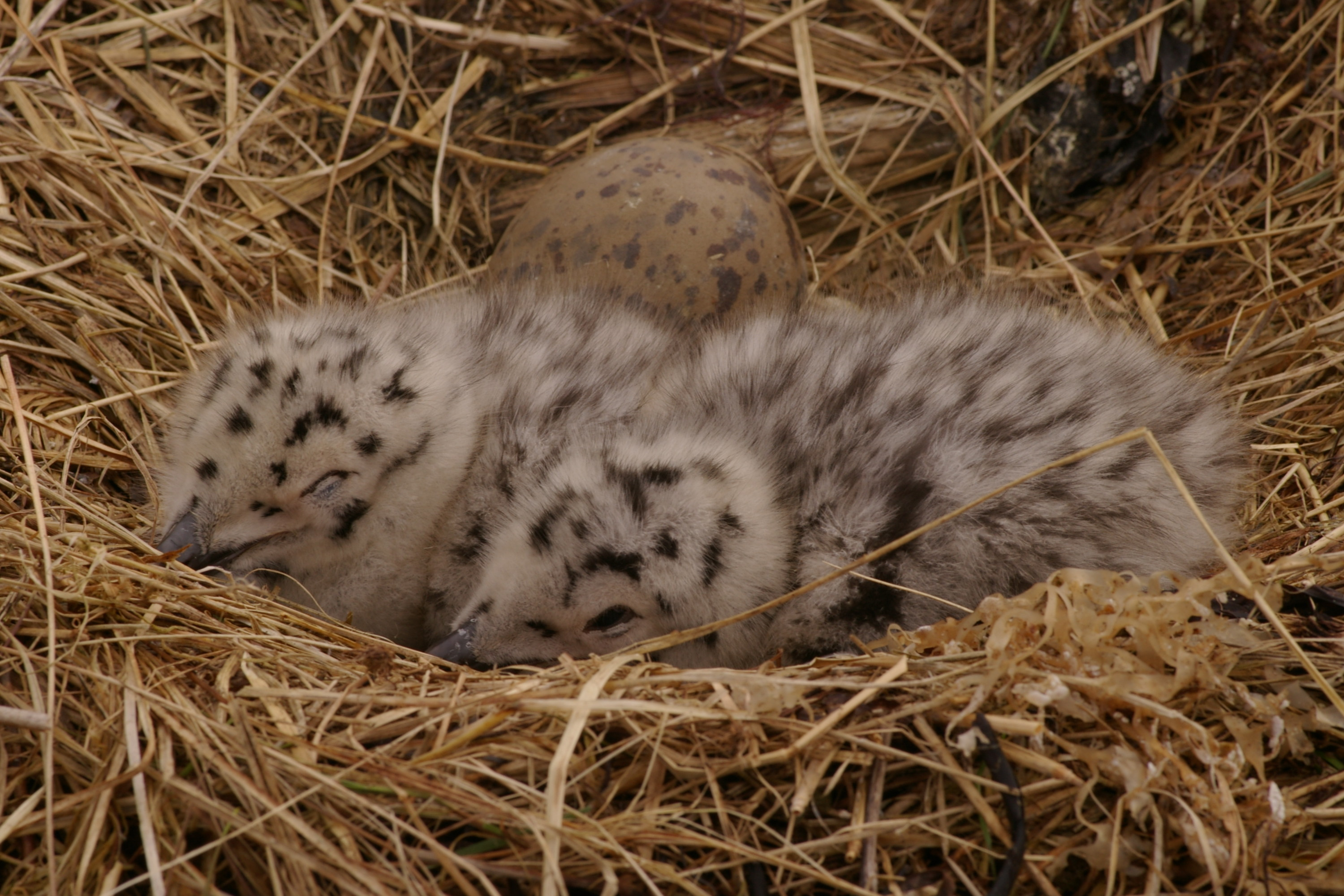
Chicks

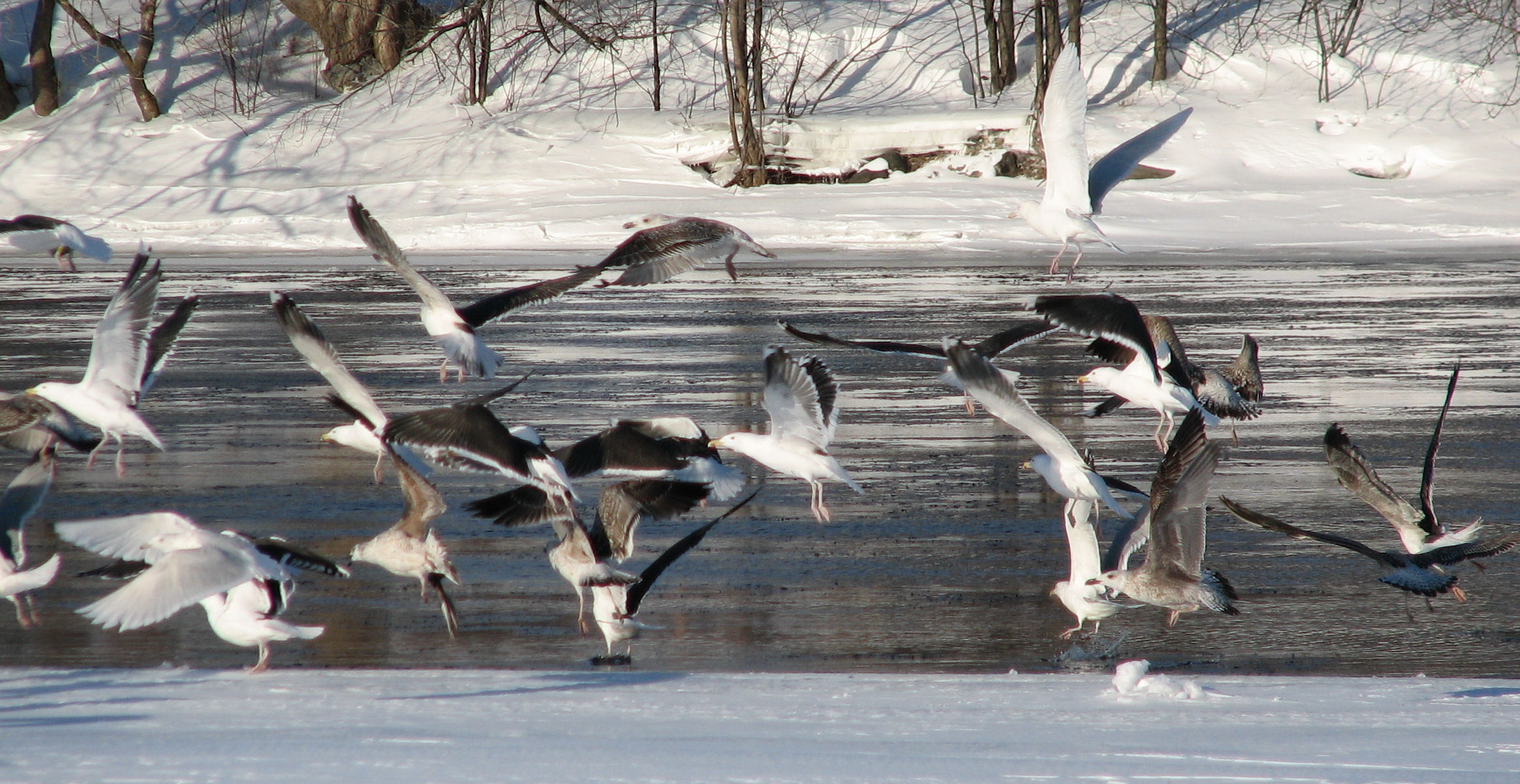
Flock taking off during southern migration through Ottawa, Ontario

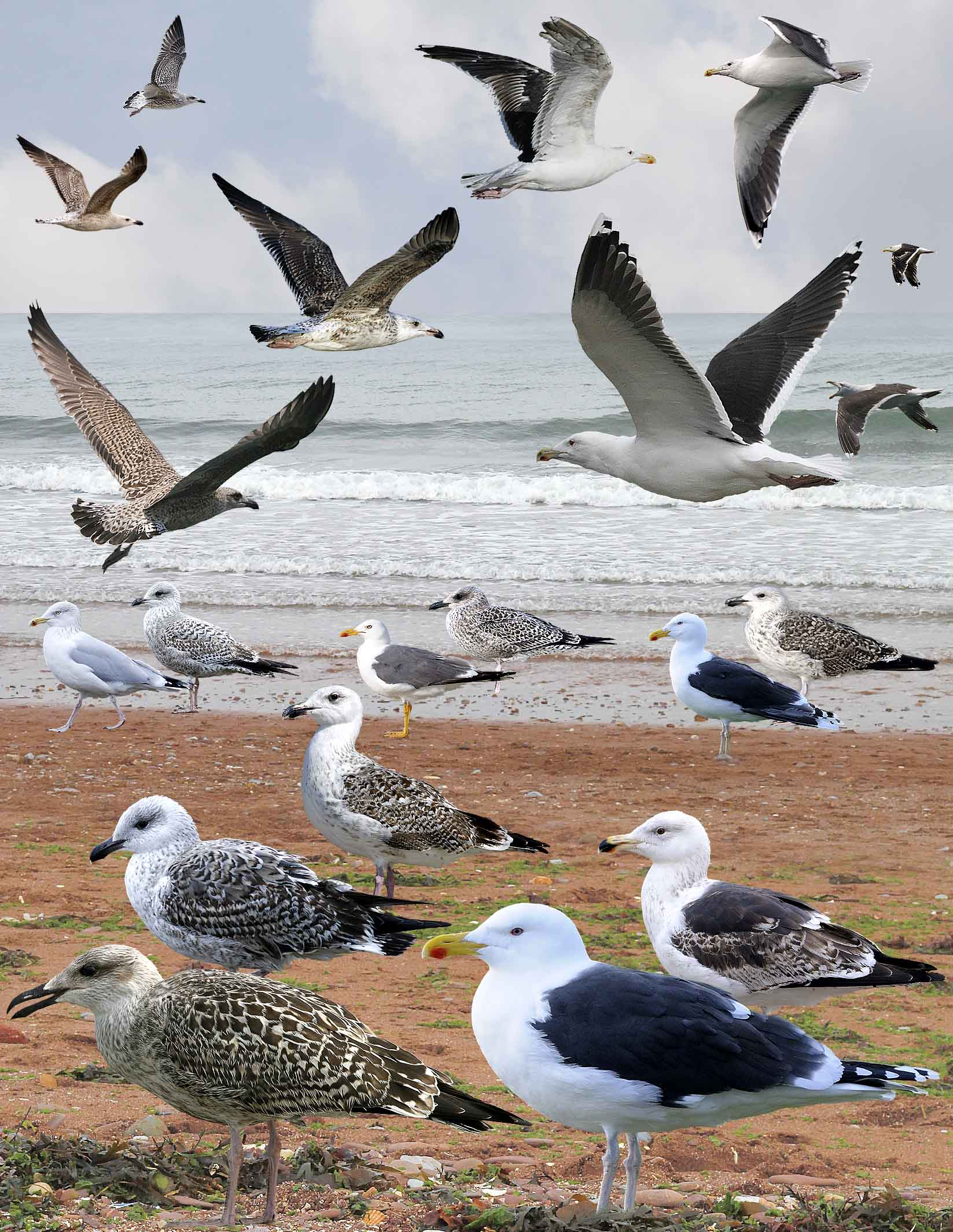
ID composite

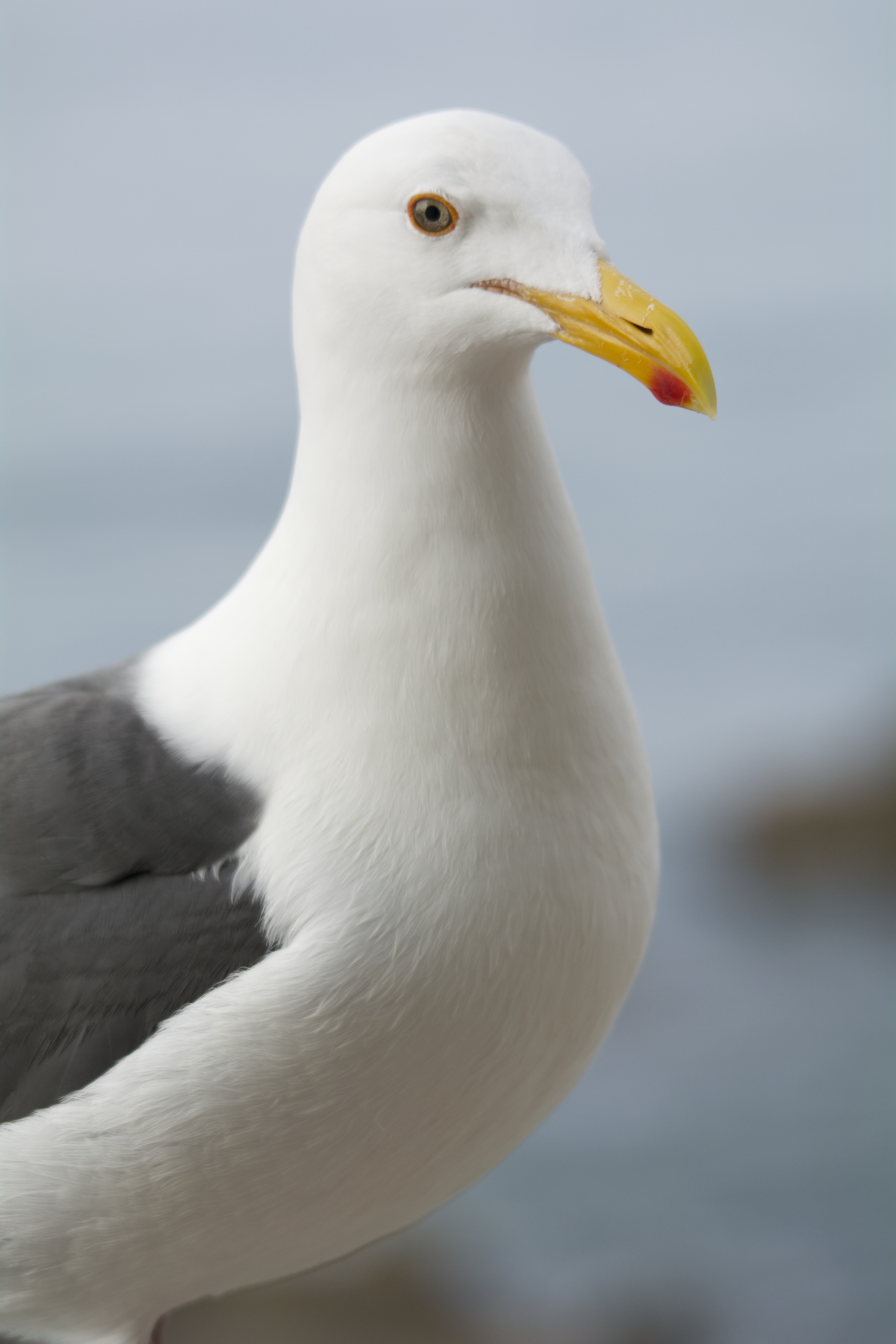

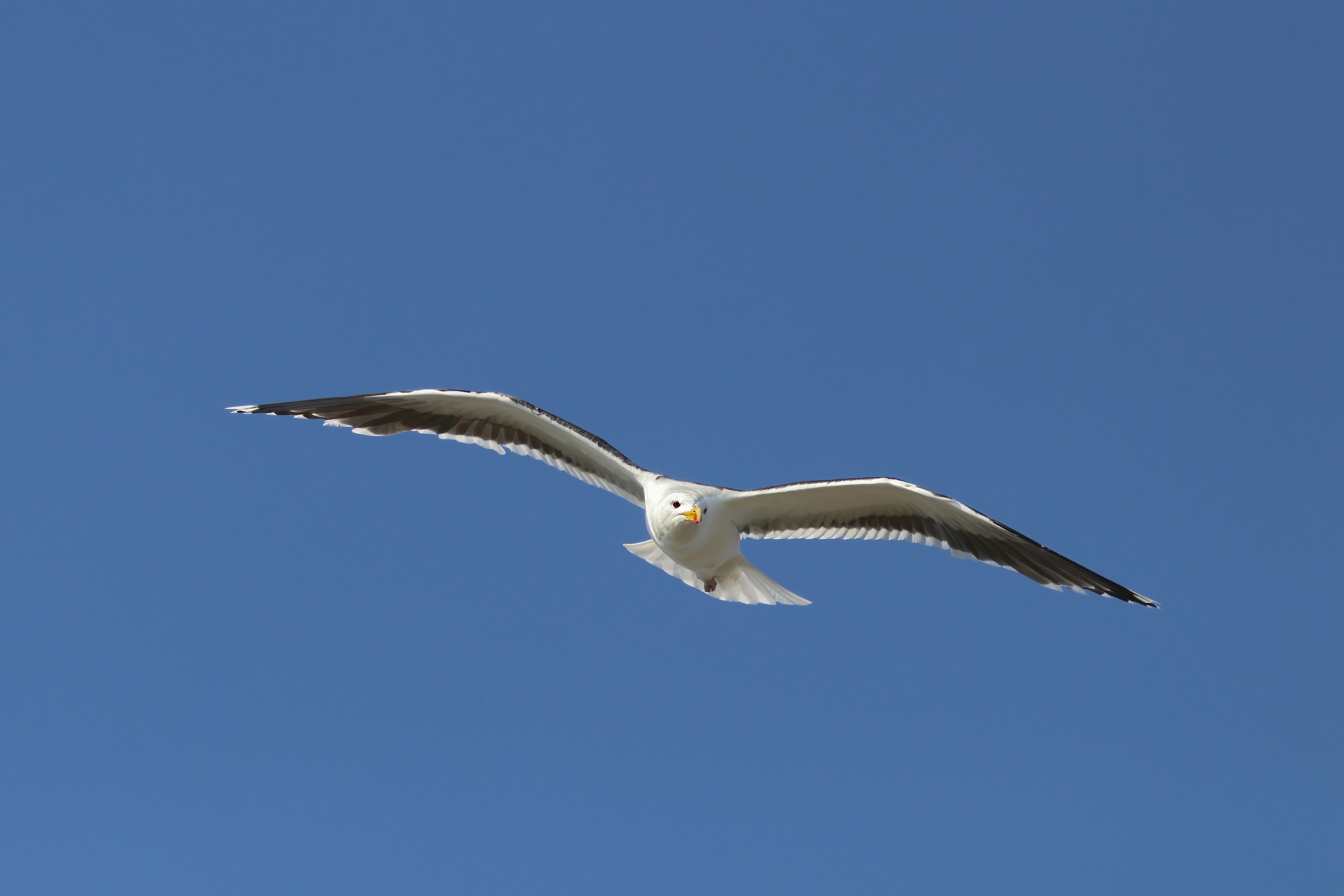

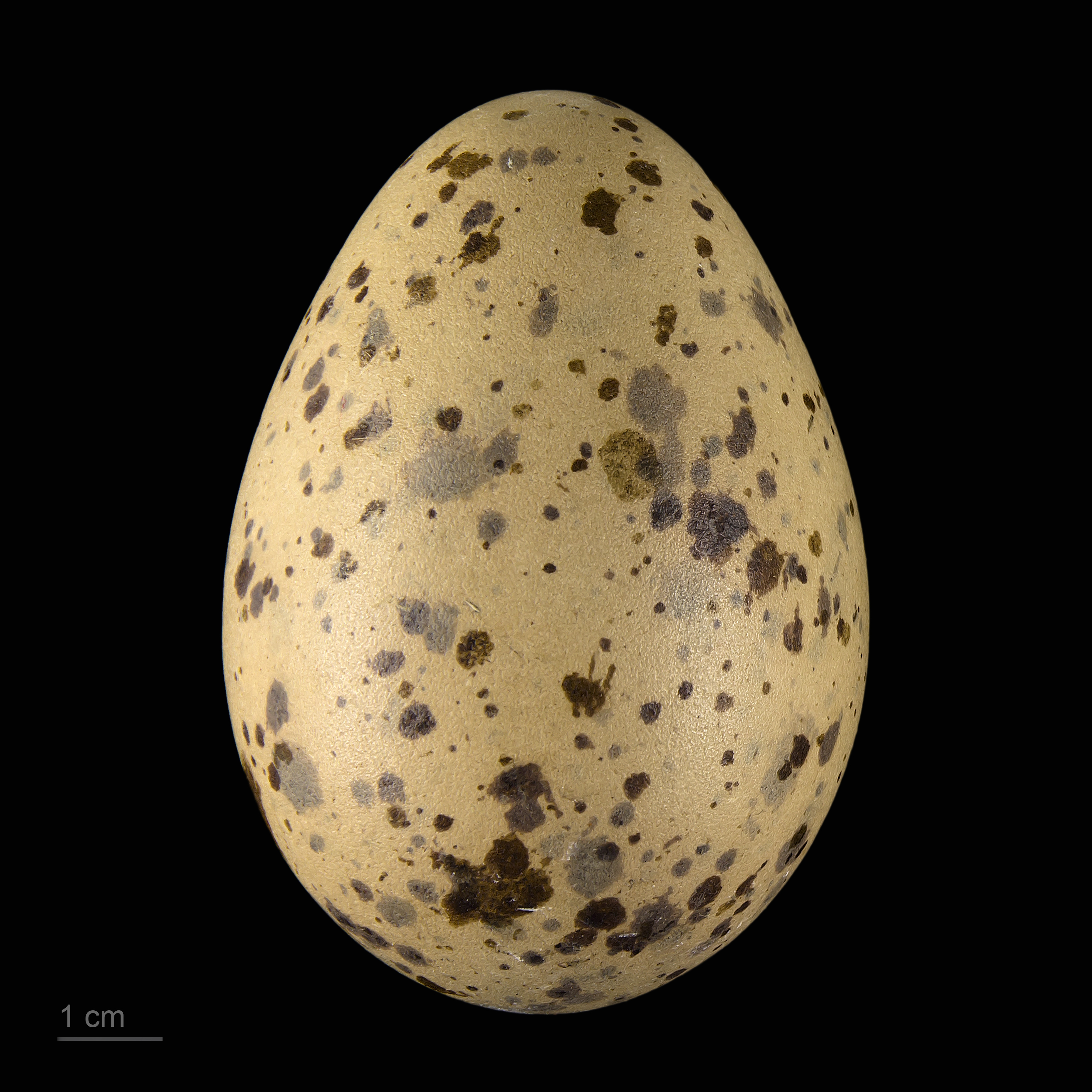
Larus marinus - MHNT

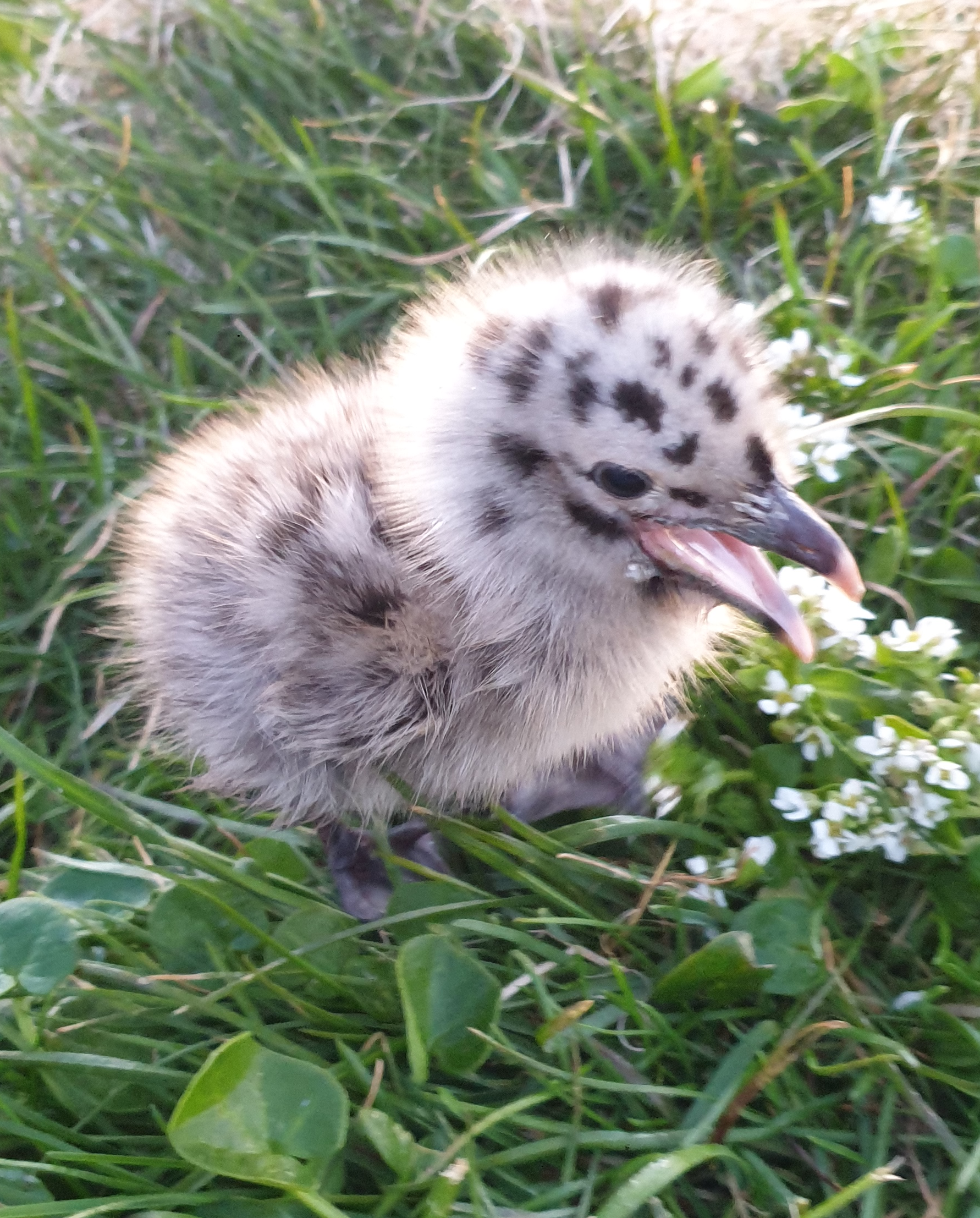
Great black-backed gull chick

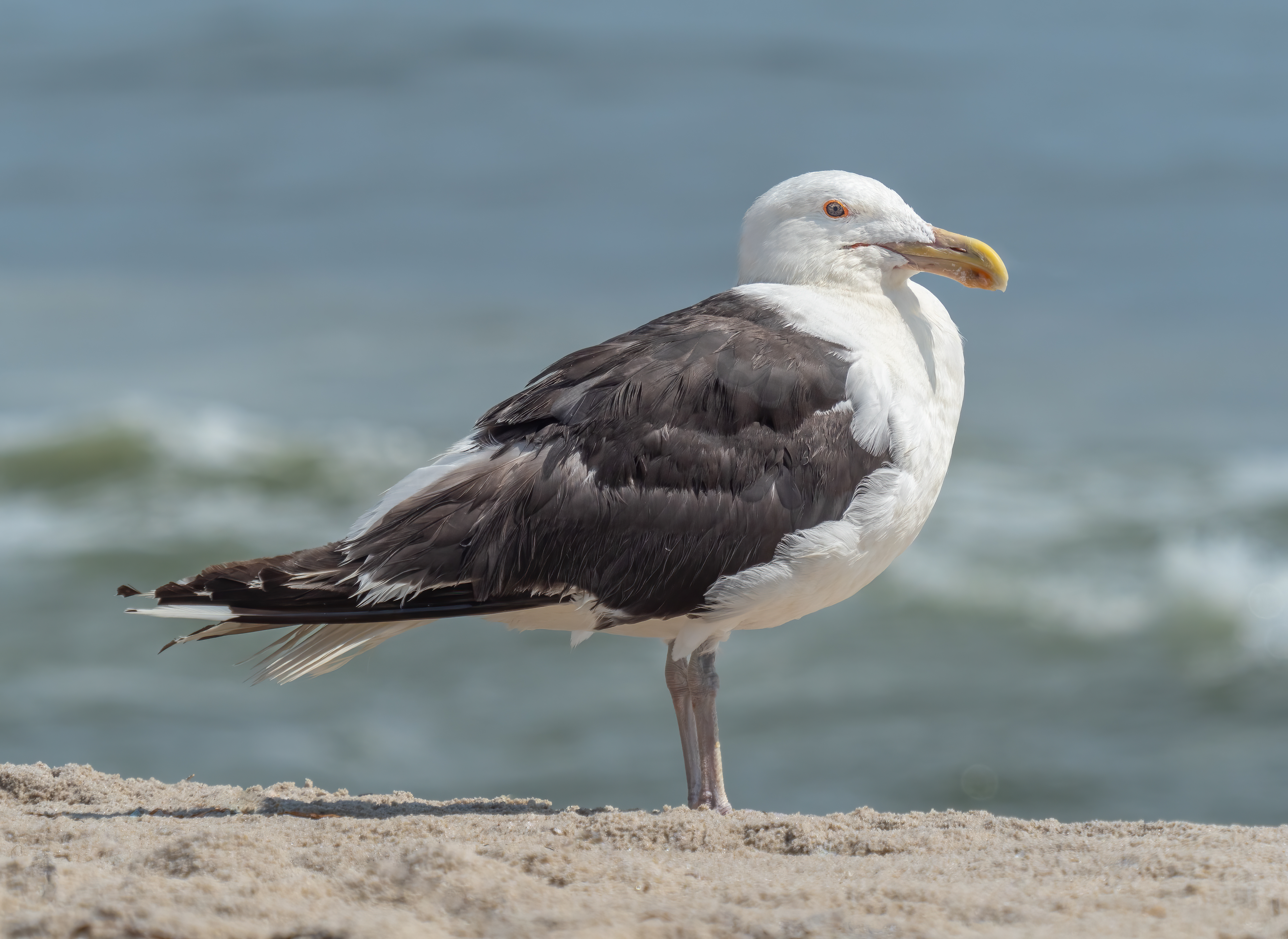
Adult in New York
