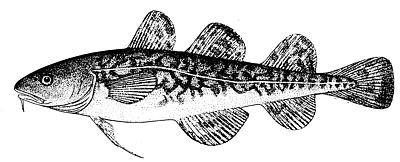

Conservation status
- Least Concern (IUCN 3.1)

Scientific classification
- Kingdom: Animalia
- Phylum: Chordata
- Class: Actinopterygii
- Order: Gadiformes
- Family: Gadidae
- Genus: Microgadus
- Species: M. tomcod

Binomial name
- Microgadus tomcod (Walbaum, 1792)

Synonyms
- Gadus proximus Girard, 1854; Morrhua californica Ayres, 1854; Gadus californicus (Ayres, 1854)

= Microgadus tomcod =

Species of fish

Microgadus tomcod, also commonly known as frostfish, Atlantic tomcod or winter cod, is a type of cod found in North American coastal waters from the Gulf of St. Lawrence, Estuary of St. Lawrence River and northern Newfoundland, south to Virginia.

== Taxonomy ==
The Atlantic tomcod is one of two species in the Microgadus genus, the other being Microgadus proximus, the Pacific tomcod.

== Tomcod fishing ==
In 1757, Count Louis-Antoine de Bougainville (1729-1811) noted that the French settlers of New France practiced angling under the ice to capture the Microgadus tomcod which swims upstream to spawn in the streams flowing into Lake Saint-Pierre and its tributaries, near Trois-Rivières.

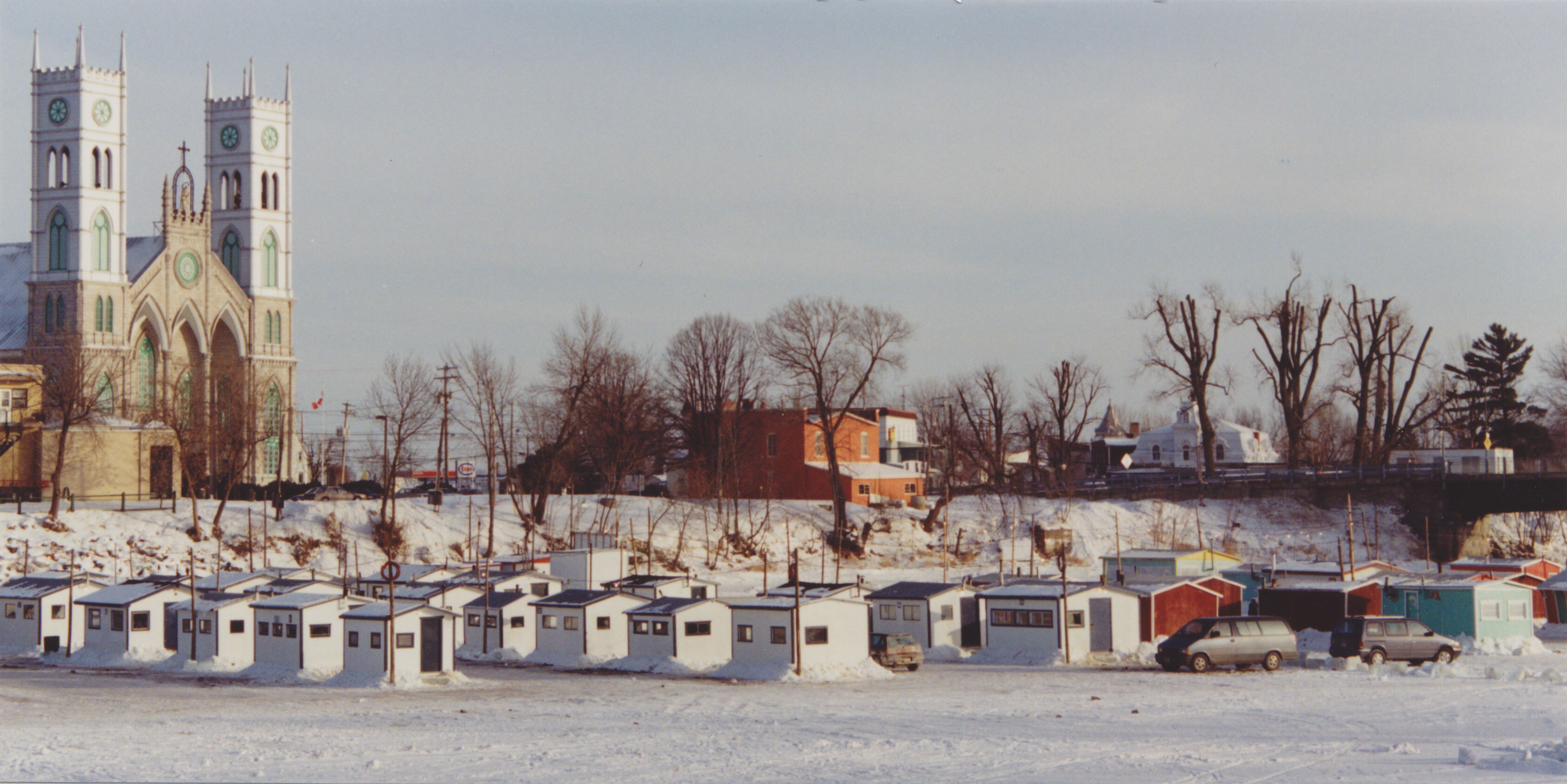
Ice fishing village on the Sainte-Anne River

The fishing season of the tomcod varies by location—one known example is the Sainte-Anne River in Quebec.

A winter visitor, the Microgadus tomcod spawns between mid-December and the end of January mainly up to the Sainte-Anne and Batiscan rivers, in the Estuary of St. Lawrence River.

== Science ==
A biomonitoring program tracked hormone levels of Atlantic tomcod caught near Miramichi and Kouchibouguac in 1993 and 1994, demonstrating that the preparatory period for spawning began in September with maximal steroid levels in November, and spawning took place from late December to January. The town of Sainte-Anne-de-la-Pérade is notable for its fishing village built on the frozen waters of the Ste-Anne, playing host to the scores of fishermen visiting the town to fish for the species.

After General Electric dumped polychlorinated biphenyls (PCBs) in the Hudson River from 1947 through 1976, tomcod living in the river were found to have developed an increased resistance to the compound's toxic effects. Scientists identified the genetic mutation that conferred the resistance, and found that the mutated form was present in 99 percent of the tomcods in the river, compared to fewer than 10 percent of the tomcods from other waters.

This species can reach a length of 38.1 cm (15.0 in).

== Gallery ==
Microgadus tomcod

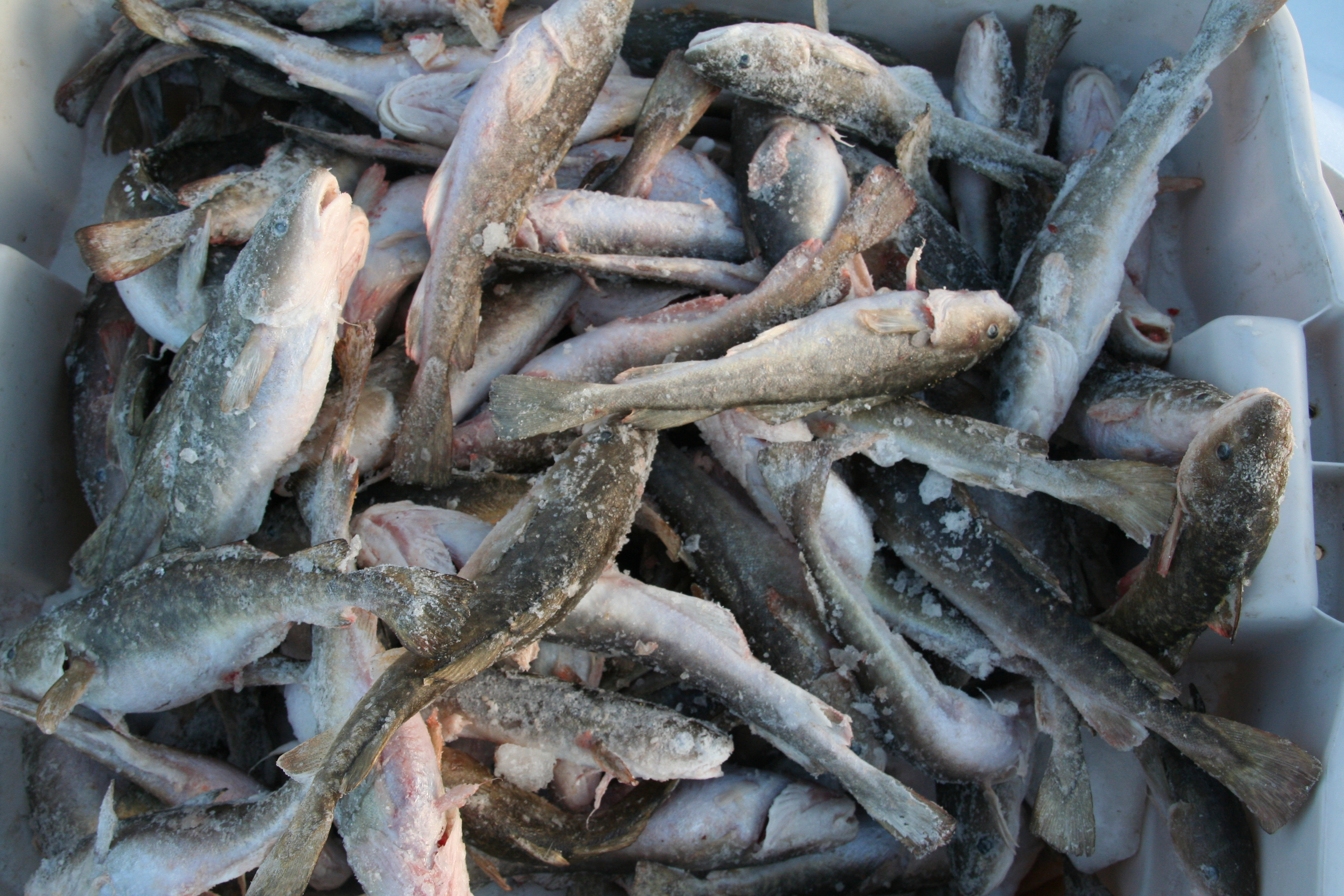
Frozen on the ice of the Sainte-Anne River, at the door of a fishing hut

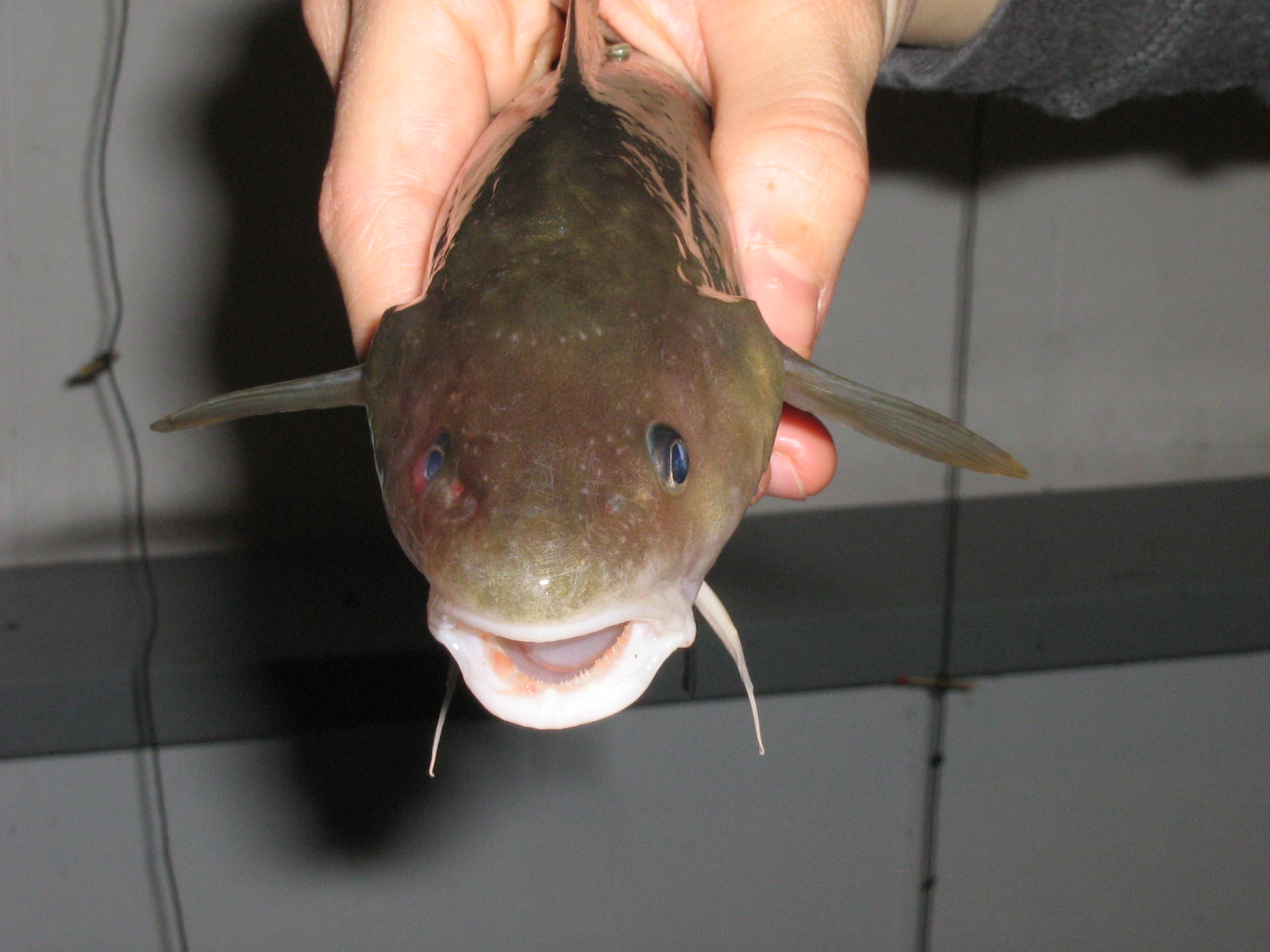

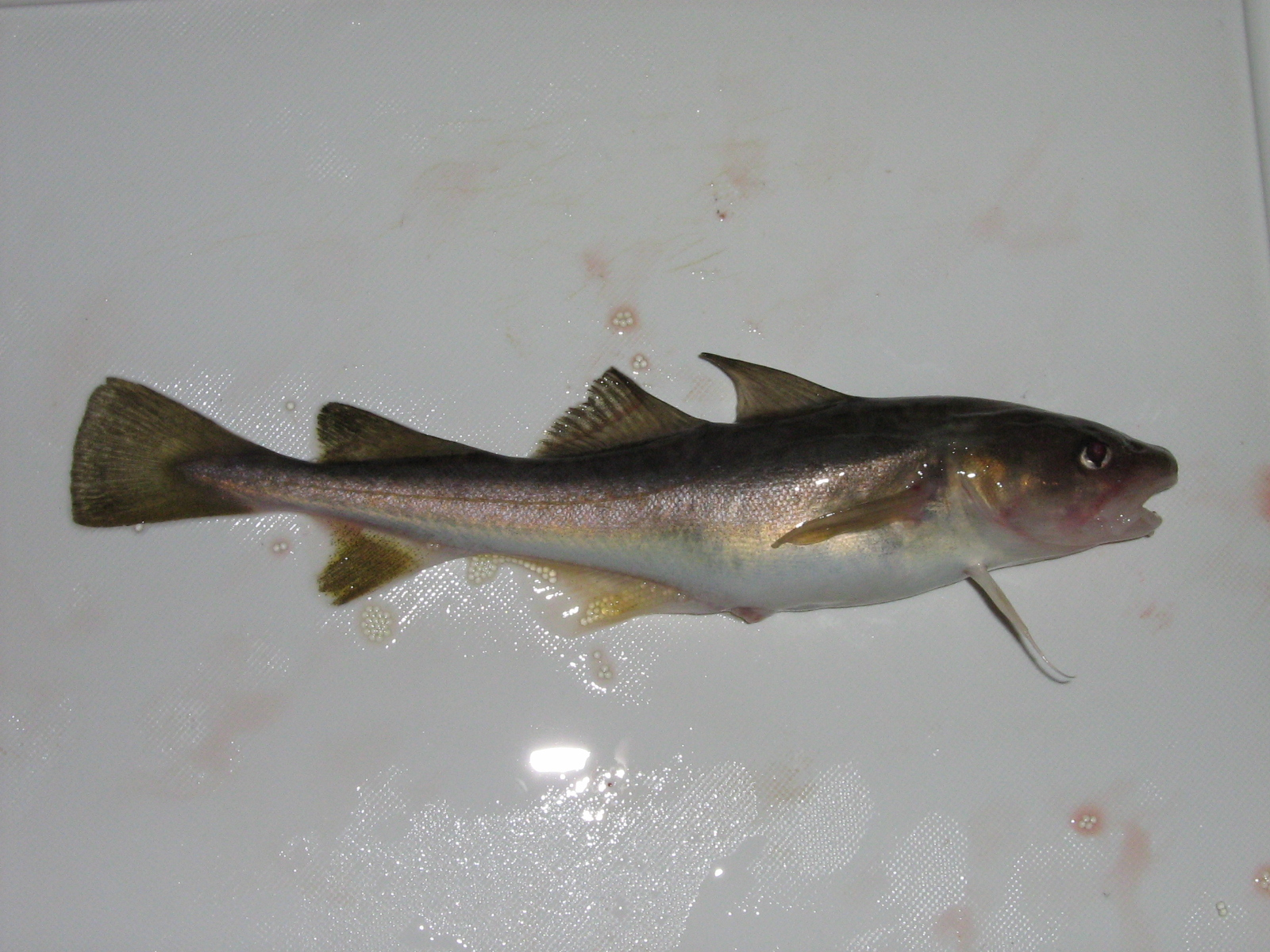
