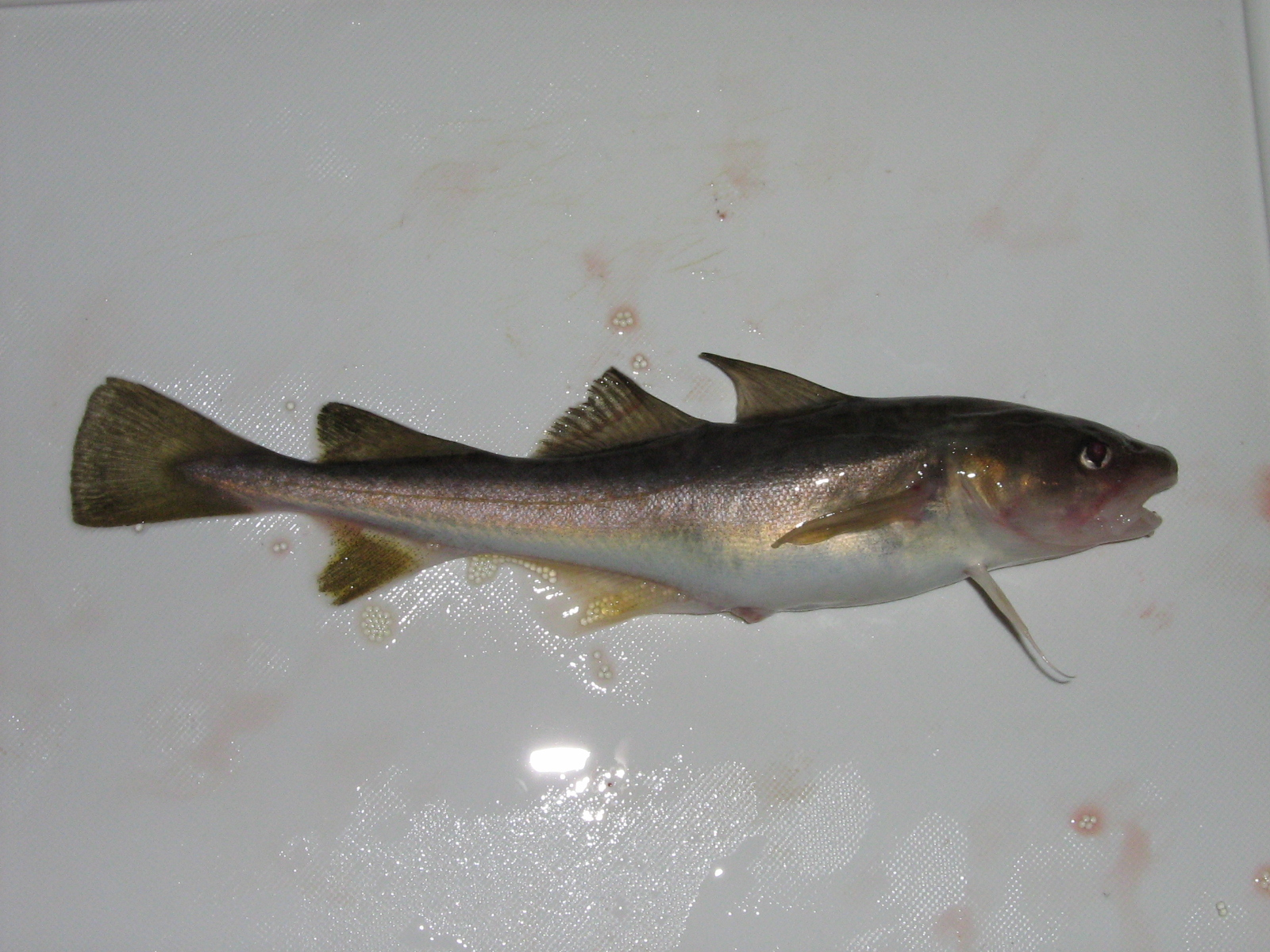
- Atlantic tomcod (M. tomcod)

Scientific classification
- Kingdom: Animalia
- Phylum: Chordata
- Class: Actinopterygii
- Order: Gadiformes
- Family: Gadidae
- Genus: Microgadus; T. N. Gill, 1865

Type species
- Gadus proximus Girard 1854

= Microgadus =

Genus of fishes

Microgadus, the tomcods, is a genus of cods.

== Species ==
There are currently two recognized species in this genus:

- Microgadus proximus (Girard, 1854) (Pacific tomcod)
- Microgadus tomcod (Walbaum, 1792) (Atlantic tomcod)
