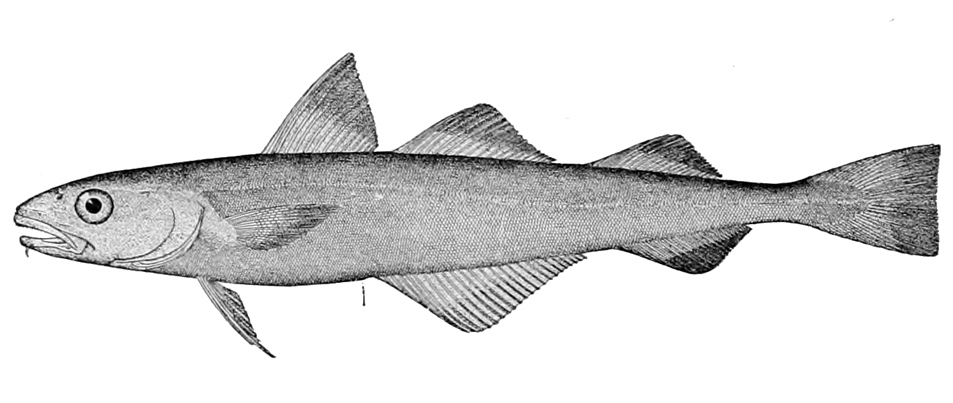

Scientific classification
- Kingdom: Animalia
- Phylum: Chordata
- Class: Actinopterygii
- Order: Gadiformes
- Family: Gadidae
- Genus: Microgadus
- Species: M. proximus

Binomial name
- Microgadus proximus (Girard, 1854)

Synonyms
- Gadus proximus Girard, 1854; Morrhua californica Ayres, 1854; Gadus californicus (Ayres, 1854)

= Microgadus proximus =

Species of fish

Microgadus proximus, also commonly known as Pacific tomcod, is a type of cod fish found in North American coastal waters from the southeastern Bering Sea to central California. This species can reach a length of 30.5 cm (12.0 in).

The diet of the Pacific tomcod includes anchovies, shrimp, worms, and other small marine invertebrates.

Pacific tomcod are occasionally taken by recreational anglers. This is usually incidental to fishing for other species of fish, as they are relatively small in size.
