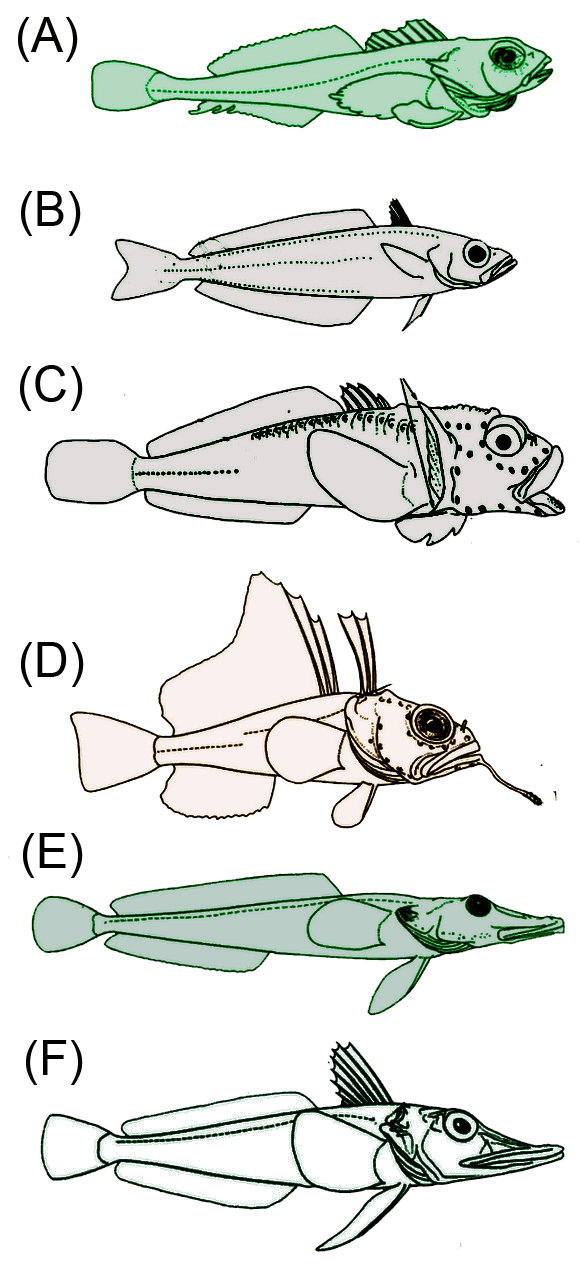
- Six Notothenioidei, illustrations based on "Antarctic Fish and Fisheries" (K.-H. Kock, 1992)

Scientific classification
- Kingdom: Animalia
- Phylum: Chordata
- Class: Actinopterygii
- Division: Teleostei
- Order: Perciformes
- Suborder: Notothenioidei; Regan, 1913

Families
- see text

= Notothenioidei =

Notothenioidei Temporal range: Eocene–present

Suborder of fishes

Notothenioidei is one of 19 suborders of the order Perciformes. The group is found mainly in Antarctic and Subantarctic waters, with some species ranging north to southern Australia and southern South America. Notothenioids constitute approximately 90% of the fish biomass in the continental shelf waters surrounding Antarctica.

== Evolution and geographic distribution ==
The Southern Ocean has supported fish habitats for 400 million years; however, modern notothenioids likely appeared sometime after the Eocene epoch. This period marked the cooling of the Southern Ocean, resulting in the stable, frigid conditions that have persisted to the present day. Another key factor in the evolution of notothenioids is the preponderance of the Antarctic Circumpolar Current (ACC), a large, slow-moving current that extends to the seafloor and precludes most migration to and from the Antarctic region. The earliest known notothenioids are the fossils Proeleginops and Mesetaichthys from the Eocene La Meseta Formation of Seymour Island, the latter of which already shows close similarities with the extant Dissostichus.

These unique environmental conditions in concert with the key evolutionary innovation of antifreeze glycoprotein promoted widespread radiation within the suborder, leading to the rapid development of new species. Their adaptive radiation is characterized by depth related diversification. Comparison studies between non-Antarctic and Antarctic species have revealed different ecological processes and genetic differences between the two groups of fish, such as the loss of hemoglobin (in the family Channichthyidae) and changes in buoyancy.

They are distributed mainly throughout the Southern Ocean around the coasts of New Zealand, southern South America, and Antarctica. An estimated 79% of species reside within the Antarctic region. They primarily inhabit seawater temperatures between −2 and 4 °C (28 and 39 °F); however, some of the non-Antarctic species inhabit waters that may be as warm as 10 °C (50 °F) around New Zealand and South America. Seawater temperatures below the freezing point of freshwater (0 °C or 32 °F) are possible due to the greater salinity in the Southern Ocean waters. Notothenioids have an estimated depth range of about 0–1,500 m (0–4,921 ft).

== Anatomy ==
Notothenioids display a morphology that is largely typical of other coastal perciform fishes. They are not distinguished by a single physical trait, but rather a distinctive set of morphological traits. These include the presence of three flat pectoral fin radials, nostrils located laterally on each side of the head, the lack of a swim bladder, and the presence of multiple lateral lines.

Because notothenioids lack a swim bladder, the majority of species are benthic or demersal in nature. However, a depth-related diversification has given rise to some species attaining increased buoyancy, using lipid deposits in tissues and reduced ossification of bony structures. This reduced ossification of the skeleton (observed in some notothenioids) changes the weight and creates neutral buoyancy in the water, where the fish neither sinks nor floats, and can thus adjust its depth with ease.

== Physiology ==
Notothenioids have a variety of physiological and biochemical adaptations that either permit survival in, or are possible only because of, the generally cold, stable seawater temperatures of the Southern Ocean. These include highly unsaturated membrane lipids and metabolic compensation in enzymatic activity. Many notothenoids have lost the nearly universal heat shock response (HSR) due to evolution at cold and stable temperatures.

Many notothenioid fishes are able to survive in the freezing, ice-laden waters of the Southern Ocean because of the presence of an antifreeze glycoprotein in blood and body fluids. Although many of the Antarctic species have antifreeze proteins in their body fluids, not all of them do. Some non-Antarctic species either produce no or very little antifreeze, and antifreeze concentrations in some species are very low in young, larval fish. They also possess aglomerular kidneys, an adaptation that aids the retention of these antifreeze proteins.

While the majority of animal species have up to 45% of hemoglobin (or other oxygen-binding and oxygen-transporting pigments) in their blood, the notothenioids of the family Channichthyidae do not express any globin proteins in their blood. As a result, the oxygen-carrying capacity of their blood is reduced to less than 10% that of other fishes. This trait likely arose due to the high oxygen solubility of the Southern Ocean waters. At cold temperatures, the oxygen solubility of water is enhanced. The loss of hemoglobin is partially compensated in these species by the presence of a large, slow-beating heart and enlarged blood vessels that transport a large volume of blood under low pressure to enhance cardiac output. Despite these compensations, the loss of globin proteins still results in reduced physiological performance.

== Systematics ==
=== Naming ===
Notothenioidei was first described as a separate grouping, as a "division" he named Nototheniiformes, by the British ichthyologist Charles Tate Regan in 1913., this subsequently has been considered as a suborder of the Percifomes. The name is based on the genus Notothenia, a name coined by Sir John Richardson in 1841 and which means "coming from the south", a reference to the Antarctic distribution of the genus.

=== Families ===
This classification follows Eschmeyer's Catalog of Fishes (2025) and includes references to additional classified species. Most species are restricted to the vicinity of Antarctica, with a smaller number off the coast of southern South America, Australia & New Zealand.

- Suborder Notothenioidei
  - Genus †Mesetaichthys Bieńkowska-Wasiluk, Bonde, Møller & Gaździcki, 2013 (mid-late Eocene of Seymour Island)
  - Genus †Proeleginops Balushkin, 1994 (early Eocene of Seymour Island)
  - Family Percophidae Swainson, 1839
    - Genus Percophis Quoy & Gaimard, 1825
  - Family Bovichtidae Gill, 1862
    - Genus Bovichtus Valenciennes, 1832
    - Genus Cottoperca Steindachner, 1875
    - Genus Halaphritis Last, Balushkin & Hutchins, 2002
  - Family Pseudaphritidae McCulloch, 1929
    - Genus Pseudaphritis Castelnau, 1872
  - Family Eleginopidae Gill, 1893
    - Genus Eleginops Gill, 1862
  - Family Nototheniidae Günther, 1861
    - Subfamily Pleuragrammatinae Andersen & Hureau, 1979
      - Genus Aethotaxis H. H. DeWitt, 1962
      - Genus Dissostichus Smitt, 1898
      - Genus Gvozdarus Balushkin, 1989
      - Genus Pleuragramma Balushkin, 1982
    - Subfamily Nototheniinae Günther, 1861
      - Genus Gobionotothen Balushkin, 1976
      - Genus Indonotothenia Balushkin, 1984
      - Genus Lepidonotothen Balushkin, 1976
      - Genus Notothenia Richardson, 1844
      - Genus Nototheniops Balushkin, 1976 (=Lindbergichthys Balushkin, 1979)
      - Genus Paranotothenia Balushkin, 1976
      - Genus Patagonotothen Balushkin, 1976
    - Subfamily Trematominae Balushkin, 1982
      - Genus Cryothenia Daniels, 1981
      - Genus Pagothenia Nichols & La Monte, 1936
      - Genus Pseudotrematomus Balushkin, 1982
      - Genus Trematomus Boulenger, 1902
  - Family Harpagiferidae Gill, 1861
    - Subfamily Harpagiferinae Gill, 1861
      - Genus Harpagifer Richardson, 1844
    - Subfamily Artedidraconinae Andriashev, 1967
      - Genus Artedidraco Lönnberg, 1905
      - Genus Dolloidraco Roule, 1913
      - Genus Histiodraco Regan, 1914
      - Genus Pogonophryne Regan, 1914
  - Family Bathydraconidae Regan, 1913
    - Subfamily Bathydraconinae Regan, 1913
      - Genus Akarotaxis DeWitt & Hureau, 1980
      - Genus Bathydraco Günther, 1878
      - Genus Prionodraco Regan, 1914 (one species)
      - Genus Racovitzia Dollo, 1900
      - Genus Vomeridens DeWitt & Hureau, 1980
    - Subfamily Gymnodraconinae Andriashev, 1983
      - Genus Acanthodraco Skóra, 1995
      - Genus Gymnodraco Boulenger, 1902
      - Genus Psilodraco Norman. 1937
    - Subfamily "Cygnodraconinae" (undescribed)
      - Genus Cygnodraco Waite, 1916
      - Genus Gerlachea Dollo, 1900
      - Genus Parachaenichthys Boulenger, 1902
  - Family Channichthyidae Gill, 1861
    - Genus Chaenocephalus Richardson, 1844
    - Genus Chaenodraco Regan, 1914
    - Genus Champsocephalus Gill, 1861 (two species)
    - Genus Channichthys Richardson, 1844
    - Genus Chionobathyscus Andriashev & Neyelov, 1978
    - Genus Chionodraco Lönnberg, 1905
    - Genus Cryodraco Dollo, 1900
    - Genus Dacodraco Waite, 1916
    - Genus Neopagetopsis Nybelin, 1947
    - Genus Pagetopsis Regan, 1913
    - Genus Pseudochaenichthys Norman, 1937
