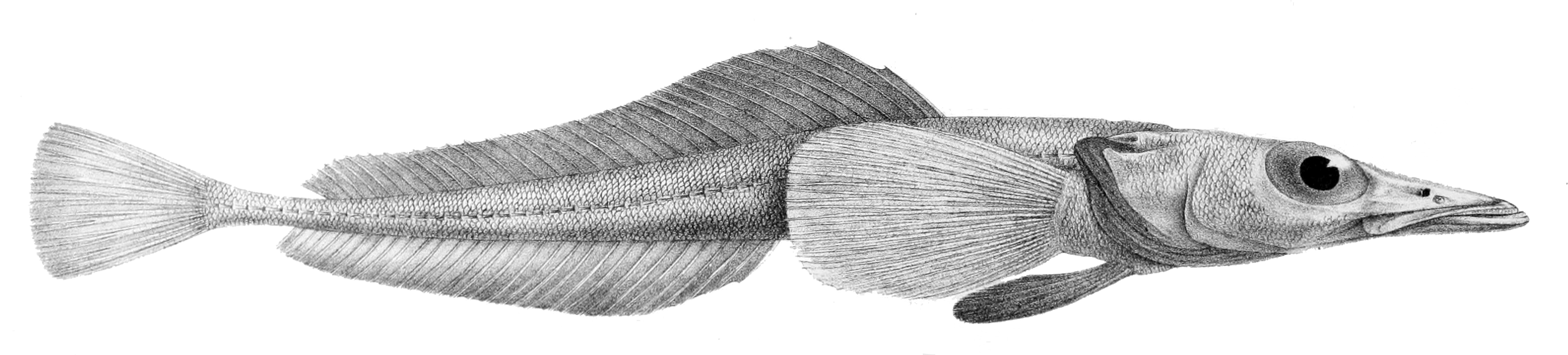
- B. antarcticus
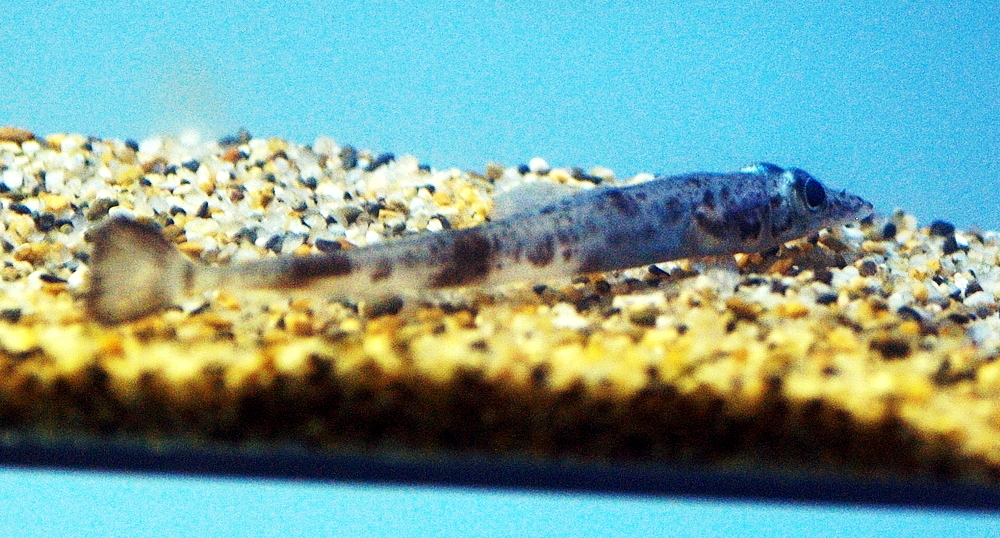
- Deep-water Dragon (B. marri)

Scientific classification
- Kingdom: Animalia
- Phylum: Chordata
- Class: Actinopterygii
- Order: Perciformes
- Family: Bathydraconidae
- Genus: Bathydraco; Günther, 1878

Type species
- Bathydraco antarcticus Günther 1878

= Bathydraco =

Genus of fishes

Bathydraco is a genus of marine ray-finned fishes belonging to the family Bathydraconidae, the Antarctic dragonfishes. They are native to the Southern Ocean.

== Taxonomy ==
Bathydraco was first described as a genus in 1878 by the German-born British ichthyologist Albert Günther as a monotypic genus with B. antarctica, which had been collected on the Challenger expedition south of Heard Island, as its type species. The generic name Bathydraco is a combination of bathy meaning "deep" and draco meaning dragon, the type of B. antarctica was collected at 2,304 m (7,559 ft) and draco is a commonly used suffix for Notothenioids.

== Species ==
There are currently five recognized species in this genus:

- Bathydraco antarcticus Günther, 1878
- Bathydraco joannae H. H. DeWitt, 1985
- Bathydraco macrolepis Boulenger, 1907
- Bathydraco marri Norman, 1938 (Deep-water dragon)
- Bathydraco scotiae Dollo, 1906
