= Akarotaxis gouldae =

Scientific classification
- Kingdom: Animalia
- Phylum: Chordata
- Class: Actinopterygii
- Order: Perciformes
- Family: Bathydraconidae
- Genus: Akarotaxis
- Species: A. gouldae

Binomial name
- Akarotaxis gouldae Corso et al., 2024

Species of fish

Akarotaxis gouldae, also known as the banded dragonfish, is a species of ray-finned fish discovered in August 2024 in the Southern Ocean along the continental shelf of Antarctica. Adult specimens measure on average 13 cm (5.1 in) long.

The species is characterised by having two dark vertical bands of colour on the sides of the body. They also have a slender body with an elongated mouth and oval-shaped eyes
