= Paranotothenia dewitti =

Scientific classification
- Kingdom: Animalia
- Phylum: Chordata
- Class: Actinopterygii
- Order: Perciformes
- Family: Nototheniidae
- Genus: Paranotothenia
- Species: P. dewitti

Binomial name
- Paranotothenia dewitti Balushkin, 1990

Species of fish

Paranotothenia dewitti is a species of marine ray-finned fish, belonging to the family Nototheniidae, the notothens or cod icefishes. It is native to the Southern Ocean where it is found in the area of sea which the Russians refer to as the Somov Sea. This species was first formally described in 1990 by the Russian ichthyologist Arkadii Vladimirovich Balushkin with the type locality given as the Somov Sea at 64°04'S, 165°39'E.

== Etymology ==
Balushkin did not identify who he honoured in the specific name but it is almost certainly the American ichthyologist Hugh Hamilton DeWitt.
