= Acanthodraco =

Scientific classification
- Kingdom: Animalia
- Phylum: Chordata
- Class: Actinopterygii
- Order: Perciformes
- Family: Bathydraconidae
- Genus: Acanthodraco; Skóra (pl), 1995
- Species: A. dewitti

Binomial name
- Acanthodraco dewitti Skóra, 1995

Species of fish

Acanthodraco is a monotypic genus of marine ray-finned fish belonging to the family Bathydraconidae, the Antarctic dragonfishes, its only species is DeWitt's dragonfish (Acanthodraco dewitti). They are found in the Southern Ocean and the southeastern Pacific Ocean.

Acanthodraco was first formally described as a genus by the Polish ichthyologist Krzysztof Edward Skóra in 1995 when he was describing its only species Acanthodraco dewitti. The type locality of A. dewitti is the South Shetland Islands. The genus name is a compound of acanthus, which means "thorn" or "spine" alluding to the higher number spines on the operculum than related genera, and draco Meaning "dragon", a common suffix in the scientific names of notothenioid fishes. The specific name honours the American ichthyologist Hugh Hamilton DeWitt, a renowned worker on notothenioid fishes.

Acanthodraco is a bathydemersal fish found at depths of at least 255 m (837 ft) and since the original description has been found in the Ross Sea and in the southeastern Pacific Ocean off Chile. A. dewitti probably has a Circumpolar distribution around the Antarctic and is replaced in the seas around South Georgia by the similar Psilodraco breviceps. Two specimens from the Ross Sea had standard lengths of 125 mm (4.9 in) and 128 mm (5.0 in) respectively. They had 27 rays in the dorsal fin and 25-26 rays in the anal fin. These specimens were of either sex and their gonads were developing towards spawning. This alongside the presence of postlarvae in Terra Nova Bay suggest this species spawns in the Ross Sea.
