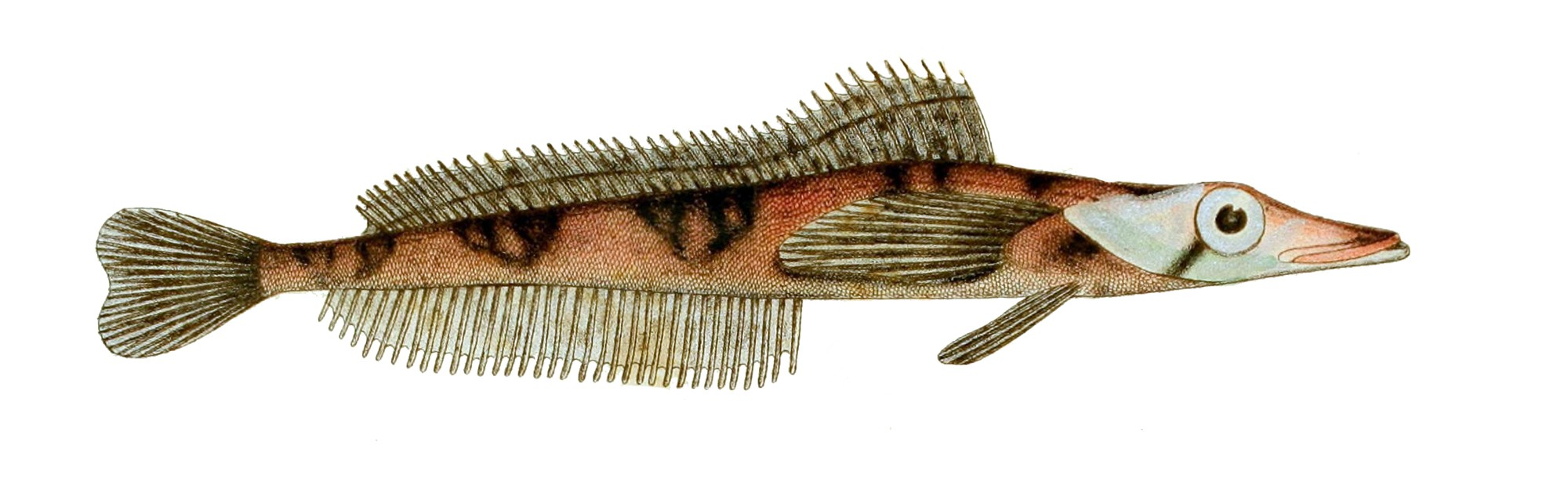

Scientific classification
- Kingdom: Animalia
- Phylum: Chordata
- Class: Actinopterygii
- Order: Perciformes
- Family: Bathydraconidae
- Genus: Gerlachea; Dollo, 1900
- Species: G. australis

Binomial name
- Gerlachea australis Dollo, 1900

= Gerlachea =

Species of fish

Gerlachea is a monotypic genus of marine ray-finned fish belonging to the family Bathydraconidae, the Antarctic dragonfishes, its only species is Gerlachea australis. It is found at depths of from 200 to 670 metres (660 to 2,200 ft) over the Antarctic continental shelf. This species is the only known member of its genus.

== Taxonomy ==
Gerlachea was first described as a genus in 1900 by the Belgian palaeontologist Louis Dollo when he was describing the only species in this monotypic genus Gerlachea australis, the type of which had been collected by the Belgian Antarctic Expedition at a depth of 500 fathoms at 71°34'S, 89°10'W off Antarctica. The genus name honours the leader of the Belgian Antarctic Expedition, Adrien de Gerlache while the specific name australis means "southern" commemorating that expedition.

== Description ==
Gerlachea australis has its body and cheeks covered in cycloid scales and there are no spines or hooks on the naked operculum. There are bans of small conical teeth in the jaws. The snout is long and flattened and the mouth extends back as far as the rear pore in the interorbital space. There are two lateral lines made up of tubular scales, an upper which is located near the base of the dorsal fin and a lower which is near the base of the anal fin, there is no middle lateral line. The dorsal fin as 44-48 soft rays and the anal fin has 34-36 soft rays. This species grows to a total length of 28 cm (11 in). In alcohol the body is brown with 4-5 darker brown bars which vary in length and width. The operculum and the lower part of the head are light brown, There is a large dark spot at the base of the pectoral fin. The dorsal fin is black at the front bit this narrows to a stripe along the base towards the tail. The anal fin has black tips to its forward rays bit is otherwise light in colour. The caudal and pelvic fins are dark, while the pectoral fin is blackish. There is a dark oblique stripe across the cheek and the tip if the jaws are black.

== Distribution and habitat ==
Grelachea australis is found in the Southern Ocean where it has been recorded at the Antarctic Peninsula, Elephant Island and the Antarctic continental shelf. It is a bathydemersal species found at depths between 200 and 670 m (660 and 2,200 ft).

== Biology ==
Gerlachea australis breed when they attain a length greater than 200 mm (7.9 in) in the Weddell Sea. Spawning takes place in the autumn and early winter with the eggs likely to hatch in the following spring. They have a long larval phase. As adults they are predators of pelagic crustaceans such as Euphausia superba, Hyperiella antarctica and Euphausia crystallorophias, as well as other amphipods.
