= Niphon =

Niphon or Nephon may refer to:

- Japan (Nippon, Nihon) or the main island Honshu
- Saint Niphon of Constantia (4th century), Bishop of Constantia on Cyprus, feast day December 23
- Saint Niphont of Novgorod (died 1156), Bishop of Novgorod, feast day April 8
- Nephon I of Constantinople (died 1328), Ecumenical Patriarch of Constantinople 1310–1314
- Niphon of Alexandria, Greek Patriarch of Alexandria 1366–1385
- Saint Niphon Kausokalybites of Mount Athos (1316–1411), Greek Orthodox monk
- Saint Nephon II of Constantinople (died 1508), Ecumenical Patriarch of Constantinople 1486–1488, 1497–1498, and 1502
- USS Niphon (1863), a steam ship of Union Navy in the American Civil War
- Niphon spinosus, a species of marine ray-finned fish commonly called the ara
