= Racovitzia =

Scientific classification
- Kingdom: Animalia
- Phylum: Chordata
- Class: Actinopterygii
- Order: Perciformes
- Family: Bathydraconidae
- Genus: Racovitzia; Dollo, 1900

Type species
- Racovitzia glacialis Dollo, 1900

Synonyms
- Aconichthys Waite, 1916

Genus of fishes

Racovitzia is a genus of marine ray-finned fish belonging to the family Bathydraconidae, the Antarctic dragonfishes. They are found in the Southern Ocean around Antarctica.

== Taxonomy ==
Racovitzia was formally described as a genus in 1900 by the Belgian palaeontologist Louis Dollo when he was describing the only species in what was then considered to be a monotypic genus, Racovitzia glacialis the type of which had been collected by the Belgian Antarctic Expedition off the Antarctic at 71°23'S, 87°32'W or 71°19'S, 87°37'W. In 1916 Edgar Ravenswood Waite described Aconichthys harrisoni which has since been determined to be the second species in the genus, however some authorities consider that R harrisoni is a junior synonym of R. glacialis. The genus name honours the Romanian biologist Emil Racoviță who was the naturalist aboard the Belgica the ship which carried and supported the Belgian Antarctic Expedition.

== Species ==
There are currently two recognized species in this genus:

- Racovitzia glacialis Dollo, 1900
- Racovitzia harrissoni (Waite, 1916)

== Characteristics ==
Racovitzia has a slender elongated body which is only slightly compressed and has a long spatulate snout. The body is covered with small, ctenoid scales. There are three lateral lines which are made up of tubular scales. There is a strong ridge on the operculum which ends either in a rounded point or a small number of serrations. The jaws have band of small conical teeth. R. glacialis attains a maximum total length of 28.7 cm (11.3 in).

== Distribution habitat and biology ==
Racovitzia are found in the Southern Ocean with R. glacialis having a circum-Antarctic distribution on the continental shelf as well as around the South Sandwich Islands, South Orkney Islands, Elephant Island and South Shetland Islands. R. harrissoni is restricted to the southeastern Pacific Ocean off Chile. They are demersal or bathydemersal, deep water fishes found down to around 600 m (2,000 ft). Their biology is little known but they have been recorded feeding on amphipods and krill, and they are probably largely dependant on krill. The presence of larvae in late November suggests that the eggs hatch in Spring.
