= Psilodraco =

Scientific classification
- Kingdom: Animalia
- Phylum: Chordata
- Class: Actinopterygii
- Order: Perciformes
- Family: Bathydraconidae
- Genus: Psilodraco; Norman, 1937
- Species: P. breviceps

Binomial name
- Psilodraco breviceps Norman, 1937

Species of fish

Psilodraco is a monotypic genus of marine ray-finned fish belonging to the family Bathydraconidae, the Antarctic dragonfishes. Its only species is Psilodraco breviceps. These fishes are native to the Southern Ocean.

== Taxonomy ==
Psilodraco was first described as a genus in 1937 by the British ichthyologist John Roxborough Norman when he was describing the only species in this monotypic genus, Psilodraco breviceps, the type of which had been collected by the Discovery Expedition off South Georgia.

The genus name compounds psilos, which means "naked", a reference Norman did not explain, but this species lacks any obvious scales; and draco, meaning "dragon", a common suffix used in name notothenioids. The specific name, breviceps, means "short head", this species having a shorter snout than Gymnodraco acuticeps.

== Description ==
Psilodraco has a naked, compressed body, the only scales being the imperforated scales that make up the five lateral lines. There is a strong ridge on the operculum which ends in a short, flattened spine and a flattened, hooked process. The snout is short, slightly concave and pointed. The mouth has a band of canine like teeth, made up of multiple series. The outermost series are enlarged, with the most enlarged behind the symphysis on the upper jaw. There are 28-30 soft rays in the dorsal fin and 27-29 in the anal fin. In alcohol this fish is brown, covered in darker spots, paler on the underside and on the fins. This species attains a maximum standard length of 20 cm (7.9 in).

== Distribution and habitat ==
Psilodraco is found in the Southern Ocean, where it is endemic to the insular shelf of South Georgia. This is a demersal species which is found at depths of 60 to 345 m (197 to 1,132 ft), typically between 248 and 345 m (814 and 1,132 ft).

== Biology ==
Psilodraco spawns in the late autumn and early winter, and the eggs probably hatch during the winter. A sampled female had ovaries which contained 1,340 eggs. It is a synchronous spawner.
