= Tupong =

Tupong may refer to:

- Pseudaphritis urvillii a fish in the family Pseudaphritidae
- Tupong (state constituency), represented in the Sarawak State Legislative Assembly
