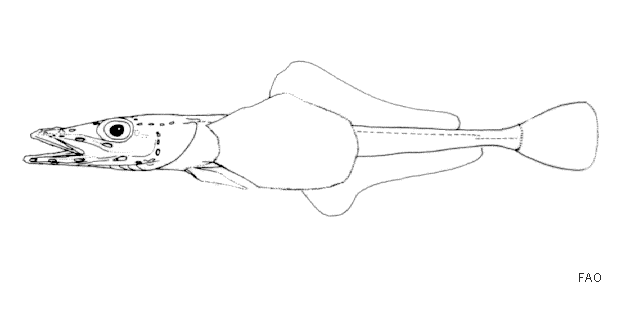

Scientific classification
- Kingdom: Animalia
- Phylum: Chordata
- Class: Actinopterygii
- Order: Perciformes
- Family: Bathydraconidae
- Genus: Vomeridens; H. H. DeWitt & Hureau, 1979
- Species: V. infuscipinnis

Binomial name
- Vomeridens infuscipinnis (H. H. DeWitt, 1964)

Synonyms
- Racovitzia infuscipinnis DeWitt, 1964

= Vomeridens =

Species of fish

Vomeridens is a monotypic genus of marine ray-finned fish belonging to the family Bathydraconidae, the Antarctic dragonfishes, its only species is Vomeridens infuscipinnis. These fishes are native to the Southern Ocean.

== Taxonomy ==
Vomeridens was first described as a genus in 1980 by the ichthyologists Hugh Hamilton DeWitt and Jean-Claude Hureau with its only species having been described by DeWitt as Racovitzia infuscipinnis in 1964. The type locality of R. infuscipinnis was given as the Weddell Sea. Its genus name vomeridens is a reference to the teeth on the vomer while the specific name infuscipinnis is a compound of infuscus meaning "dark brown" and "pinnis" which means "finned", a reference to the colour of the caudal fin.

== Description ==
Vomeridens has a body which is covered in ctenoid scales with two lateral lines consisting of tubular scales. The operculum has no spines or hooks. The jaws have bands of small conical teeth. There are no teeth on the palatines but specimens with a standard length greater than 10 cm (3.9 in) typically have teeth on the vomer. There are 31-34 soft rays in the dorsal fin while the anal fin has 31-32. This species attains a maximum standard length of 22 cm (8.7 in). In alcohol, the body and head are brown darker on the abdomen. The pelvic fins are dusky, the caudal fin is dark while the other fins are light coloured.

== Distribution, habitat and biology ==
Vomeridens is found in the Southern Ocean where it is known to occur in the Weddell and Ross seas, the South Orkney Islands and the Antarctic Peninsula. It is a bathydemersal species occurring at depth between 500 and 813 m (1,640 and 2,667 ft). It is a "rare" species. They have a reduced amount of bone and a high percentage of cartilage and lipids in their bodies which gives them near neutral buoyancy. This reduced body density means that this species probably forages in the water column, hovering over the substrate. Sampled stomach contents were wholly made up of krill (Euphausia superba), with some of these being 46 to 50 mm (1.8 to 2.0 in) in length. Seven females sampled had a fecundity of 1576 to 2296 ova.
