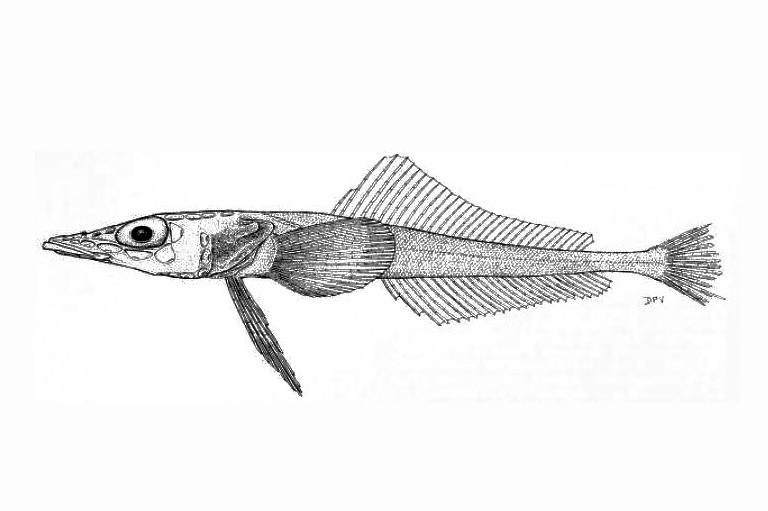

Conservation status
- Least Concern (IUCN 3.1)

Scientific classification
- Kingdom: Animalia
- Phylum: Chordata
- Class: Actinopterygii
- Order: Perciformes
- Family: Bathydraconidae
- Genus: Akarotaxis; H. H. DeWitt & Hureau, 1980
- Species: A. nudiceps

Binomial name
- Akarotaxis nudiceps (Waite, 1916)

Synonyms
- Bathydraco nudiceps Waite, 1916; Bathydraco wohlschlagi DeWitt & Tyler, 1960

= Akarotaxis =

Species of fish

Akarotaxis is a genus of marine ray-finned fish belonging to the family Bathydraconidae, the Antarctic dragonfish. There are two species: Akarotaxis nudiceps and Akarotaxis gouldae. They are found in the Southern Ocean along the continental shelf of Antarctica.

== Taxonomy ==
Akarotaxis was first described as a genus in 1980 by the American ichthyologist Hugh Hamilton DeWitt and the French ichthyologist Jean-Claude Hureau. Akarotaxis nudiceps was described in 1916 as Bathydraco nudiceps by the British-born Australian zoologist Edgar Ravenswood Waite with the type locality given as Queen Mary Land off the Shackleton Ice Shelf. The type was collected by the Australasian Antarctic Expedition. The generic name compounds akaro meaning "short" or "small" with "taxis" which means "line" or "row", a reference to the short upper lateral line, which comprises lees than 10 tubular scales. The specific name nudiceps means "naked head", thought to be an allusion to the absence of scales on the head despite Waite not mentioning this trait.

Akarotaxis gouldae was described in August 2024, based on specimens exclusively found in a 400 km stretch of coastline in the western Antarctic Peninsula, from Lapeyrère Bay in the north to Adelaide Island in the south. The describers refrain from citing this as strong evidence of distribution, as it may be an artifact of sampling bias. The specific name was coined in honor of the U.S. Antarctic Research and Supply Vessel Laurence M. Gould, and not the namesake of the vessel itself. A. gouldae was coined in the feminine form specifically to honor the ship, reflecting the practice of assigning ships female pronouns.

== Description ==
Akarotaxis has a slender, body which is covered in ctenoid scales and has two lateral lines, the upper lateral line having only 3-9 tubed scales in its anterior section with its posterior part being made up of poredscales which also make up the middle lateral line. The upper rear margin of the operculum has a small hook. They are equipped with small conical teeth arranged in bands. The dorsal fin has 29-33 soft rays while the anal fin has 25-28 soft rays. Specimens preserved in alcohol have a brown body with a darker head, a pale dorsal fin pale and the other fins being dusky. This species attains a maximum standard length of 13.0 cm (5.1 in).

== Distribution, habitat and biology ==
Akarotaxis is found almost all around the Antarctic continent from west of the Adelaide Island to the Ross Sea where it is a bathydemersal species found at depths between 371 to 915 m (1,217 to 3,002 ft) on the outer continental shelf and in deep troughs. It has the lowest known fecundity of the Antarctic dragonfishes, laying only 2000 eggs per female. Spawning takes place from mid to late summer.

== Threats ==
A. gouldae exhibit extremely low fecundity. They also associate with the ocean surface. Ergo, the budding Antarctic krill fishery in the region may capture A. gouldae larvae as bycatch, and thus imperil the species.
