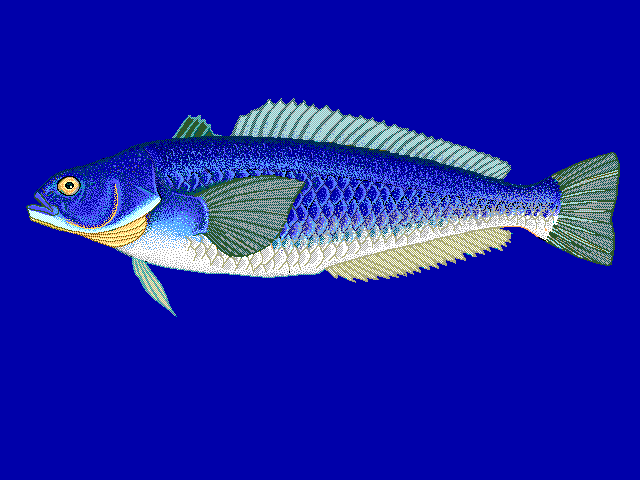
- Pamag u0

Scientific classification
- Kingdom: Animalia
- Phylum: Chordata
- Class: Actinopterygii
- Order: Perciformes
- Family: Nototheniidae
- Genus: Paranotothenia; Balushkin, 1976

Type species
- Gadus magellanicus J. R. Forster, 1801

= Paranotothenia =

Genus of fishes

Paranotothenia is a genus of marine ray-finned fishes belonging to the family Nototheniidae, the notothens or cod icefishes. These fishes are native to the Southern Ocean.

== Taxonomy ==
Paranotothenia was first formally described as a genus in 1976 by the Soviet ichthyologist Arkadii Vladimirovich Balushkin, it was originally a monotypic genus with Gadus magellanicus, which had been described in 1801 by Johann Reinhold Forster with the type locality given as the Straits of Magellan. as its type species. Some authorities place this genus in the subfamily Nototheniinae, but the 5th edition of Fishes of the World does not include subfamilies in the Nototheniidae. The genus name is a compound of para meaning "near" or "similar to" and Notothenia, the type genus of Nototheniidae, from which it differs by being short snouted and having crests above the eye.

== Species ==
The recognized species in this genus are:

- Paranotothenia dewitti Balushkin, 1990
- Paranotothenia magellanica (J. R. Forster, 1801) (Magellanic rockcod)

Notothenia trigramma is classified within this genus by some authorities, although FishBase retain it in the genus Notothenia pending further studies.

== Characteristics ==
Paranotothenia notothens are quite similar to this classified within the genus Notothenia. They have a wide head with a short snout and a mouth which reaches as far back as the middle of the eye. The front part of the snout is steep, with a prominent bulge before the eye. The eyes are noticeable more widely spaced than those of Notothenia. The wide cranium has a rough upper surface with lots of crests, bumps and pits. The crest over the eye extends rearwards quite far. The head is largely unscaled, although there are small patches of scales to the rear of the eyes. The majority of the body scales are non-ctenoid. The caudal fin ranges from forked in juveniles, emarginate or infrequently slightly rounded in larger individuals to emarginate in the largest fishes found off Antarctica. These fishes attain a maximum total length of 38 cm (15 in).

== Distribution, habitat and biology ==
Paranotothenia are found in the Southern Ocean as well as in the southwestern Atlantic including the Magellanic region of southern South America, southern Indian Ocean, and southwestern Pacific Oceans. They have pelagic larvae and juveniles and are benthic as adults. They feed mainly on crustaceans, some fishes, molluscs and algae.

== Fisheries ==
Paranotothenia notothens are uncommonly caught by commercial fisheries.
