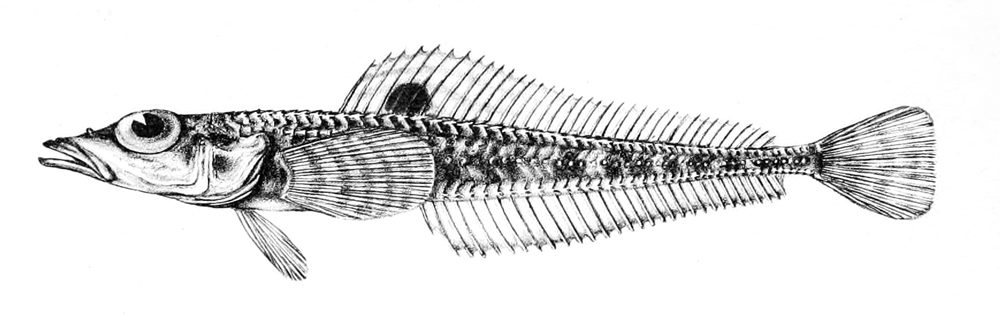

Scientific classification
- Kingdom: Animalia
- Phylum: Chordata
- Class: Actinopterygii
- Order: Perciformes
- Family: Bathydraconidae
- Genus: Prionodraco; Regan, 1914
- Species: P. evansii

Binomial name
- Prionodraco evansii Regan, 1914

= Prionodraco =

Species of fish

Prionodraco is a monotypic genus of marine ray-finned fish belonging to the family Bathydraconidae, the Antarctic dragonfishes, its only species is Prionodraco evansii. These fishes are native to the Southern Ocean.

== Taxonomy ==
Prionodraco was first described as a genus in 1914 by the British ichthyologist Charles Tate Regan when he was describing the only species in this monotypic genus Prionodraco evansii, the type of which had been collected by the Terra Nova Expedition in the Ross Sea and in McMurdo Sound. The genus name compounds prion which means "saw", a reference to V-shaped serrated bony plates on the flanks and draco meaning "dragon", a common suffix used in name notothenioids, while the specific name honours Edward Ratcliffe Garth Russell Evans the captain of the Terra Nova.

== Description ==
Prionodraco has a scaleless naked body with a quadrilateral cross-section which has scales only on the lateral lines and bony V-shaped plates with serrated margins situated along the angles of the body. There are two lateral lines, the middle line only having perforated scales while the upper one has tubed scales. The jaws are lined with bands of small conical teeth, some of which may be enlarged. The ridge on the operculum ends in a hooked spine. There are 34-38 soft rays in the dorsal fin while the anal fin has 28-33. This species attains a maximum total length of 15.5 cm (6.1 in) and a maximum published weight of 17 g (0.60 oz). In alcohol, the overall colour is brown with variably sized black spots on the head and body and a large dark spot on the dorsal fin.

== Distribution and habitat ==
Prionodraco occurs in the Southern Ocean and has been recorded from the South Orkney Islands and South Shetland Islands, the northern tip of Antarctic Peninsula as far south as 65°S and the continental shelf of Antarctica. They are demersal fishes which are found at depths of 70 to 550 m (230 to 1,800 ft).

== Biology ==
Prionodraco spawning appears to take place in the autumn and early winter. The eggs probably hatch in the following spring and the total length of the larvae at hatching is around 12 mm (0.47 in), the pelagic phase of the larvae is brief. Sexual maturity is reached at a total length of 10 cm (3.9 in). Their diet is dominated by polychaetes and benthic crustaceans.
