= Edward Meyrick =

English entomologist and schoolmaster (1854-1938)

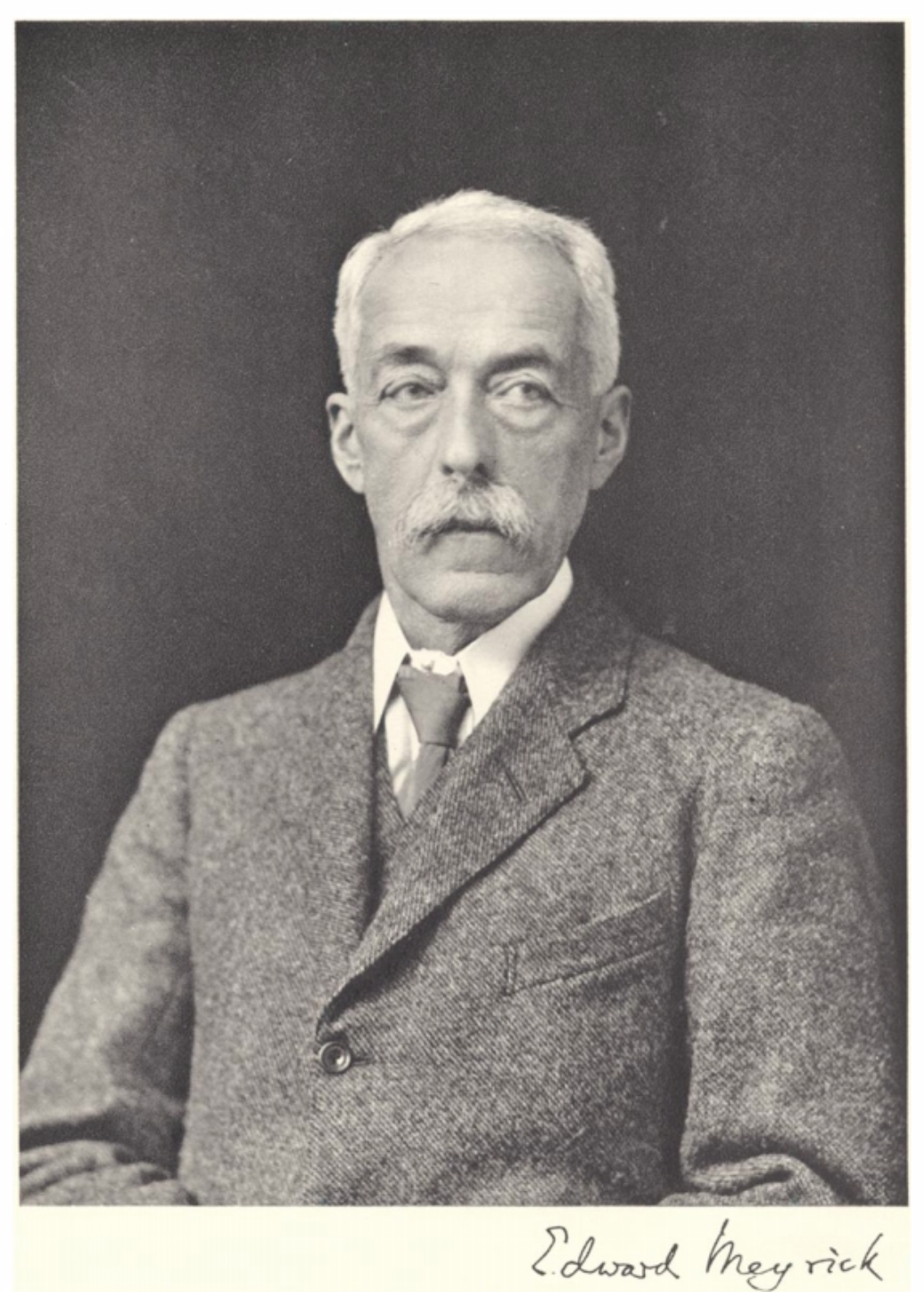
- Born: 25 November 1854; Ramsbury
- Died: 31 March 1938 (aged 83); Marlborough, Wiltshire
- Citizenship: British
- Education: Trinity College, Cambridge
- Known for: Handbook of British Lepidoptera (1895)
- Scientific career
- Fields: Lepidopterology
- Author abbrev. (zoology): Meyrick

Edward Meyrick (25 November 1854 – 31 March 1938) was an English schoolmaster and amateur entomologist. He was an expert on microlepidoptera and some consider him one of the founders of modern microlepidoptera systematics.

== Life and work ==
Edward Meyrick came from a clerical family and was born in Ramsbury on 25 November 1854 to the Rev. Edward Meyrick, until his marriage earlier that year a Fellow of Magdalen College, Oxford, and his wife Mary Batson of Ramsbury. He was educated at Marlborough College and Trinity College, Cambridge. He actively pursued his hobby during his schooling, and one colleague stated in 1872 that Meyrick "has not left a lamp, a paling, or a tree unexamined in which a moth could possibly, at any stage of its existence, lie hid." Meyrick began publishing notes on microlepidopterans in 1875, but when in December, 1877 he gained a post at The King's School, Parramatta, New South Wales, there were greater opportunities for indulging his interest. He stayed in Australia from 1877 until the end of 1886 working at Sydney Grammar School before returning to England to teach classics at Marlborough College and become a corresponding member of the Linnean Society of New South Wales. He was the author of the Handbook of British Lepidoptera (1895) and of Exotic Microlepidoptera (March 1912 – November 1937), the latter consisting of four complete volumes and part of a fifth. He also wrote a number of short papers.

Meyrick was a life-long member of the Conservative party, and spent twelve years as president of the East Wilts Unionist Association.

Meyrick was a fellow of the Royal Entomological Society of London and a fellow of the Royal Society. During his lifetime, he may have described more than 20,000 species of Lepidoptera. His huge collection of specimens (over 100,000) is at the Natural History Museum, London. It is believed that he had collected more specimens than anyone else. He encouraged scientific studies by amateurs and in a 1898 article, "Scientific Work in Local Societies" he pointed out lines of research for members of Natural History Societies. His studies of Australian and New Zealand lepidoptera led him to suggest that the two were not formerly connected. He made use of ideas along the lines of Dollo's laws to postulate principles to use to examine the evolution of the lepidoptera. In his Handbook of British Lepidoptera (1895) he stated that (1) No new organ can be produced except as a modification of some previously existing structure; (2) A lost organ cannot be regained; and (3) A rudimentary organ is rarely re-developed.

Edward Meyrick died after a brief illness on 31 March 1938 in Marlborough, Wiltshire, and is buried in the churchyard at Ramsbury, Wiltshire.

== See also ==
- Category:Taxa named by Edward Meyrick
