= Arkadii Vladimirovich Balushkin =

Soviet and Russian ichthyologist (1948–2021)

Arkady Vladimirovich Balushkin
- Born: 14 January 1948; Moscow, Russian SFSR, Soviet Union
- Died: 11 February 2021 (aged 73); Moscow, Russia
- Citizenship: Soviet → Russian
- Education: Perm State University
- Known for: Research on notothenioid fishes
- Awards: Lev Berg Medal (2020)
- Scientific career
- Fields: Ichthyology, morphology, systematics, zoogeography
- Workplaces: Zoological Institute of the Russian Academy of Sciences
- Doctoral advisor: Anatoly Andriyashev

Arkady Vladimirovich Balushkin (14 January 1948 – 11 February 2021) was a Soviet and Russian ichthyologist who headed the Ichthyology Laboratory of the Zoological Institute of the Russian Academy of Sciences (ZIN RAS). He was a leading specialist in the systematics, morphology, evolution, and biogeography of notothenioid fishes and the ichthyofauna of Antarctica. He was awarded the Lev Berg Medal in 2020.

== Biography ==
Balushkin was born on 14 January 1948 in Moscow, Soviet Union. During his childhood, he moved with his parents to Perm, where he completed secondary school.

In 1971, he graduated from the Faculty of Biology of Perm State University. After graduation, he entered postgraduate study at the Zoological Institute of the Academy of Sciences of the Soviet Union, where his academic supervisor was the prominent ichthyologist and corresponding member of the Academy of Sciences of the Soviet Union, Anatoly Andriyashev, one of the world's early researchers of Antarctic fishes.

From 1975 to 1977, Balushkin worked in the Fish Breeding Laboratory of the State Research Institute of Lake and River Fisheries (GosNIORKh), after which he returned to the Zoological Institute.

In 1978, he defended his Candidate of Biological Sciences dissertation, titled Morphological Foundations of the Systematics and Phylogeny of Notothenias (Notothenia Richardson and Related Genera).

In 1984, a monograph based on the expanded material of his dissertation was published in Russia. The work brought him international recognition and was subsequently published in English in the United States, India, and the Netherlands in 1989–1990.

From 1983 to 1984, Balushkin participated in an expedition to West Antarctica aboard the research vessel Gizhiga, where he studied Antarctic fishes. Based on material obtained during the expedition, together with previously accumulated data, he published the influential 1992 paper "Classification, Relationships and Origin of the Families of the Suborder of Notothenioid Fishes (Notothenioidei, Perciformes)" in the journal Voprosy Ikhtiologii.

In 1997, he defended his Doctor of Biological Sciences dissertation, titled Morphology, Classification and Evolution of Notothenioid Fishes of the Southern Ocean.

In 1998, he became head of the Ichthyology Laboratory of the Zoological Institute.

During the 1990s, Balushkin and the noted researcher of the seas of the Russian Far East V. V. Fyodorov served as observers on three voyages of the Japanese fishing vessel Tora-Maru 58. Their work resulted in a series of papers describing species and genera new to science, including members of the families Liparidae, Zoarcidae, deep-sea anglerfish, and other groups of fishes.

== Scientific activity ==
Balushkin conducted research into comparative and evolutionary morphology, systematics, and historical biogeography of fishes. He was regarded as a leading expert on the ichthyofauna of Antarctica and specialized in the systematics and biogeography of numerous groups of fishes of the world's oceans.

His long-term studies of fishes of the Southern Ocean laid the foundations for modern classification of notothenioid fishes and examined the evolutionary and historical development of the suborder.

Together with researchers from the Ichthyology Laboratory, Balushkin studied Antarctic toothfish and other notothenioid fishes. He described the new genus Halaphrites in the family Pseudaphritidae and conducted systematic and distributional studies of Antarctic platyrostrids, Antarctic dragonfishes, and icefish.

In 2011, he co-authored the monograph Antarctic Platyrostrids (Batrhydraconidae), devoted to the patterns of morphological evolution, phylogeny, distribution, and systematics of fishes of the family Bathydraconidae.

He also actively investigated the systematics and zoogeography of other Antarctic and subantarctic fishes, including deep-sea anglerfishes, snailfishes, Muraenolepididae, Congiopodidae, and eelpouts. He established the family Bathylutichthyidae for the new genus Bathylutichthys.

Balushkin compiled a series of catalogues of the fish collections held by the Ichthyology Laboratory of the Zoological Institute, covering fishes of the orders Aulopiformes, Myctophiformes, Esociformes, Percopsiformes, Ophidiiformes, Batrachoidiformes, and Lophiiformes, as well as the families Zoarcidae, Stichaeidae, Pholidae, and Anarhichadidae.

He was the author or co-author of four monographs and five catalogues and published more than 160 scientific papers.

Balushkin served on the editorial boards of Voprosy Ikhtiologii (Journal of Ichthyology), Fisheries and Fish Farming, Proceedings of the Zoological Institute, and the Bulletin of Perm University.

He participated in the work of the Russian Academy of Sciences Scientific Council on Ichthyology and Hydrobiology and served on the Academic and Dissertation Councils of the Zoological Institute. He was also a member of the Ichthyological Commission's scientific council.

Seven species of extant and fossil fishes newly described to science have been named in his honor.

== Awards ==
- Lev Berg Medal (2020) – for a series of works on the morphology, systematics, and historical biogeography of Antarctic fishes.
