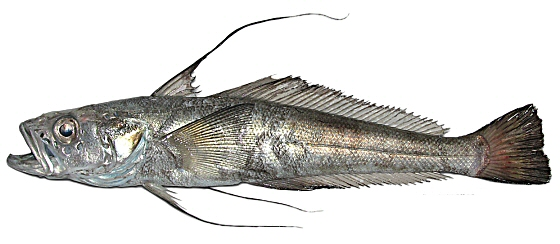

Scientific classification
- Kingdom: Animalia
- Phylum: Chordata
- Class: Actinopterygii
- Order: Perciformes
- Family: Nototheniidae
- Genus: Aethotaxis; H. H. DeWitt, 1962
- Species: A. mitopteryx

Binomial name
- Aethotaxis mitopteryx H. H. DeWitt, 1962

= Longfin icedevil =

Species of fish

The longfin icedevil (Aethotaxis mitopteryx), also known as the threadfin pinhead, is a species of marine ray-finned fish belonging to the family Nototheniidae, the notothens or cod icefishes. It is native to the Southern Ocean where it can be found at depths down to 850 metres (2,790 ft). This species grows to a length of 42 centimetres (17 in) TL. This species is the only known member of its genus and is of no interest to commercial fisheries.

== Taxonomy ==
The longfin icedevil was first formally described in 1962 by the American ichthyologist Hugh H. DeWitt with the type locality given as off Pram Point on Ross Island in McMurdo Sound, Antarctica at 77°53'S, 166°44'E, the type being picked up dead at the surface. Dewitt placed the new species in the monotypic genus Aethotaxis in which it is still the only species. The species is sometimes split into 2 subspecies, with A.m. pawsoni proposed as a subspecies in the Weddell Sea and the Scotia Sea but this requires more evidence. Some authorities place this taxon in the subfamily Pleuragrammatinae, but the 5th edition of Fishes of the World does not include subfamilies in the Nototheniidae. The genus name Aethotaxis is a compound of ethes, which means "unusual" or "strange", and taxis meaning "line" an allusion to the unusual lateral-line system in which the upper lateral line curves up nearly vertically for a short distance beneath the forward rays of the second dorsal fin before suddenly turning towards the caudal fin. The specific name mitopteryx compounds mitos meaning "thread" or "string" with "pteryx" meaning "fin" a reference to the filaments extending out from the first dorsal and pelvic fins.

== Description ==
The longfin icedevil has an elongated, moderately compressed body with a flattened head with a long snout. The large mouth is oblique with a projecting lower jaw, both jaws are equipped with a thin band of villiform teeth. The sensory canals on the head are enlarged, their pores are large holes or pits. They have an upper lateral line made up of tubed scales which curves steeply upward below forward rays of the second dorsal fin, then turns sharply towards the rear running close to the base of the second dorsal fin and extending to just underneath the rearmost rays of that fin. They also have a middle and lower lateral line. There are no scales on the snout, in front of the eyes or on the top of the head. The first dorsal fin contains 7 rays, the first two of which are extended into long filaments. The second dorsal fin has 34 soft rays and the anal fin has 30. The uppermost ray of each pelvic fin are also elongated into filaments. The caudal fin is rounded. This species attains a maximum total length of 42 cm (17 in). They are grey in colour with a violet tint, paler below with a metallic sheen.

== Distribution and habitat ==
The longfin icedevil is found in the Southern Ocean where it has been recorded from the islands of the Scotia Sea, Weddell Sea, Prydz Bay and the Ross Sea. It is a pelagic fish which is found at depths down to 850 m (2,790 ft).

== Biology ==
The longfin icedevil stores lipids in their adipose tissue and have reduced calcium in their bones to help their buoyancy. This species is thought to be pelagic but some studies have suggested that it is a benthopelagic sit and wait predator which will venture into the pelagic zone. It does not uses its pectoral fins to rest on the bottom as the rays are too soft but uses them for swimming rather than the caudal fin. Larval fish are more abundant in different areas from the adults suggesting that a spawning migration is undertaken. Their characteristics of their blood suggest that they have a slow growth and rather slow lifestyle, adapted to reduce the fish's energy requirements. These fishes have a high reproductive rate and reach early sexual maturity but have a long lifespan.
