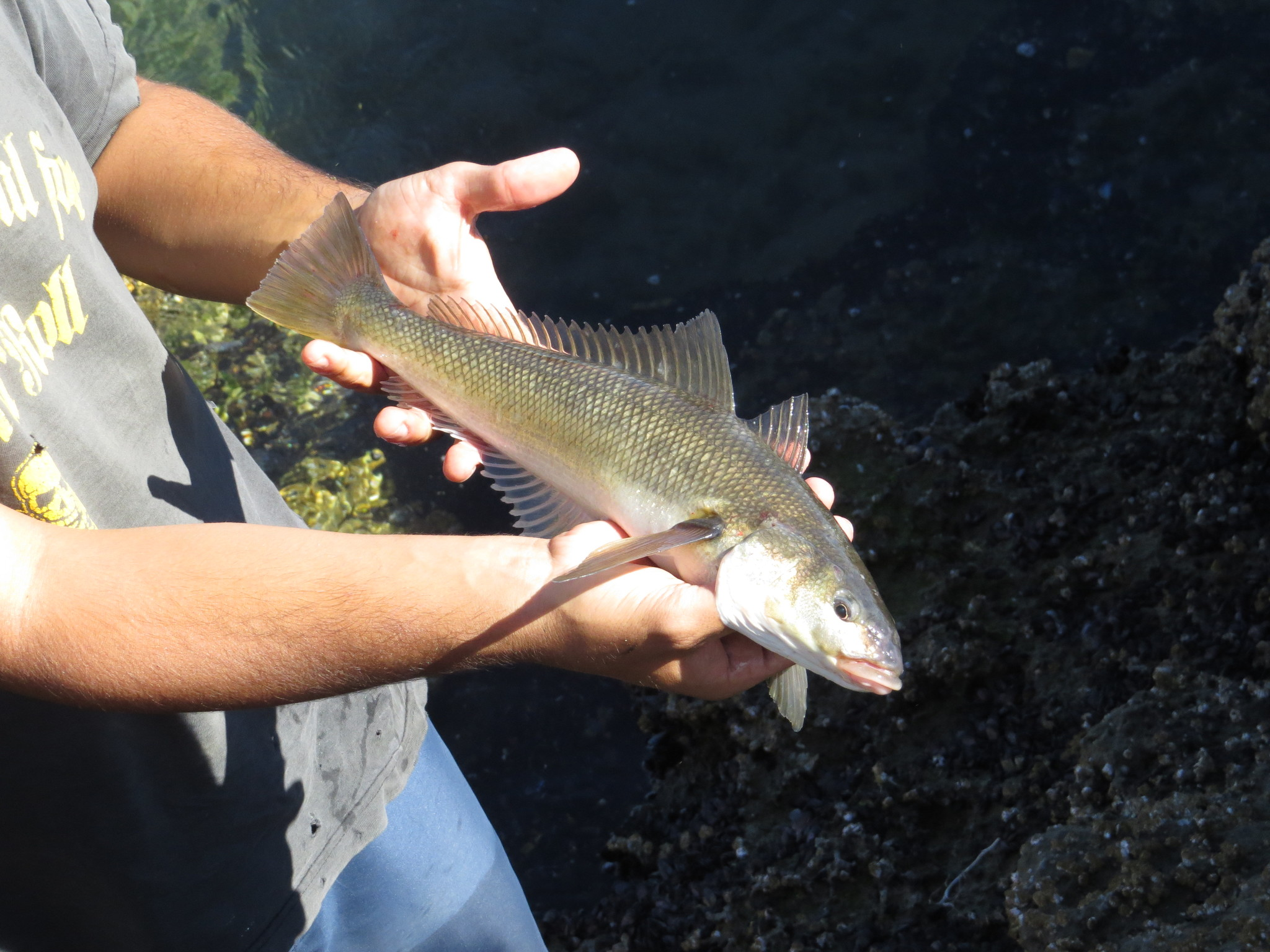
- Eleginopidae

Scientific classification
- Kingdom: Animalia
- Phylum: Chordata
- Class: Actinopterygii
- Order: Perciformes
- Suborder: Notothenioidei
- Family: Eleginopidae; T. N. Gill, 1893
- Genus: Eleginops; T. N. Gill, 1862
- Species: E. maclovinus

Binomial name
- Eleginops maclovinus (G. Cuvier, 1830)

Synonyms
- Eleginus maclovinus G. Cuvier, 1830; Aphritis porosus Jenyns, 1842; Pseudaphritis porosus (Jenyns, 1842)

= Patagonian blennie =

Species of fish

The Patagonian blennie (Eleginops maclovinus), also known as the rock cod, is a species of marine ray-finned fish, belonging to the monotypic family Eleginopidae and monotypic genus Eleginops. It is found in coastal and estuarine habitats around southernmost South America.

== Taxonomy ==
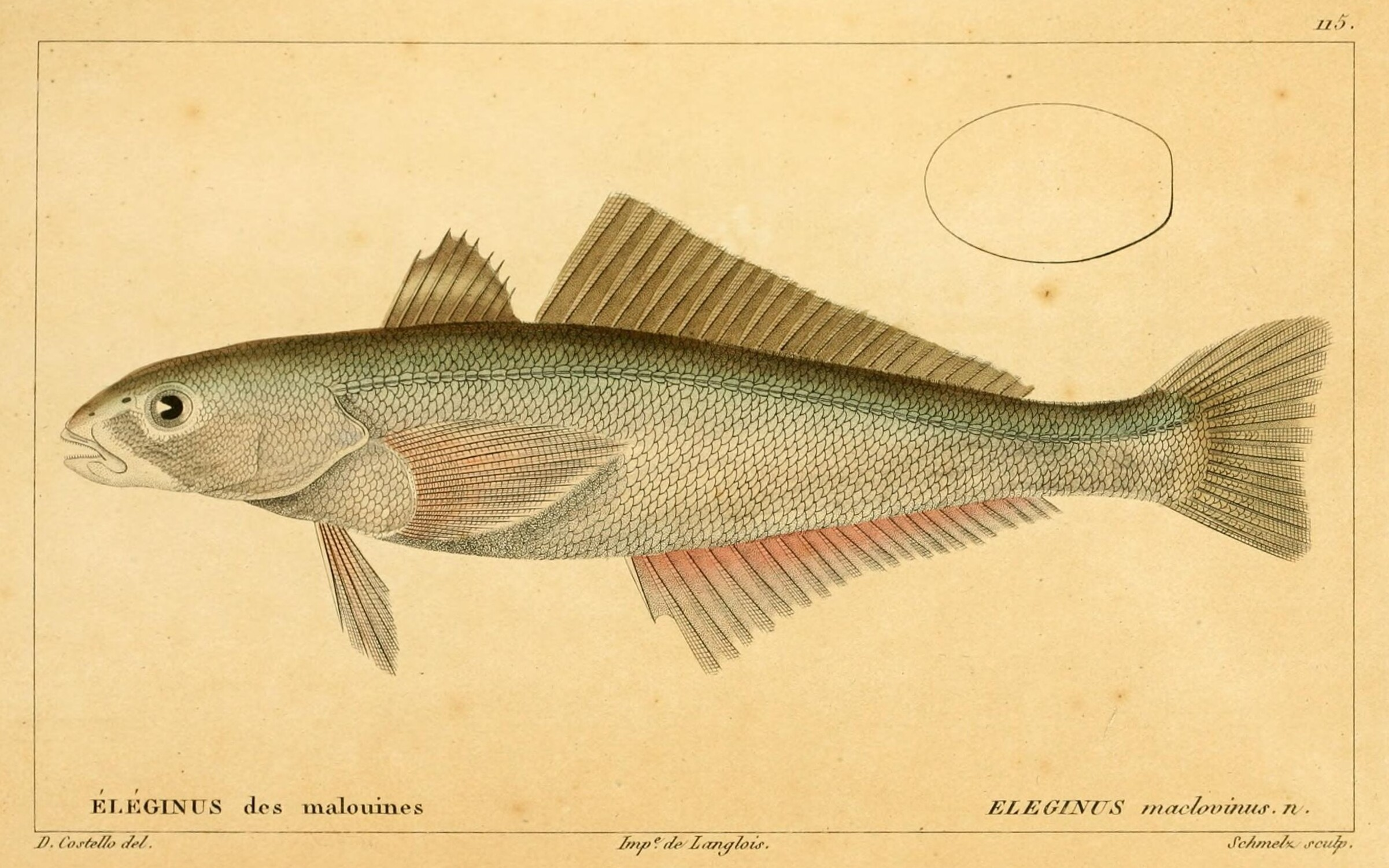
Illustration of the Patagonian blennie as Eleginus maclovinus from the early XIX century.

The Patagonian blennie was first formally described in 1830 as Eleginus maclovinus by the French zoologist Georges Cuvier with the type locality given as the Falkland Islands. Cuvier's genus name was later shown to be unavailable as it was a junior synonym of the cod genus Eleginus described by Gotthelf Fischer von Waldheim in 1813, Theodore Nicholas Gill renamed the genus as Eleginops, meaning "similar to Eleginus in 1862. Gill then placed it in the monotypic family Eleginopidae in 1893. The specific name maclovinus means belonging to the Maclove Islands, an old name for the Falkland Islands. The Eleginopidae are the sister family of the Bovichtidae and Pseudaphritidae and these are all sister to the rest of the families in the Notothenioidei which have been placed in the suggested superfamily Cryonotothenioidea.

== Description ==
The Patagonian blennie has 7-8 spines in its first dorsal fin and 23-27 soft rays in its second dorsal fin. The caudal fin is emarginate. The colour of the body is blue brown above and silvery yellow below. Both dorsal fins are greyish in colour and the caudal fin is brownish and these fins have yellowish margins. The anal fin is light brown. It reaches about 105 cm (3.44 ft) in length.

== Distribution and habitat ==
The Patagonian blennie is found in the southeastern Pacific and southwestern Atlantic Ocean from Valparaiso in Chile south to Tierra del Fuego and north along the coast of Patagonia in Argentina, It is also found around the Falkland Islands. They are found in coastal, estuarine, and tidally influenced rivers.

== Biology ==
The Patagonian blennie is an omnivore, tending towards carnivore. In some parts of its range, it is especially fond of Paracorophium, but it is opportunistic, and its exact diet depends on the availability in the habitat where the individual fish lives. It can live for up to 10 years. It appears to be a protandrous hermaphrodite, in one study males were found at lengths between 19 and 45 cm (7.5 and 17.7 in) while females were found at 27 and 58 cm (11 and 23 in) which suggested that the sex change from male to female took place at ages between 2 and 7 years old.

== Fisheries ==
The Patagonian blennie is commonly fished in parts of its range. There have been trials for the use of this species as a cleaner fish to control sea lice in the aquaculture of salmonids in Chile.

== Human culture ==
The Patagonian blennie has been featured on a stamp in the Falkland Islands issued in 1994. In Argentina and Chile, it is often called róbalo, a name also used for the common snook.

=== Religious significance to the indigenous people ===
The abundant and nutritious patagonian blennies were apparently not consumed by the indigenous people of Tierra del Fuego. Rock art suggests the fish may have had some religious significance.

== See also ==
- List of fish families
