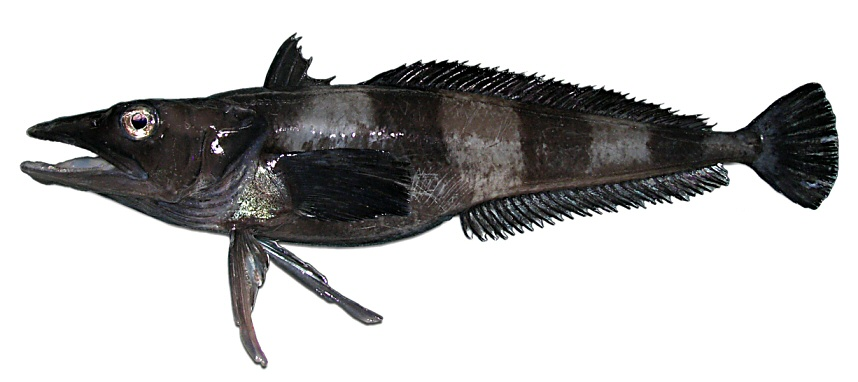

Scientific classification
- Kingdom: Animalia
- Phylum: Chordata
- Class: Actinopterygii
- Order: Perciformes
- Family: Channichthyidae
- Genus: Chionobathyscus; Andriashev & Neyelov, 1978
- Species: C. dewitti

Binomial name
- Chionobathyscus dewitti Andriashev & Neyelov, 1978

= Chionobathyscus =

Genus of fishes

Chionobathyscus dewitti is a species of marine ray-finned fish belonging to the family Channichthyidae, the crocodile icefishes. This species is found in the Southern Ocean.

== Taxonomy ==
Chionobathyscus was first described as a genus in 1978 by the ichthyologists Anatoly Petrovich Andriyashev and Alexei Vladimovich Neyelov when they were describing the only species in this genus Chionobathyscus dewitti, the type of which had been collected in the Eastern Antarctic Ocean at 67°31'S, 33°05'W. The genus name is a compound of chionos which means "snow", although in this case this is alluding to the relationship of this taxon with the genus Chionodraco, and bathyscus which means "inhabitant of the deep", a reference to the depths at which this species is found. The specific name honours the American ichthyologist, marine biologist and oceanographer Hugh Hamilton DeWitt in recognition of his work on Antarctic fishes.

== Description ==
Chionobathyscus dewitti has a vestigial spine on the snout, really just a small knob. There are 3 or 4 branched spines on the operculum. There are 3 lateral lines which do not have bony plates. The pelvic fin is elongated and has thickened skin at their tips. The first and second dorsal fins are clearly separated. Within the dorsal fin there are 5 or 6 spines and 39 or 40 soft rays while the anal fin has 33 or 34 soft rays. They are an overall gray colour, paler centrally, with juveniles being a lighter colour than adults. There body is marked with 5 wide bars and the fins are pale except for the rear parts of the pectoral and caudal fins. This species attains a maximum total length of 60 cm (24 in).

== Distribution, habitat and biology ==
Chionobathyscus dewitti is found in the Southern Ocean and is probably circum-Antarctic on the continental shelf and slope. It is a bathydemersal species with a depth range of 500 to 2,000 m (1,600 to 6,600 ft). The adults feed largely on fishes krill. They have been caught in prespawning condition in February.
