= Mote sculpin =

Scientific classification
- Kingdom: Animalia
- Phylum: Chordata
- Class: Actinopterygii
- Order: Perciformes
- Suborder: Scorpaenoidei
- Family: Normanichthyidae; H. W. Clark, 1937
- Genus: Normanichthys; H. W. Clark, 1937
- Species: N. crockeri

Binomial name
- Normanichthys crockeri H. W. Clark, 1937

Species of fish

The mote sculpin (Normanichthys crockeri), also known as the barehead scorpionfish, is a ray-finned fish, the only member of the monotypic genus Normanichthys, family Normanichthyidae and suborder Normanichthyiodei. Common names for the species in Spanish include camotillo (in Peru) and bacaladillo (in Chile).

== Taxonomy ==
The mote sculpin was first described by the American zoologist Howard Walton Clark in 1937 from the harbour at Valparaiso in Chile. The fish seemed to have few affinities with other known species, and a new genus and family were erected to accommodate it. This fish is classified within the order Scorpaeniformes in the 5th edition of Fishes of the World but it is so unusual that it is placed in its own suborder Normanichthyiodei and family Normanichthyidae. Other authorities differ and do not consider the Scorpaeniformes to be a valid order because the Perciformes is not monophyletic without the taxa within the Scorpaeniformes being included within it. The generic name Normanichthys being given in honour of the British ichthyologist John Roxborough Norman who was taking part in Discovery Investigations at the time, undertaking research into whales and their ecology in the Southern Ocean. Norman gave a paratype to Carl Leavitt Hubbs who wrote a short, unpublished description that Clark used in his description, Clarke appended ichthys, meaning "fish", to Norman's surname. The specific name honours Charles Templeton Crocker, a San Francisco based philanthropist and self-proclaimed explorer, the holotype was collected from his yacht Zaca in 1934-35.

== Description ==
The mote sculpin is a fairly slender fish with a maximum length of about 11 cm (4.3 in), with the anus approximately halfway along the body. It has 1 spine and 5 pelvic fin rays, and 7 and 6 principal rays in the caudal fin. Internally, it has 36 to 37 myomeres (blocks of muscle). The body is covered with ctenoid scales, the head is unarmoured and there is a single spine and 5 fin rays in the pelvic fins. There are no ribs. This fish reaches a maximum published total length of 11 cm (4.3 in).

== Distribution and habitat ==
The mote sculpin is found in tropical South Pacific waters, from Chimbote, Peru, to Isla Mocha, Chile, where it is found at depths from 37 to 200 m (121 to 656 ft).
