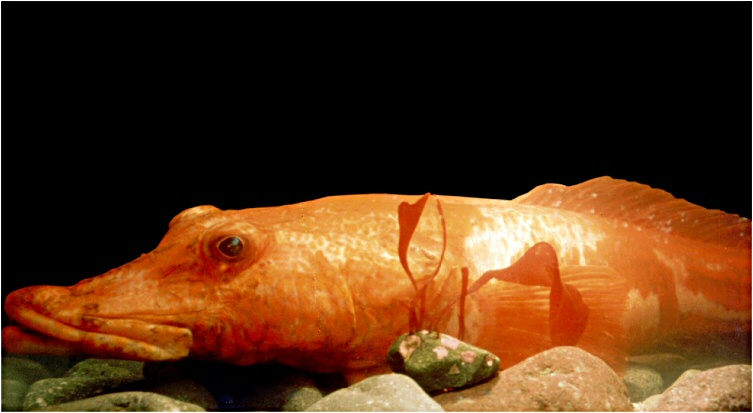
- Parachaenichthys charcoti

Scientific classification
- Kingdom: Animalia
- Phylum: Chordata
- Class: Actinopterygii
- Order: Perciformes
- Family: Bathydraconidae
- Genus: Parachaenichthys; Boulenger, 1902

Type species
- Chaenichthys georgianus Fischer, 1885

= Parachaenichthys =

Genus of fishes

Parachaenichthys is a genus of marine ray-finned fish belonging to the family Bathydraconidae, the Antarctic dragonfishes. They are found in the Southern Ocean around Antarctica.

== Taxonomy ==
Parachaenichthys was first described as a genus in 1902 by the Belgian-born British ichthyologist George Albert Boulenger with Chaenichthys georgianus designated as the type species by monotypy, i.e. it was the only species in the new genus at the time of genus description. Chaenichthys georgianus had been described in 1885 by the German zoologist J.G. Fischer with the type locality given as South Georgia. The genus name Parachaenichthys is a compound of para meaning "near" or "similar to" and Chaenichthys, i.e. Channichthys the genus P. georgianus was originally placed in by Fischer.

== Species ==
There are currently two recognised species in this genus:

- Parachaenichthys charcoti (Vaillant, 1906)
- Parachaenichthys georgianus (J. G. Fischer, 1885)

== Characteristics ==
Parachaenichthys dragonfishes have a naked body, lacking in scales, except for lateral line scales. They have a long, broad snout and the jaws have multiple bands of small, canine-like teeth. The operculum has a clear ridge which splits up into subridges towards the rear margin, each of these subridges ends in a spine. P. charcoti attains a maximum standard length of 42 cm (17 in) while P. georgianus reaches 59 cm (23 in).

== Distribution, habitat and biology ==
Parachaenichthys dragonfishes are found in the Southern Ocean with P. georgianus restricted to South Georgia and the South Sandwich Islands while P. charcoti is found at the South Orkney Islands, South Shetland Islands and Elephant Island, as well as at the tip of the Antarctic Peninsula south as far as 65°S. They are demersal fishes found at depths ranging from 2 to 400 m (6 ft 7 in to 1,312 ft 4 in). These fishes feed on other fishes and crustaceans.
