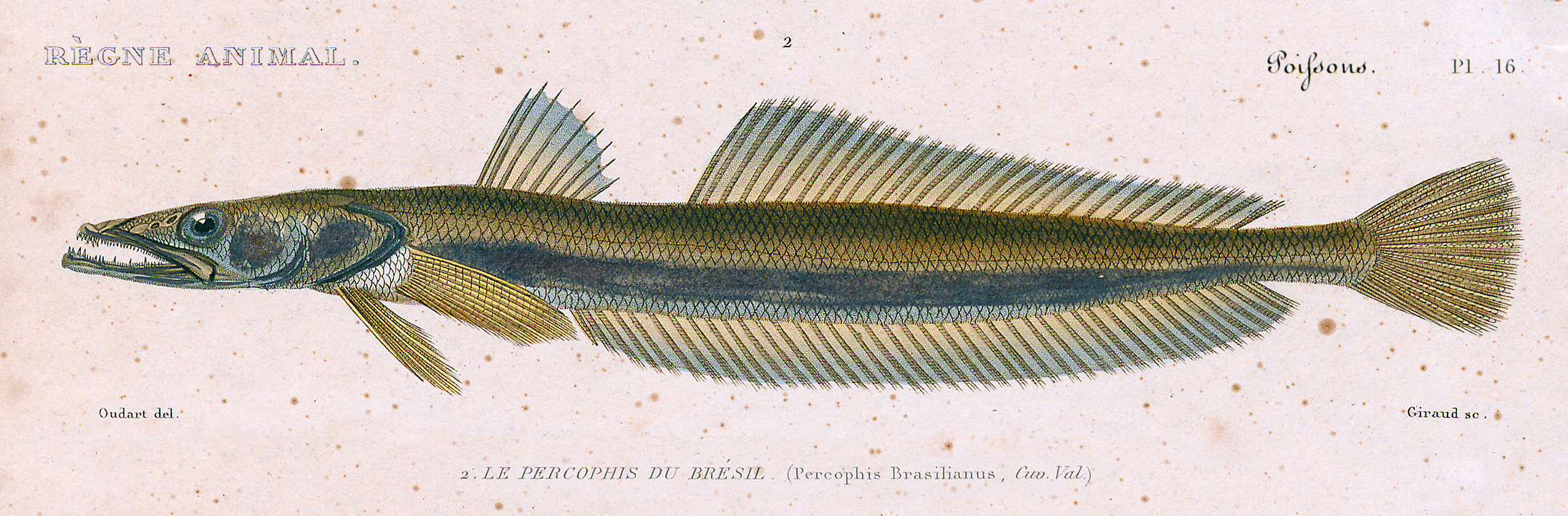
- A depiction of Percophis brasiliensis in Le Règne Animal (Georges Cuvier).

Scientific classification
- Kingdom: Animalia
- Phylum: Chordata
- Class: Actinopterygii
- Order: Perciformes
- Suborder: Notothenioidei
- Family: Percophidae; Swainson, 1839
- Genus: Percophis; Quoy & Gaimard, 1825
- Species: P. brasiliensis

Binomial name
- Percophis brasiliensis Quoy & Gaimard, 1825

Synonyms
- Percophis brasilianus (Misspelling)

= Brazilian flathead =

Species of ray-finned fish

The Brazilian flathead (Percophis brasiliensis) is a species of ray-finned fish which is the only species of the genus Percophis in the monotypic family Percophidae. It is considered the most basal member of the Notothenioidei, which also contains the Antarctic icefishes. It occurs in the southwestern Atlantic off the South American coast from southern Brazil to central Argentina. It is fished commercially, and is considered overfished in southern Brazil.

Percophidae was first proposed as a family in 1839 by the English zoologist William Swainson as a subfamily of the Percidae. The 5th edition of Fishes of the World classified this family within the order Trachiniformes and included the Bembropinae and Hemerocoetinae within it as subfamilies. However, more recent phylogenetic studies have found such a placement to be paraphyletic, and have recognized it as a monotypic family within the Notothenioidei containing a single species.
