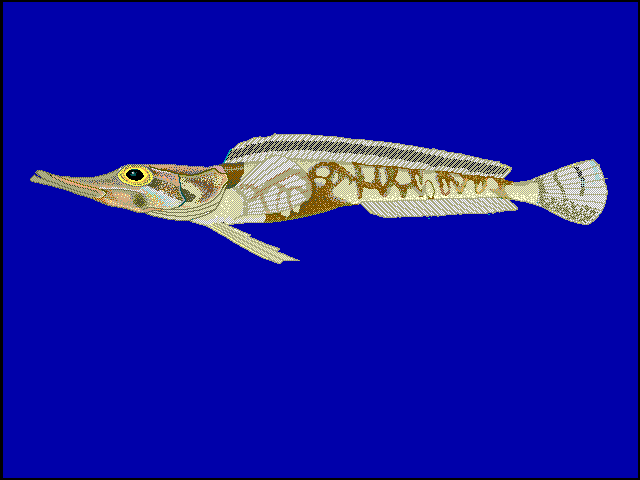

Scientific classification
- Kingdom: Animalia
- Phylum: Chordata
- Class: Actinopterygii
- Order: Perciformes
- Family: Bathydraconidae
- Genus: Cygnodraco; Waite, 1916
- Species: C. mawsoni

Binomial name
- Cygnodraco mawsoni Waite, 1916

= Mawson's dragonfish =

Species of fish

Mawson's dragonfish (Cygnodraco mawsoni) is a species of Antarctic dragonfish native to the Southern Ocean around Antarctica. It is found at depths of from 110 to 300 metres (360 to 980 ft) over the continental shelf. This species is the only known member of its genus.

== Taxonomy ==
Mawson's dragonfish was first formally described in 1916 by the British-born Australian ichthyologist Edgar Ravenswood Waite with the type locality given as Queen Mary Land off Drygalski Island where it was collected by the Australian Antarctic Expedition. Waite described it as the only species in a monotypic genus. The genus name is a combination of cygnus meaning "swan", an allusion Waite did not explain but may be a reference to the somewhat duck-bill shaped snout, and draco which means "dragon", a common suffix used In Notothenioid fishes. The specific name honours the Australian geologist Douglas Mawson who led the Australasian Antarctic Expedition.

== Description ==
Mawson's dragonfish has a slender, naked body with the only scales being in the two lateral lines, the upper lateral line is wholly made up of perforated scales. There is a flattened ridge on the operculum which divides towards the margin. They have a thin band of conical teeth in the jaws. The dorsal fin has 61-66 soft rays while the anal fin has 36-38. In alcohol the overall colour is brown with darker saddles and bars, the median fins are darker than the pectoral and pelvic fins. This species grows to a length of 41 cm (16 in) standard length.

== Distribution and habitat ==
Mawson's dragonfish is found in the Southern Ocean over the Antarctic continental shelf. It is a demersal species found at depths of 110 to 300 m (360 to 980 ft).

== Biology ==
Mawson's dragonfish in the Weddell Sea are adult at 20 cm (7.9 in) and start breeding at 26 cm (10 in). Spawning takes place during the autumn and early winter. They feed largely on benthic and benthopelagic organisms such as fishes, especially rockcods in the genus Trematomus and the decapod Notocrangon antarcticus as well as mysids, gammarids and polychaetes.
