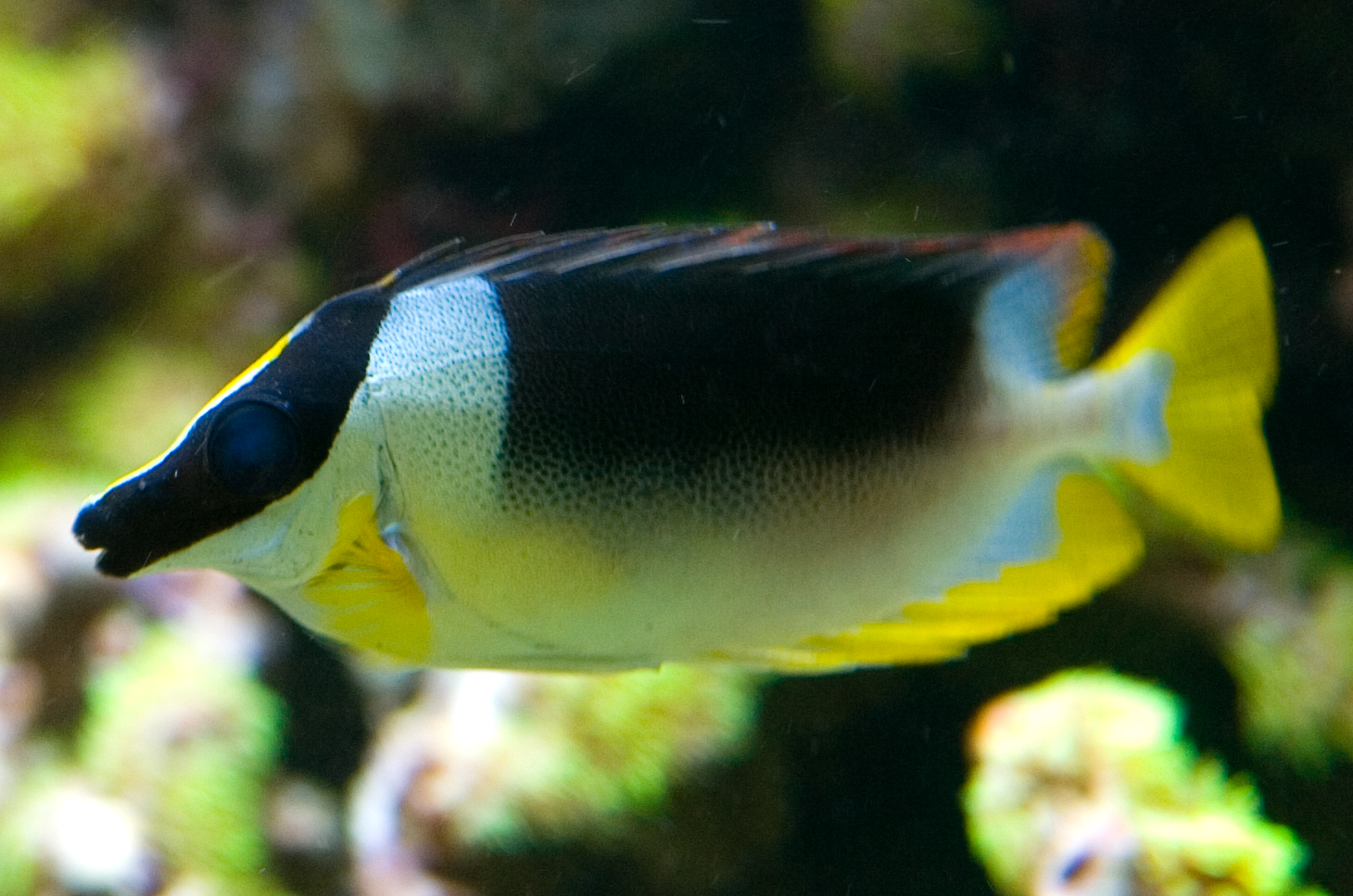
- Siganus magnificus
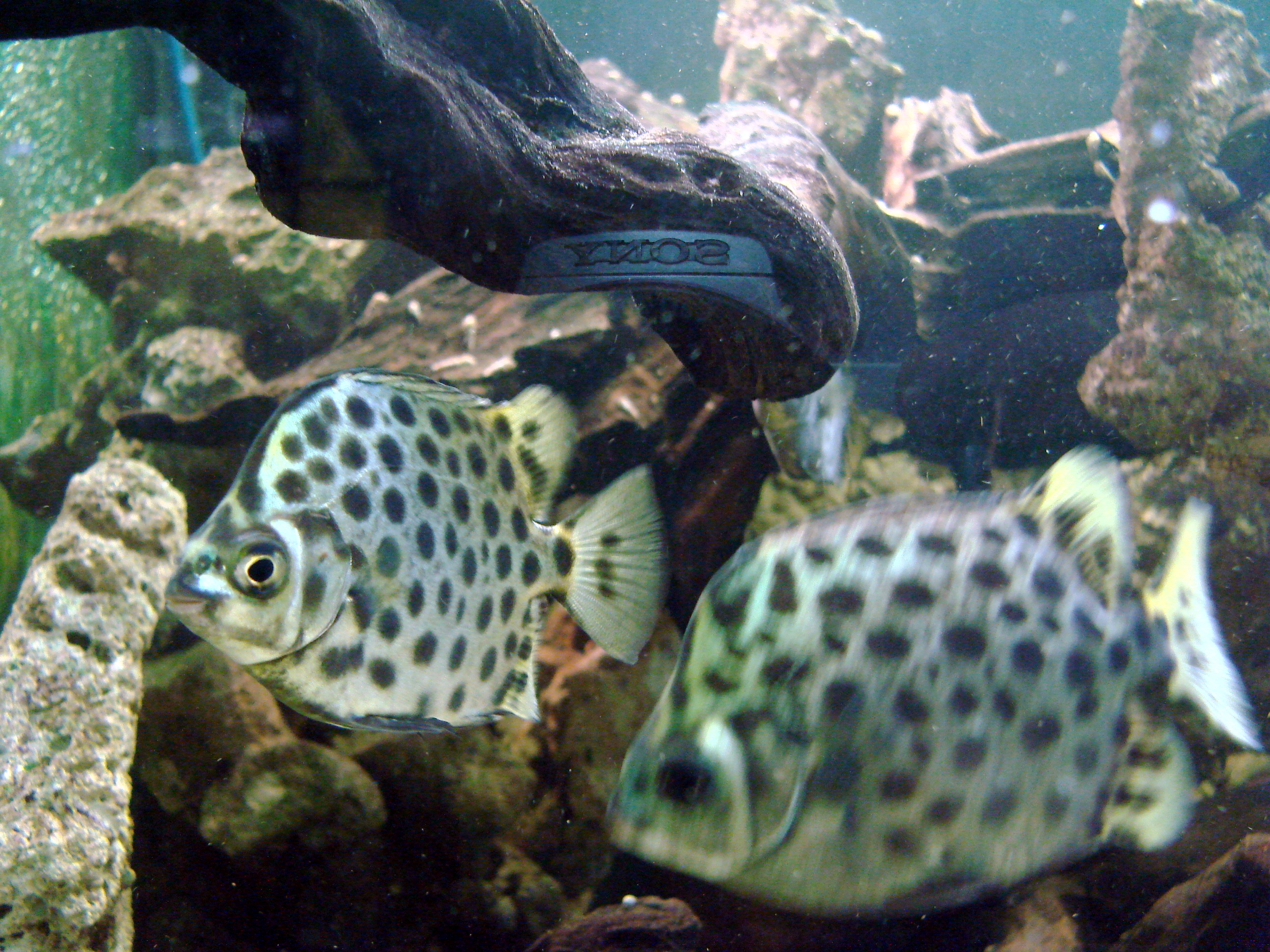
- Scatophagus argus

Scientific classification
- Kingdom: Animalia
- Phylum: Chordata
- Class: Actinopterygii
- Order: Perciformes
- Suborder: Percoidei
- Superfamily: Siganoidea

= Siganoidea =

Superfamily of fishes

Siganoidea is a superfamily belonging to the suborder Acanthuroidei which in turn is part of the order Acanthuriformes. It contains two families of largely Indo-Pacific distribution.

== Taxonomy ==
Siganoidea is recognised by the 5th edition of the Fishes of the World as a superfamily within the Percoidei.

=== Families ===
The two families placed in the Siganoidea are:

- Scatophagidae Gill, 1883
- Siganidae Richardson, 1837

=== Molecular studies ===
Molecular analyses suggest that these families are closer to the surgeonfishes than to other Percoidei and place these families in the order Acanthuriformes. Other workers have suggested that the two families are among those stated as incertae sedis with the series Eupercaria.
