= Ploughfish =

Scientific classification
- Kingdom: Animalia
- Phylum: Chordata
- Class: Actinopterygii
- Division: Teleostei
- Order: Perciformes
- Family: Bathydraconidae
- Genus: Gymonodraco; Boulenger, 1902
- Species: G. acuticeps

Binomial name
- Gymnodraco acuticeps Boulenger, 1902

Synonyms
- Gymnodraco victori Hureau, 1963

Species of fish

Gymnodraco acuticeps, commonly known as the ploughfish, is a benthic fish native to the Southern Ocean, around Antarctica.

== Taxonomy ==
The ploughfish was first formally described in 1902 by the Belgian-born British ichthyologist George Albert Boulenger with the type locality given as Cape Adare in Antarctica, Boulenger placed this species in a new monotypic genus Gymnodraco, it is still the only known species in that genus. The genus name is a compound of gymnos which means "bare" or "naked", a reference to the almost complete lack of scales on the body, and draco meaning "dragon" and is a common suffix used for notothenioid fish names. The specific name acuticeps means "pointed head" an allusion to the strongly depressed head with its sharply pointed snout.

== Description ==
The ploughfish has a naked body, the only scales being those on the two lateral lines; the middle lateral line has perforated scales, more depressed at the head and compressed towards the tail. The head is triangular in shape with a long, pointed snout. There is a strong ridge on the operculum which forms a spine with a hooked process at its rear end and there is another spine on the suboperculum. In contrast, the preoperculum is smooth. The jaws have canine-like teeth at the mandibular symphysis, with bands of small, slightly decurved conical teeth behind them. The lower jaw protrudes beyond the upper with its front canine-like teeth exposed. There are 27-30 soft rays in the dorsal fin and 23-26 in the anal fin. In alcohol the overall colour of the body is dark brown, becoming paler on the underside. The head is marked with small spots and the body with dark blotches, although these may fade over time. The fins are dark brown to blackish and there is a patch of dark colour around the anus. This species attains a maximum total length of 38.5 cm (15.2 in) and a maximum weight of 86.2 g (3.04 oz).

== Distribution and habitat ==
The ploughfish is native to the Southern Ocean and has been recorded from the Antarctic Peninsula, South Shetland Islands and the continental shelf of Antarctica. It probably has a circum-Antarctic range, though the species has not been recorded from West Antarctica. This is a demersal species, primarily inhabiting benthic zones from the surface down to about 550 m (1,800 ft), although it is rare below 50 m (160 ft). It is often associated with rocky substrates.
