= Dollo's law of irreversibility =

Theory of evolutionary change

Once an organism has evolved in a certain way, it will not return exactly to a previous form. This is illustrated here in two dimensions; in reality, both biomolecules and organisms evolve in many different dimensions.

Dollo's law of irreversibility (also known as Dollo's law and Dollo's principle), proposed in 1893 by Belgian paleontologist Louis Dollo states that, "an organism never returns exactly to a former state, even if it finds itself placed in conditions of existence identical to those in which it has previously lived ... it always keeps some trace of the intermediate stages through which it has passed."

The statement is often misinterpreted as claiming that evolution is not reversible, or that lost structures and organs cannot reappear in the same form by any process of devolution. According to Richard Dawkins, the law is "really just a statement about the statistical improbability of following exactly the same evolutionary trajectory twice (or, indeed, any particular trajectory), in either direction". Stephen Jay Gould suggested that irreversibility forecloses certain evolutionary pathways once broad forms have emerged: "[For example], once you adopt the ordinary body plan of a reptile, hundreds of options are forever closed, and future possibilities must unfold within the limits of inherited design."

This principle is classically applied to morphology, particularly of fossils, but may also be used to describe molecular events, such as individual mutations or gene losses.

== Use in phylogenetics ==
In maximum parsimony, Dollo parsimony refers to a model whereby a characteristic is gained only one time and can never be regained if it is lost. For example, the evolution and repeated loss of teeth in vertebrates could be well-modeled under Dollo parsimony, whereby teeth made from hydroxyapatite evolved only once at the origin of vertebrates, and were then lost multiple times, in birds, turtles, and seahorses, among others.

This also applies to molecular characters, such as losses or inactivation of individual genes themselves. The loss of gulonolactone oxidase, the final enzyme in the biosynthetic pathway of vitamin C, is responsible for the dietary requirement of vitamin C in humans, as well as many other animals.

== A molecular example ==
A 2009 study on the evolution of protein structure proposed a new mechanism for Dollo's law. It examined a hormone receptor that had evolved from an ancestral protein that was able to bind two hormones to a new protein that was specific for a single hormone. This change was produced by two amino acid substitutions, which prevent binding of the second hormone. However, several other changes subsequently occurred, which were selectively neutral as they did not affect hormone binding. When the authors tried to revert the protein to its ancestral state by mutating the two "binding residues", they found the other changes had destabilised the ancestral state of the protein. They concluded that in order for this protein to evolve in reverse and regain its ability to bind two hormones, several independent neutral mutations would have to occur purely by chance with no selection pressure. As this is extremely unlikely, it may explain why evolution tends to run in one direction.

== Proposed exceptions ==
Although the exact threshold for violations of Dollo's law is unclear, there are several case studies whose results dispute the validity of some interpretations. For example, many taxa of gastropods have reduced shells, and some have lost coiling of their shell altogether. In Stephen Jay Gould's interpretation of Dollo's law, it would not be possible to regain a coiled shell after the coiling has been lost. Nevertheless, a few genera in the slipper snail family (Calyptraeidae) may have changed their developmental timing (heterochrony) and regained a coiled shell from a limpet-like shell. Frietson Galis observed that many of these studies are based on either molecular phylogenies or morphological cladistic analyses that are tenuous and subject to change.

Other proposed 'exceptions' include the ocelli and wings of stick insects, the larval stages of salamanders, lost toes and re-evolution of oviparity in lizards, lost lower teeth in frogs, clavicles in non-avian theropod dinosaurs, and neck, pectoral region, and upper limb musculature in primates, including the lineage leading to humans.

== See also ==
- Entropy and life
- Fitness landscape
- Orthogenesis
- Random walk § Biology
