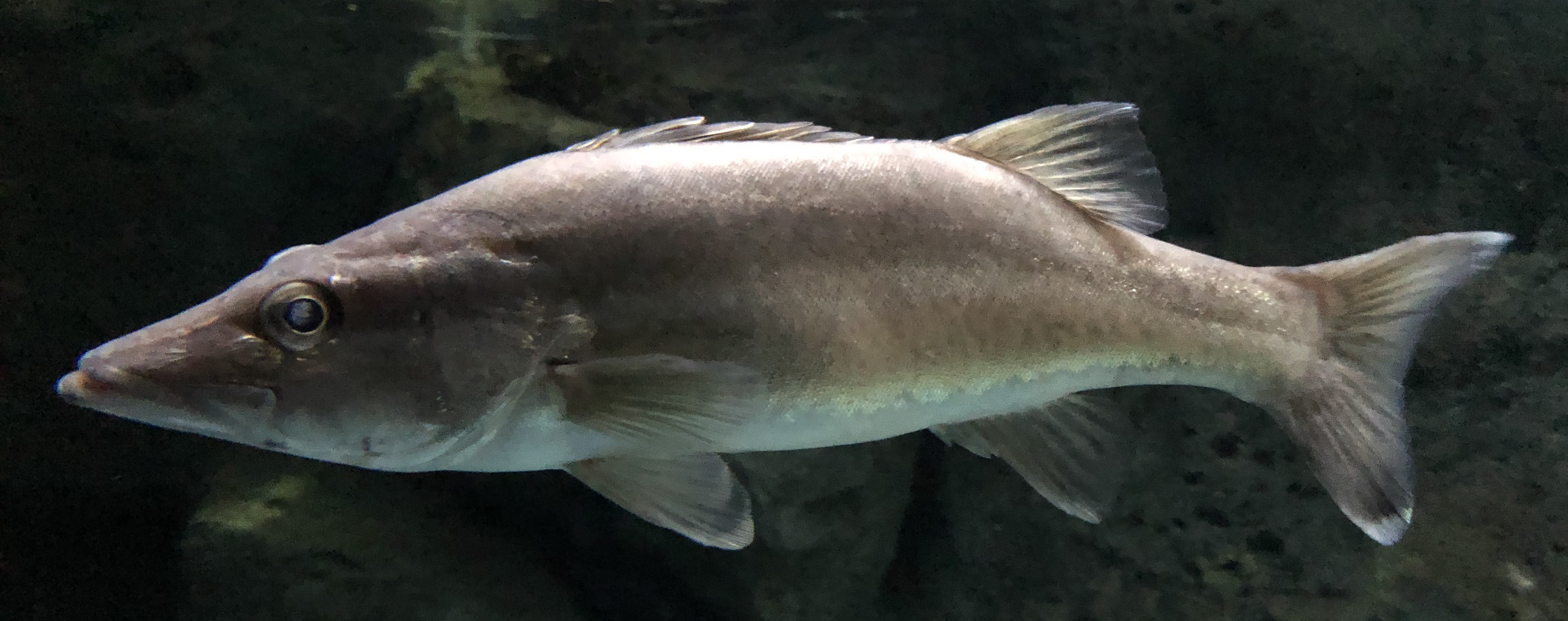

Scientific classification
- Kingdom: Animalia
- Phylum: Chordata
- Class: Actinopterygii
- Order: Perciformes
- Family: Niphonidae; D. S. Jordan, 1923
- Genus: Niphon; Cuvier, 1828
- Species: N. spinosus

Binomial name
- Niphon spinosus Cuvier, 1828

= Ara (fish) =

Species of ray-finned fish

The ara (Niphon spinosus), otherwise known as the saw-edged perch or the Dageumbari (다금바리) is a species of marine ray-finned fish from the monospecific genus Niphon in the monogeneric family Niphonidae. It is found in the Western Pacific Ocean from Japan south to the Philippines where it inhabits rock reefs and inshore waters with rocky sea beds. This species can grow up to 1 metre (3.3 ft) in total length. The ara was first formally described in 1828 by Georges Cuvier in the Histoire naturelle des poissons which he co-authored with Achille Valenciennes, the type locality was given as the Sea of Japan.
