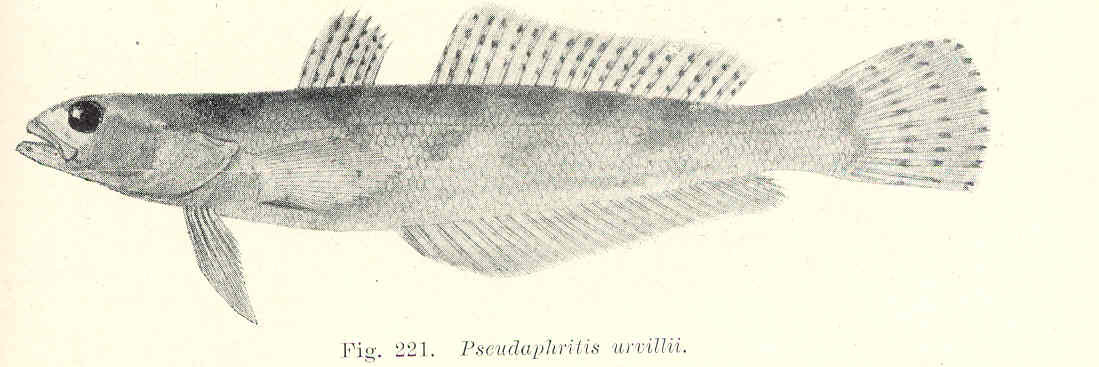
- Waite, Edgar R. (1921). Illustrated Catalogue of the Fishes of South Australia. Freshwater and Marine Image Bank.

Conservation status
- Least Concern (IUCN 3.1)

Scientific classification
- Kingdom: Animalia
- Phylum: Chordata
- Class: Actinopterygii
- Division: Teleostei
- Order: Perciformes
- Suborder: Notothenioidei
- Family: Pseudaphritidae; McCulloch, 1929
- Genus: Pseudaphritis; Castelnau, 1872
- Species: P. urvillii

Binomial name
- Pseudaphritis urvillii (Valenciennes, 1832)

Synonyms
- Aphritis urvillii Valenciennes, 1832; Eleginus bursinus Cuvier, 1830; Pseudaphritis bursinus (Cuvier, 1830)

= Congoli =

Species of fish

The congoli (Pseudaphritis urvillii), also known as the freshwater flathead, marble fish, marbled flathead, sand trout, sanding, sandy, sandy whiting or tupong, is a species of marine ray-finned fish. It is the only species of fish in the monotypic family Pseudaphritidae and the genus Pseudaphritis. It was initially classified as a member of the family Bovichtidae.

== Taxonomy ==
The congoli was first formally described as Aphritis urvillii in 1832 by the French zoologist Achille Valenciennes but the name Aphritis was a junior synonym of the Diptera genus Aphritis named by Pierre André Latreille in 1805. The genus Pseudaphritis was described by the French zoologist Francis de La Porte Castelnau in 1872. The family Pseudaphritidae was first named by the Australian ichthyologist Allan Riverstone McCulloch in 1929. The Pseudaphritidae are the sister family of the Bovichtidae and Eleginopidae and these are all sister to the rest of the families in the Notothenioidei which have been placed in the suggested superfamily Cryonotothenioidea. Pseudaphritidae is one of two families of the suborder Notothenioidei with a primarily non-Antarctic distribution, the other being Bovichtidae. The congoli is the only species in its genus and family.

The genus name Pseudoaphritis is a compound of pseudo which means "false" and aphritis, a name which dates back to Aristotle, who used it for a type of anchovy or whitebait. Valenciennes originally used Aphritis as the name of the genus but this name was unavailable as Pierre Andre Latreille had used it for a fly genus Aphritis in 1804. Lev Berg proposed a replacement name, Phricus but this was a synonym of Castelnau's earlier Pseudaphritis. the specific name honours the explorer Jules Dumont d'Urville, leader of the Astrolabe expedition (1826- 1829), in the course of which type was collected. Gerorges Cuvier's Eleginus bursinus is a senior synonym of Pseudaphritis urvillii but has been disregarded due to the prevailing usage of P. urvillii.

== Distribution and habitat ==
The congolli is found in fresh, brackish and marine waters around south-eastern Australia, including Tasmania, and is endemic to Australia. It lives mostly in slow-moving waters of estuaries, rivers and streams. Water temperatures in its habitat range from 5 to 20 °C (41 to 68 °F). This fish will inhabit areas with log snags, overhanging banks, and leaf litter.

Between late April and August, it migrates south to estuaries and sea to breed.

In 2017, congolli were recorded in five rivers on Kangaroo Island in South Australia for the first time, thanks to a project conducted by Department of Environment, Water and Natural Resources (DEWNR) and carried out by a number of citizen science volunteers.

Tupongs have made a recovery in the Glenelg River in south-western Victoria, after years of absence.

== Description ==
The congolli is a slender, mottled fish, with a silvery-white underside. Its head is slightly flattened, with eyes positioned towards the top and the snout is pointed. It has two separate dorsal fins. The colour varies according to where it lives: it may be bluish, purplish or reddish-brown, marbled with greenish-brown above, and a yellowish white to silvery colour below. Juvenile fish have black saddles on their dorsal surfaces.

The largest adult measured is about 36 centimetres (14 in) long. Usually, adults grow up to 17 centimetres (6.7 in) long.

== Diet ==
The congolli is a carnivorous ambush predator, and feeds on insects (especially in freshwater), fish, crustaceans (especially in estuaries), worms, molluscs, and other invertebrates.

== Behaviour ==
The congolli is an ambush predator that usually buries itself in the substrate.

== Reproduction ==
Congolli are catadromous – they live in freshwater habitats as adults, and migrate downstream to estuaries to spawn. Adults migrate south to estuaries reproduce between late April and August. The larvae are carried out to sea, and slowly move upstream as they grow; the larger adults live furthest upstream.

== Importance to humans ==
Aboriginal peoples living in the area used to eat Congolli, and the flesh is today considered "excellent eating". However the fish are rarely large enough and no longer important in commercial fishing, although once a minor part of lower Murray fisheries.
