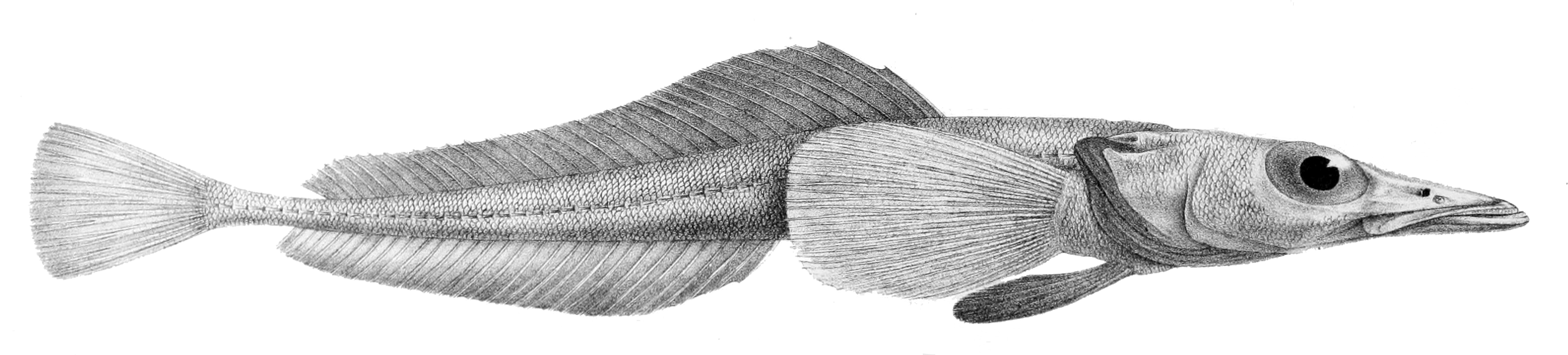
- Bathydraco antarcticus

Scientific classification
- Kingdom: Animalia
- Phylum: Chordata
- Class: Actinopterygii
- Order: Perciformes
- Suborder: Notothenioidei
- Family: Bathydraconidae; Regan, 1913

Genera
- see text

= Bathydraconidae =

Antarctic dragonfishes

Family of fishes

The Bathydraconidae, or the Antarctic dragonfishes, are a family of marine ray-finned fishes, notothenioids belonging to the Perciform suborder Notothenioidei. The family comprises four genera. These fishes are endemic to deep waters off Antarctica.

== Taxonomy ==
Bathydraconidae was first formally described as a family in 1913 by the English ichthyologist Charles Tate Regan in his report on the fishes collected on the Scottish National Antarctic Expedition to the Royal Society of Edinburgh. He used the genus Bathydraco, which had been described by Albert Gunther in 1878 as a monotypic genus with B. antarctica as its type species, as the type genus. Molecular analyses have supported the split of bathydraconids into three clades; Bathydraconinae which includes Bathydraco, Prionodraco and Racovitzia; Gymnodraconinae which includes Gymnodraco, Psilodraco and Acanthodraco); and Cygnodraconinae including Cygnodraco, Gerlachea and Parachaenichthys. However, this subdivision is not recognised in the 5th edition of Fishes of the World. The name of the family is derived from the generic name Bathydraco which is a combination of bathy meaning "deep" and draco meaning dragon, the type of B. antarctica was collected at 2,304 m (7,559 ft) and draco is a commonly used suffix for Notothenioids.

== Genera ==
The following genera are classified within the family Bathydraconidae:

- Acanthodraco Skóra, 1995
- Akarotaxis DeWitt & Hureau, 1980
- Bathydraco Günther, 1878
- Cygnodraco Waite, 1916
- Gerlachea Dollo, 1900
- Gymnodraco Boulenger, 1902
- Parachaenichthys Boulenger, 1902
- Prionodraco Regan, 1914
- Psilodraco Norman. 1937
- Racovitzia Dollo, 1900
- Vomeridens DeWitt & Hureau, 1980

== Characteristics ==
Bathydraconidae species have elongate, slender bodies and may be separated from the other notothenioid families by the lack of a spiny first dorsal fin. Their bodies may be stocky, nearly cylindrical or rather depressed at the front and compressed at the rear. There is a single dorsal fin which has a long base and lacks any spines. The anal fin is typically shorter based than the dorsal fin, again having no spines. The pectoral fins are well developed while the pelvic fins contain 1 spine and 5 branched fin rays, beginning to the front of the pectoral fins. The head is moderate to large in size, being depressed in some species. They have a long snout which is flattened or even slightly depressed and is typically short and pointed. They have large mouths which can extend as far as the level of the middle of the eye. The jaws normally have small, conical teeth and occasionally canines, there are usually no teeth elsewhere in the mouth. They have a single external nostril. The operculum may have a rearwards directed hooked or spine, it may be unarmed. The bodies may have scales, typically ctenoid, bony plates or be naked. They can have 1, 2, 3 or 5 lateral lines made up of tubular, pored or pitted scales, and these are occasionally interlinked.

== Distribution, habitat and biology ==
Bathydraconidae species are benthopelagic fishes found in Antarctic waters. They are not fished commercially and little is known about them. The majority of species in this group occur over the continental shelf and slope of Antarctica, but some have been reported from the Antarctic and sub-Antarctic Islands. They inhabit from shallow, inshore waters, although some have been found as deep as 3,000 m (9,800 ft). One species, Gymnodraco acuticeps, has been found in McMurdo Sound living at shallow depths under sea ice, this species may even live under the Ross Ice Shelf.
