= Louis Dollo =

Belgian paleontologist (1857–1931)

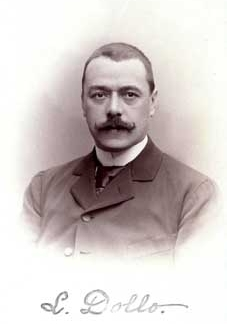
- Louis Dollo
- Born: 7 December 1857; Lille, France
- Died: 19 April 1931 (aged 73); Brussels, Belgium
- Citizenship: French
- Known for: Dollo's law
- Awards: Murchison Medal (1912)
- Scientific career
- Fields: palaeontology

Louis Antoine Marie Joseph Dollo (French pronunciation: [lwi ɑ̃twan maʁi ʒozɛf dɔlo]; 7 December 1857 – 19 April 1931) was a Belgian palaeontologist, known for his work on dinosaurs. He also posited that evolution is not reversible, known as Dollo's law. Together with the Austrian Othenio Abel, Dollo established the principles of paleobiology.

== Early life ==
Louis Dollo was born in Lille, Nord-Pas-de-Calais, a scion of an old Breton family. He studied at the École centrale de Lille, with geologist Jules Gosselet and zoologist Alfred Giard, both of whom influenced the young Dollo. In 1877, he graduated with a degree in engineering. After his graduation, he worked in the mining industry for five years, but simultaneously developed a passion for paleontology. In 1879, he moved to Brussels.

== Iguanodon spp. ==
For three years, starting in 1878, he supervised the excavation of the famous, multiple Iguanodon find at Bernissart, Belgium. He devoted himself to their study as a scientific passion, initially concurrently with his engineering career. In 1882 he became an assistant naturalist at the Royal Belgian Institute of Natural Sciences. Dollo was given membership in the Société des sciences de Lille and the Geological Society of London.

From 1882 to 1885, while he was head of the vertebrate fossil section of the Royal Institute, Dollo worked on reconstructing the skeletons of the iguanodons, as it was necessary to display them on their hind legs. The first one was assembled in the interior of an unused church that Dollo was using as a workshop. Twelve of those skeletons have been the principal attraction of the Museum of Natural Sciences at the Royal Institute. Dollo collaborated with his former professor Alfred Giard and the Université Lille Nord de France.

== Dollo's law ==
Around 1890, he formulated a hypothesis on the irreversible nature of evolution, known later as "Dollo's law". According to his hypothesis, a structure or organ lost during the course of evolution would not reappear in that organism. This hypothesis was largely accepted until Michael F. Whiting's 2003 discovery that certain insects that had lost their wings regained them millions of years later. However, it was redeemed on the molecular level in 2009 as a result of a study on glucocorticoid receptors.

== Paleobiology ==
Dollo continued his work with fossils, in addition to studies of dinosaurs and their ecology. He was among the first to see fossil animals as part of an ecosystem. Because of that, he was instrumental in the development of paleobiology, and he kept up an extensive correspondence with Othenio Abel, another famous early paleobiologist.

He taught paleontology at the Free University of Brussels, beginning in 1909, and in 1912 received the Murchison Medal. Recently, the stochastic Dollo model is being used to analyze matrix of cognates statistically. In linguistics, this model permits a newly coined cognate to arise only once on a tree language.

== Works ==
=== Animal classifications ===
- Hypsilophodontidae, 1882
- Boulengerina, 1886
- Cryptodira: Eurysternidae, 1886
- Iguanodontia: Iguanodon bernissartensis, 1888
- Iguanodontia: Iguanodon mantelli, 1888
- Prognathodon, 1889
- Bathydraconidae Gerlachea australis, 1900
- Bathydraconidae Racovitzia glacialis, 1900
- Bathydraconidae, 1906
- Macrourinae: Cynomacrurus, 1909
- Elapidae
- Dyrosauridae

=== Literature ===
- Dollo, Louis (1882). "Première note sur les dinosauriens de Bernissart". Bulletin du Musée Royal d'Histoire Naturelle de Belgique. 1: 161–180.
- Dollo, Louis (1883). "Note sur les restes de dinosauriens rencontrés dans le Crétacé Supérieur de la Belgique". Bulletin du Musée Royal d'Histoire Naturelle de Belgique. 2: 205–221.
- Louis Dollo (1891), "La vie au sein des mers : la faune marine et les grandes profondeurs, les grandes explorations sous marines, les conditions d'existence dans les abysses, la faune abyssale", in: Bibliothèque scientifique contemporaine.
- Louis Dollo (1892), "Sur le "Lepidosteus suessoniensis", in: Bulletin scientifique de la France et de la Belgique.
- Louis Dollo (1892), "Sur la morphologie des côtes", in: Bulletin scientifique de la France et de la Belgique.
- Louis Dollo (1892), "Sur la morphologie de la colonne vertébrale", in: Bulletin scientifique de la France et de la Belgique.
- Louis Dollo (1899), "Première note sur les mosasauriens de Maestricht", Bulletine. Soc. belge Geol. Pal. Hydr., Vol.4.
- Louis Dollo (1899), Alfred Giard, "Les ancêtres des Marsupiaux étaient-ils arboricoles ?", Station Zoologique de Wimereux.
- Louis Dollo (1903), "Les Ancêtres des mosasauriens", in: Bulletin scientifique de la France et de la Belgique.
- Louis Dollo (1904), Expédition antarctique belge (1897–1899); résultats du voyage du S. Y. Belgica en 1897 – 1898 – 1899 sous le commandement de A. de Gerlache de Gomery; rapports scientifiques : Zoologie : Poissons. Antwerp: J.-E. Buschmann.
- Dollo, Louis (1905). "Les Dinosauriens adaptés à la vie quadrupède secondaire". Bulletine. Soc. belge Geol. Pal. Hydr. 19: 441–448.
- Louis Dollo (1910), La Paléontologie éthologique.

Translations by Louis Dollo

- John Tyndall, Les Microbes (1882)
- Rudolf Hörnes, Manuel de paléontologie (1886)
- Wilhelm Krause, Manuel d'anatomie humaine (1887–89)

Re-published works by Louis Dollo

- Stephen Jay Gould (1970), "Dollo on Dollo's Law: Irreversibility and the Status of Evolutionary Laws", Journal of the History of Biology / 3, No.2:189–212.
- Stephen Jay Gould, ed. (1980), Louis Dollo's papers on paleontology and evolution, Original Anthology, New York, Arno Press, 1980
- David B. Weishampel and Nadine M. White, eds. (2003) The Dinosaur Papers, Washington: Smithsonian Institution Books.
- Drinker Cope, Edward (1886). "Schlosser on Creodonta and Phenacodus; Dollo on extinct tortoises". American Naturalist. 20: 965–968.

=== Biographies of Dollo ===
- Abel, Othenio (1931). "Louis Dollo. 7 Dezember 1857–19 April 1931. Ein Rückblick und Abschied". Palaeobiologica. 4: 321–344.
- Victor Émile van Straelen, Louis Dollo : Notice biographique avec liste bibliographique. Bruxelles (1933).
- N. N. Yakovlev, "Memoirs about Louis Dollo," Ezhegodn. Vsesoyuzn. Paleontol. O-va 10, 4–9 (1935).
- P. Brien, "Notice sur Louis Dollo," Ann. Acad. R. Belg. Not. Biograph. 1, 69–138 (1951).
- L. Sh. Davitashvili, "Louis Dollo," in Questions of the History of Sciences and Engineering, Vol. 3. pp. 103–108 (Moscow, 1957) [in Russian].
- N. N. Yakovlev, Memoirs of a Geologist Paleontologist (Nauka, Moscow, 1965) [in Russian].
- L. K. Gabunia, "Dollo Louis Antone Marie Joseph," in Dictionary of Scientific Biography (New York), Vol. 4, pp. 147–148 (1971)
- L. K. Gabunia, Louis Dollo (1857–1931) (Nauka, Moscow, 1974) [in Russian].
- Yu. Ya. Soloviev, Louis Dollo, Paleontologicheskii Zhurnal, 2008, No. 6, pp. 103–107 [in Russian].
- Yu. Ya. Soloviev, 150th Anniversary of the birth of Louis Dollo (1857–1931), Paleontological Journal Volume 42, Issue 6, pp 681–684, October 2008.
