= Hugh Hamilton DeWitt =

American ichthyologist, marine biologist and oceanographer

- Born: Hugh Hamilton Seligman; December 28, 1933; San Jose, California
- Died: January 5, 1995 (aged 61); Orono, Maine
- Education: Stanford University
- Scientific career
- Fields: Ichthyologist, marine biologist, oceanographer
- Workplaces: University of South Florida; University of Maine
- Doctoral advisor: George Sprague Myers

Hugh Hamilton DeWitt (28 December 1933 – 5 January 1995) was an American ichthyologist, marine biologist and oceanographer.

== Early life and education ==
DeWitt was born on 28 December 1933 in San Jose, California, son of Carl Bryce Seligman, a country doctor, and Honor Pettit Seligman, a teacher of mathematics and Latin. His surname at birth was Seligman but at his father's urging he and his brothers changed their name to DeWitt in the 1950s, a name from their mother's side of the family, as they had encountered mistaken preconceptions while attending High Schools in the eastern United States. His brothers were the theoretical physicist Bryce Seligman DeWitt, Lloyd Lewis DeWitt (1926-1988), who joined the United States Foreign Service and Hiram Pettit DeWitt (b.1936), a teacher. He grew up largely in California, leaving to attend high school at the Putney School in Vermont. He returned to California to enrol at Stanford University, gaining his bachelor's degree in 1955, masters in 1960 and doctorate in 1966, the doctoral thesis being on the cod icefishes of the genus Notothenia. He was one of the last graduate students to be supervised by George Sprague Myers.

== Career ==
He held teaching, research assistant and associate positions at Stanford before taking on the role of assistant professor of marine science at the University of South Florida. In 1969 he became a member of the faculty at the University of Maine in Orono, Maine where he was eventually appointed as professor of Zoology and Oceanography.

DeWitt was known internationally as an ichthyologist, marine biologist and oceanographer with a special interest in the taxonomy, functional morphology, biogeography and ecology of fishes, particularly the species which inhabited the frigid waters of the Southern Ocean. He was one of the leading workers studying the fishes found on the Antarctic continental shelf. He first worked in the Arctic in 1958 as a project assistant while still studying at Stanford University. In 1975 he was the chief scientist on the Argentine naval research vessel ARA Islas Orcadas and he was frequently invited to participate in other cruises as his technical expertise was highly regarded. Between 1974 and 1980 he was publications secretary for the American Society of Ichthyologists and Herpetologists. He named a number of species, particularly from Antarctica and was a major contributor to the book Fishes of the Southern Ocean. He died in his office at the University of Maine on 5 January 1995.

== Personal life ==
DeWitt was married twice and had three daughters from his first marriage to Joanne Rice who he married in 1956, this ended in divorce and Dewitt remarried Jane Siple DeWitt, gaining two stepchildren. His leisure was time taken up with mountain climbing, jogging and hiking as well as listening to Baroque Music, Classical Music and Gilbert & Sullivan.

== Honoraria ==
In 1964, DeWitt had a mountain named after him, the 2,203 m (7,228 ft) Mount DeWitt in south Victoria Land in Antarctica.

=== Taxa named in his honor ===
He was also honored in having a number of fish species named after him.

- The snailfish Paraliparis dewitti,
- The notothen Paranotothenia dewitti,
- The barbled plunderfish Pogonophryne dewitti,
- The Antarctic dragonfish Acanthodraco dewitti
- The crocodile icefish Chionobathyscus dewitti.

He died in 1995 at his office at the University of Maine in Orono, Maine.
