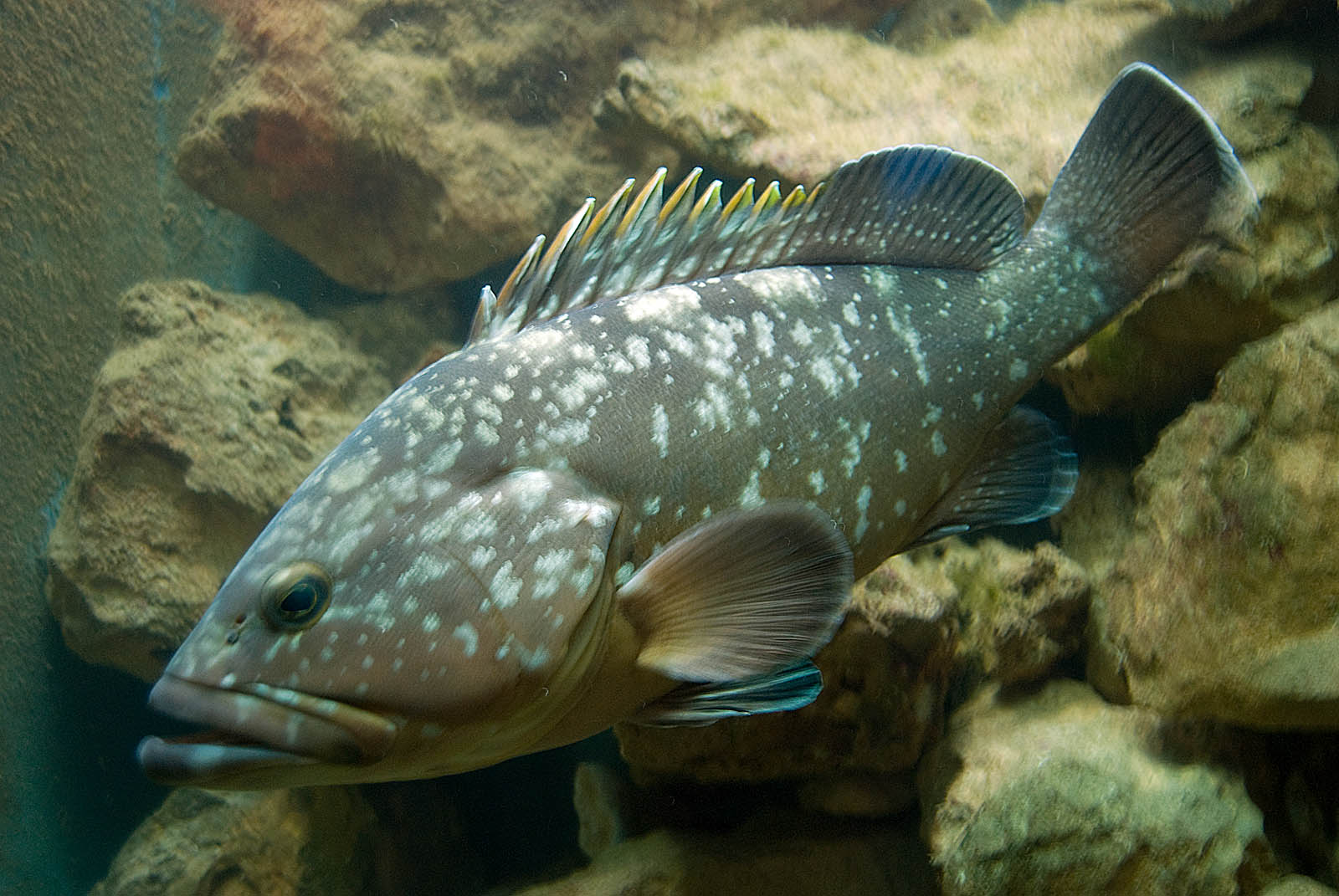

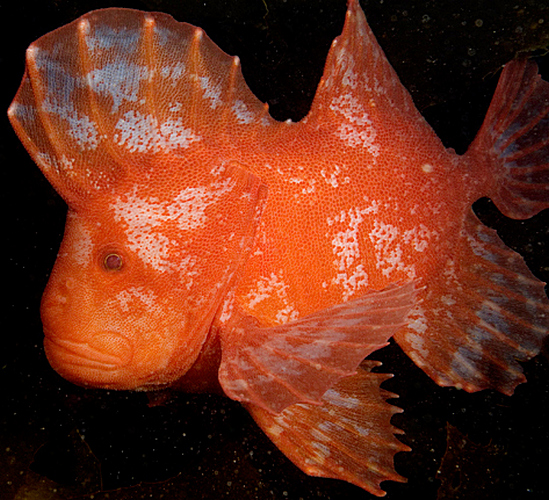
- Top: Dusky grouper (Epinephelus marginatus); Bottom: Red velvetfish (Gnathanacanthus goetzeei)

Scientific classification
- Kingdom: Animalia
- Phylum: Chordata
- Class: Actinopterygii
- Division: Teleostei
- Clade: Eupercaria
- Order: Perciformes; Bleeker, 1863

Type species
- Perca fluviatilis Linnaeus, 1758

Suborders
- Percoidei; Notothenioidei; Scorpaenoidei; Cottoidei; Gasterosteoidei; Zoarcoidei

= Perciformes =

Perciformes Temporal range: Early Paleocene to present

Order of ray-finned fishes

Perciformes (/ˈpɜːrsɪˌfɔːrmiːz/), is an order of ray-finned fish in the clade Percomorpha. Perciformes means "perch-like". Among the well-known members of this group are perches and darters (Percidae), and also sea basses (Serranidae). This order contains many familiar freshwater temperate and tropical marine fish groups, but also extremophiles that have successfully colonized both the North and South Poles, as well as the deepest depths of the ocean.

== Taxonomy ==
Formerly, this group was thought to be even more diverse than it is thought to be now, containing about 41% of all bony fish (about 10,000 species) and about 160 families, which is the most of any order within the vertebrates. However, many of these other families have since been reclassified within their own orders within the clade Percomorpha, significantly reducing the size of the group. In contrast to this splitting, other groups formerly considered distinct, such as the Scorpaeniformes, are now classified in the Perciformes.

=== Evolution ===
The earliest fossil perciform is the extinct stem group-perciform Paleoserranus (originally considered an early serranid) from the Early Paleocene of Mexico, but potential records of "percoids" are known from the Maastrichtian, including Eoserranus and Prolates, although their exact taxonomic identity remains uncertain. The earliest crown-group perciform fossils are known from the Early Eocene, including the scorpaenoid Eosynanceja and platycephalid otoliths from New Zealand.

=== Classification ===
Classification of this group has long been controversial, with various families being placed in and out of Perciformes depending on the study. Only in recent decades, with the advent of molecular phylogenetics, has the classification of the family been largely resolved. Based on these studies, many suborders formerly placed within the Perciformes are better placed elsewhere in the Percomorpha, but former members of the Scorpaeniformes, Gasterosteiformes, and some members of the Trachiniformes (including the type genus) are now considered true perciforms.

==== Present classification ====
The following classification is based on Eschmeyer's Catalog of Fishes:

- Order Perciformes
  - Genus †Paleoserranus Cantalice, Alvarado-Ortega & Alaniz-Galvan, 2018
  - Suborder Percoidei
    - Family Serranidae Swainson, 1839 (sea basses)
    - Family Anthiadidae Poey, 1861 (fairy basslets or streamer basses)
    - Family Epinephelidae Bleeker, 1874 (groupers)
    - Family Liopropomatidae Poey, 1867 (painted basslets)
    - Family Grammistidae Bleeker, 1857 (soapfishes)
    - Family Percidae Rafinesque, 1815 (perches and darters)
    - Family Niphonidae Jordan, 1923 (Ara groupers)
    - Family Trachinidae Rafinesque, 1815 (weeverfishes)
    - Family Bembropidae Regan, 1913 (flatheads or duckbill flatheads)
  - Suborder Notothenioidei
    - Family Percophidae Swainson, 1839 (Brazilian flatheads)
    - Family Bovichtidae Gill, 1862 (thornfishes)
    - Family Pseudaphritidae McCulloch, 1929 (congollis)
    - Family Eleginopidae Gill, 1893 (Patagonian blennies)
    - Family Nototheniidae Günther, 1861 (cod icefishes)
    - Family Harpagiferidae Gill, 1861 (plunderfishes)
    - Family Bathydraconidae Regan, 1913 (Antarctic dragonfishes)
    - Family Channichthyidae Gill, 1861 (crocodile icefishes)
  - Suborder Scorpaenoidei
    - Family Platycephalidae Swainson, 1839 (flatheads)
    - Family Hoplichthyidae Kaup, 1873 (spiny flatheads)
    - Family Triglidae Rafinesque, 1815 (searobins)
    - Family Bembridae Kaup, 1873 (deepwater flatheads)
    - Family Synanceiidae Swainson, 1839 (stonefishes)
    - Family Neosebastidae Matsubara, 1943 (gurnard scorpionfishes)
    - Family Plectrogeniidae Fowler, 1938 (stinger flatheads)
    - Family Scorpaenidae Risso, 1827 (scorpionfishes)
    - Family Congiopodidae Gill, 1889 (racehorses or pigfishes)
    - Family Zanclorhynchidae Andriashev, 1993 (horsefishes)
    - Family Normanichthyidae Clark, 1937 (barehead scorpionfishes )
  - Suborder Cottoidei
    - Family Anoplopomatidae Jordan & Gilbert ,1883 (sablefishes)
    - Family Zaniolepididae Jordan & Gilbert, 1883 (combfishes)
    - Family Hexagrammidae Jordan, 1888 (greenlings)
    - Family Rhamphocottidae Jordan & Gilbert, 1883 (horsehead sculpins)
    - Family Jordaniidae Jordan & Evermann, 1898 (longfin sculpins)
    - Family Cottidae Bonaparte, 1831 (sculpins)
    - Family Psychrolutidae Günther, 1861 (marine sculpins)
    - Family Nautichthyidae Taranetz, 1941 (sailfin sculpins)
    - Family Hemilepidotidae Jordan & Evermann, 1898 (Irish lords)
    - Family Hemitripteridae Gill, 1865 (sea ravens)
    - Family Agonidae Swainson, 1839 (poachers)
    - Family Trichodontidae Bleeker, 1859 (sandfishes)
    - Family Cyclopteridae Bonaparte, 1831 (lumpfishes)
    - Family Liparidae Gill, 1861 (snailfishes)
  - Suborder Gasterosteoidei
    - Family Hypoptychidae Steindachner, 1880 (sand-eels)
    - Family Gasterosteidae Bonaparte, 1831 (sticklebacks)
    - Family Aulorhynchidae Gill, 1861 (tubesnouts)
  - Suborder Zoarcoidei
    - Family Bathymasteridae Jordan & Gilbert, 1883 (ronquils)
    - Family Cebidichthyidae Gill, 1862 (monkeyface pricklebacks)
    - Family Stichaeidae Gill, 1864 (pricklebacks)
    - Family Scytalinidae Jordan & Starks, 1895 (graveldivers)
    - Family Opisthocentridae Jordan & Evermann, 1898 (rearspined fin pricklebacks)
    - Family Ptilichthyidae Jordan & Gilbert, 1883 (quillfishes)
    - Family Pholidae Gill, 1893 (gunnels)
    - Family Zaproridae Jordan, 1896 (prowfishes)
    - Family Cryptacanthodidae Gill, 1861 (wrymouths)
    - Family Lumpenidae Jordan & Evermann, 1898 (eel pricklebacks)
    - Family Eulophiidae Smith, 1902 (spinous eelpouts)
    - Family Neozoarcidae Jordan & Snyder, 1902 (largemouth kissing eelpouts)
    - Family Anarhichadidae Bonaparte, 1835 (wolffishes)
    - Family Zoarcidae Swainson, 1839 (eelpouts)

The following fossil families may also belong to Perciformes sensu stricto, although this is uncertain:

- ?Family †Callipterygidae Jordan, 1905
- ?Family †Eocottidae Bannikov, 2004
- ?Family †Robertanniidae Bannikov, 2011
- Family †Trispinachidae Nazarkin, 2002

==== Past classifications ====
As traditionally defined before the introduction of cladistics, the Perciformes are almost certainly paraphyletic. These are grouped by suborder/superfamily, generally following the text Fishes of the World.

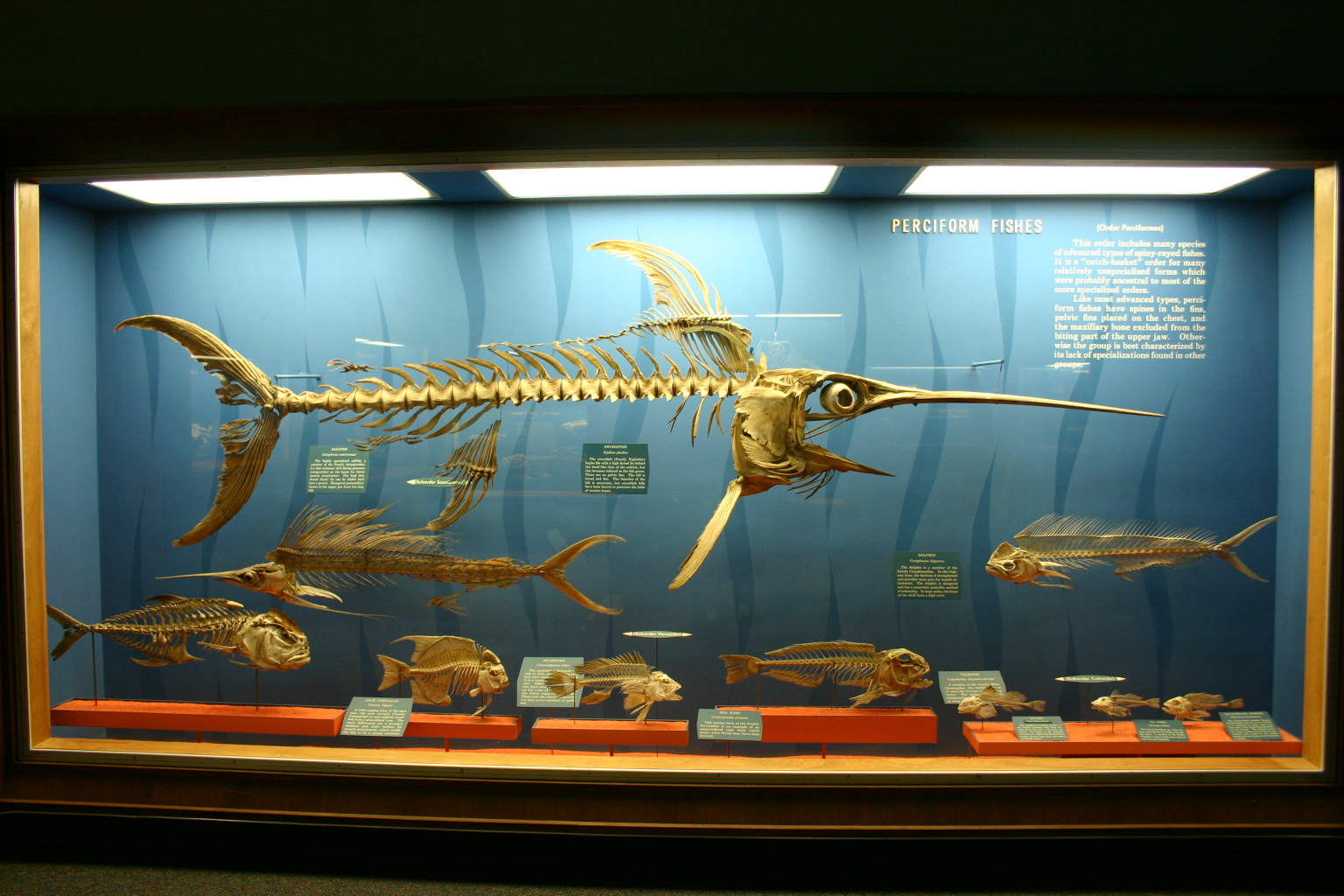
Perciformes display at the National Museum of Natural History.

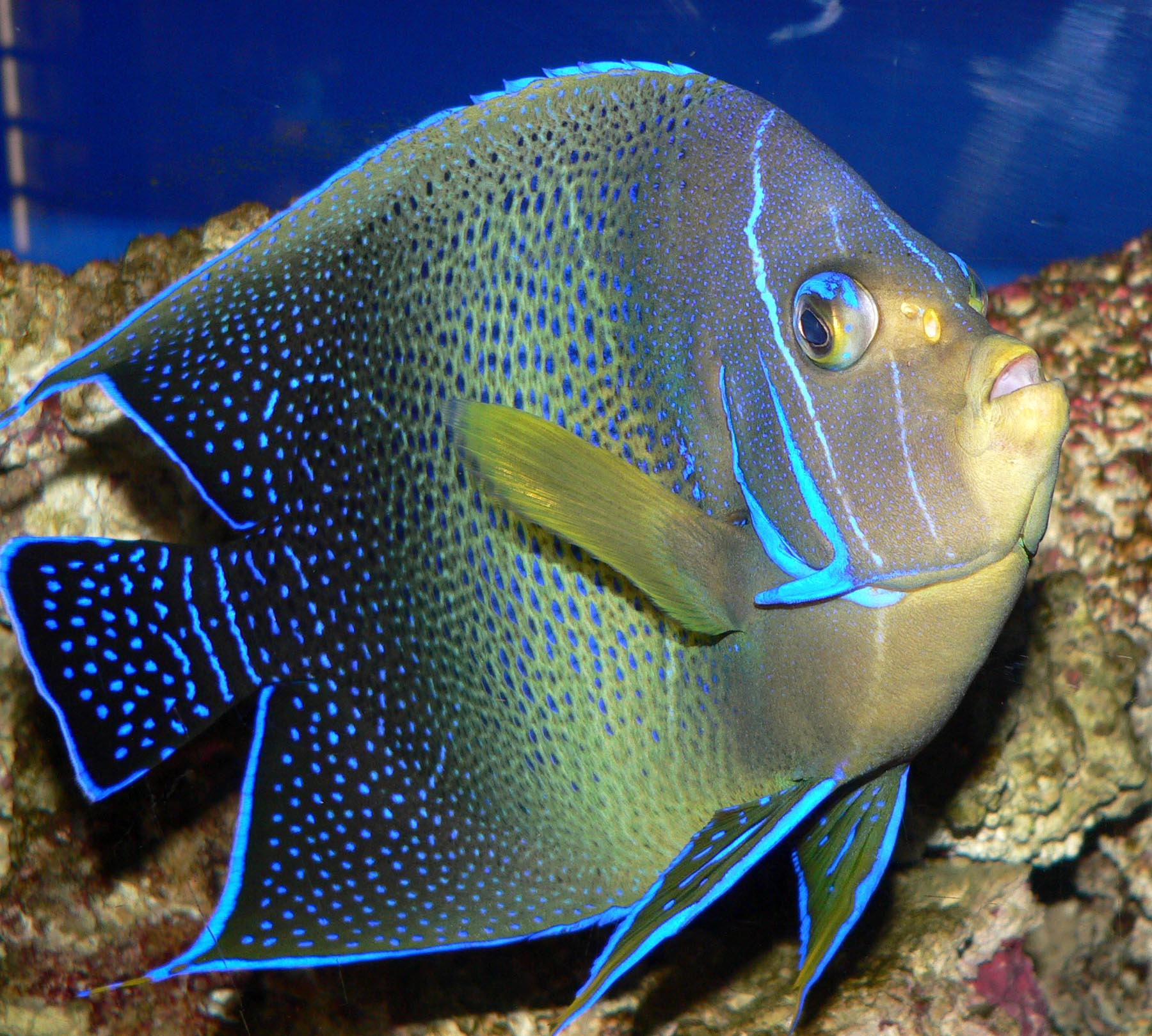
Pomacanthus semicirculatus

Nelson 2016	Betancur-Rodriguez et al. 2017
Suborder Percoidei; Superfamily Percoidea; Centropomidae (Snooks); Latidae (Lates); Gerreidae (Mojarras); Centrogenyidae (False scorpionfishes); Perciliidae (Southern basses); Howellidae (Oceanic basslets); Acropomatidae (Lanternbellies); Epigonidae (Deepwater cardinalfishes); Polyprionidae (Wreckfishes); Lateolabracidae (Asian sea-basses); Mullidae (Goatfishes); Glaucosomatidae (Pearl perches); Pempheridae (Sweepers); Oplegnathidae (Knifejaws); Kuhliidae (Flagtails); Bathyclupeidae (Bathyclupeids); Toxotidae (Archerfishes); Arripidae (Australasian salmon (kahawai)); Dichistiidae (Galjoen fishes); Kyphosidae (Sea chubs); Terapontidae (grunters or tigerperches); Percichthyidae (temperate perches); Sinipercidae (Chinese perches); Enoplosidae (Oldwives); Pentacerotidae (Armourheads); Dinopercidae (Cavebasses); Banjosiidae (Banjofishes); Centrarchidae (Sunfishes); Serranidae (Sea basses and Groupers); Percidae (Perches); Lactariidae (False trevallies); Dinolestidae (Long-finned pikes); Scombropidae (Gnomefishes); Pomatomidae (Bluefishes); Bramidae (Pomfrets); Caristiidae (Manefishes); Possibly related to Acanthuriformes; Monodactylidae (Moonfishes); Priacanthidae (Bigeyes (catalufas)); Families which may have a relationship to Acanthuroidei, Monodactylidae, and Priacanthidae; Leiognathidae (Ponyfishes, slimys, or slipmouths); Chaetodontidae (Butterflyfishes); Pomacanthidae (Angelfishes); Malacanthidae (Tilefishes); Haemulidae (Grunts); Hapalogenyidae (Barbeled grunters); Lutjanidae (Snappers); Caesionidae (Fusiliers); Superfamily Cirrhitoidea; Cirrhitidae (Hawkfishes); Chironemidae (Kelpfishes); Aplodactylidae (Marblefishes); Cheilodactylidae (Morwongs); Latridae (Trumpeters); Superfamily Cepoloidea; Cepolidae (Bandfishes); Superfamily Siganoidea; Scatophagidae (Scats); Siganidae (Rabbitfishes); Suborder Notothenioidei; Bovichtidae (Temperate icefishes); Pseudaphritidae (Catadromous icefishes); Eleginopsidae (Patagonian blennies); Nototheniidae (Cod icefishes); Harpagiferidae (Spiny plunderfishes); Artedidraconidae (Barbeled plunderfishes); Bathydraconidae (Antarctic dragonfishes); Channichthyidae (Crocodile icefishes)	Order Perciformes (incl. Gasterosteiformes; Scorpaeniformes); Suborder Serranoidei; Serranidae; Suborder Percoidei; Trachinidae; Niphonidae; Percidae; Suborder Normanichthyoidei; Normanichthyidae; Suborder Notothenioidei; Artedidraconidae; Bathydraconidae; Bovichtidae; Channichthyidae; Eleginopsidae; Harpagiferidae; Nototheniidae; Percophidae; Pseudaphritidae; Suborder Platycephaloidei; Hoplichthyidae; Bembridae; Parabembridae; Platycephalidae; Plectrogeniidae; Suborder Bembropoidei; Bembropidae; Suborder Triglioidei; Peristediidae; Triglidae; Suborder Scorpaenoidei; Apistidae; Aploactinidae; Congiopodidae; Eschmeyeridae; Gnathanacanthidae; Neosebastidae; Pataecidae; Perryenidae; Synanceiidae; Tetrarogidae; Scorpaenidae (incl. Caracanthidae); Sebastidae; Setarchidae; Zanclorhynchidae; Suborder Cottoidei; Infraorder Anoplopomatales; Anoplopomatidae; Infraorder Zoarcales; Anarhichadidae; Bathymasteridae; Cryptacanthodidae; Eulophiidae; Zoarcidae; Pholidae; Ptilichthyidae; Zaproridae; Stichaeidae; Scytalinidae; Infraorder Gasterosteales; Hypoptychidae; Aulorhynchidae; Gasterosteidae; Infraorder Zaniolepidales; Zaniolepididae; Infraorder Hexagrammales; Hexagrammidae; Infraorder Cottales; Normanichthyidae; Trichodontidae; Cyclopteridae; Liparidae; Jordaniidae; Rhamphocottidae (Ereuniidae); Scorpaenichthyidae; Agonidae (incl. Hemitripteridae); Cottidae (incl. Abyssocottidae, Comephoridae; Cottocomephoridae); Psychrolutidae (incl. Bathylutichthyidae)

=== Phylogeny ===
Cladogram from Near & Thacker, 2024:

- pan‑perciforms
  - †Paleoserranus
  - Perciformes
    - - Anthiadidae
      - Epinephelidae
    - - Acanthistius
      - - - - Bembropidae
            - Serranidae
          - Percoidei
            - Trachinidae
            - - Niphon spinosus
              - Percidae
        - - Notothenioidei
            - Percophis brasiliensis
            - - Bovichtidae
              - - Pseudaphritis urvillii
                - - - pan‑eleginopids
                      - †Proeleginops
                      - Eleginops maclovinus
                  - - Pleuragramma antarcticum
                    - Trematominae
                    - - Aethotaxis mitopteryx
                      - Dissostichus
                      - Gvozdarus
                    - - Gobionotothen
                      - - Nototheniidae
                        - - Harpagiferidae
                          - - Bathydraconidae
                            - Channichthyidae
          - Scorpaenoidei
            - Platycephalidae
            - - - Scorpaenoidea
                  - - Hoplichthys
                    - Normanichthys crockeri
                  - - - Neosebastidae
                      - Plectrogeniidae
                    - - Congiopodidae
                      - - Scorpaenidae
                        - Synanceiidae
              - - Bembridae
                - - Triglidae
                  - - Anoplopomatidae
                    - - - Cottoidea
                          - - - Jordaniidae
                              - Rhamphocottidae
                            - - - Agonidae
                                - Scorpaenichthys marmoratus
                              - - Cottidae
                                - Psychrolutidae
                          - - Zaniolepididae
                            - - - pan‑hexagrammids
                                  - †Sakhalinia
                                  - - †Paraophiodon
                                    - Hexagrammidae
                              - - Trichodontidae
                                - - Cyclopteridae
                                  - Liparidae
                      - - Gasterosteidae
                        - Zoarcoidea
                          - Bathymasteridae
                          - Eulophiidae
                          - - Cebidichthyidae
                            - - Stichaeidae
                              - - - Cryptacanthodes
                                  - Lumpenidae
                                - - - Neozoarcidae
                                    - - Anarhichadidae
                                      - Zoarcidae
                                  - - Zaprora silenus
                                    - - Opisthocentridae
                                      - - Ptilichthys goodei
                                        - - †Agnevichthys
                                          - - †Palaeopholis
                                            - Pholidae

== Characteristics ==
The dorsal and anal fins are divided into anterior spiny and posterior soft-rayed portions, which may be partially or completely separated. The pelvic fins usually have one spine and up to five soft rays, positioned unusually far forward under the chin or under the belly. Scales are usually ctenoid (rough to the touch), although sometimes they are cycloid (smooth to the touch) or otherwise modified.
