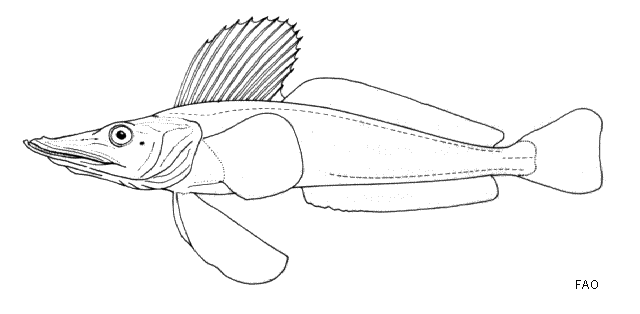
- Drawing by J.C. Hureau

Scientific classification
- Kingdom: Animalia
- Phylum: Chordata
- Class: Actinopterygii
- Order: Perciformes
- Family: Channichthyidae
- Genus: Neopagetopsis; Nybelin, 1947
- Species: N. ionah

Binomial name
- Neopagetopsis ionah Nybelin, 1947

= Jonah's icefish =

Species of fish

Jonah's icefish (Neopagetopsis ionah) is a benthopelagic species of marine ray-finned fish belonging to the family Channichthyidae, the crocodile icefishes. It is the only member of the monotypic genus Neopagetopsis. It is found in the Southern Ocean at depths of from 20 to 900 metres (66 to 2,953 ft). It has a circum-Antarctic distribution on the continental slope and continental shelf, with the northernmost records from the South Shetland and the South Orkney Islands.

== Taxonomy ==
Jonah's icefish was first formally described in 1947 by the Swedish ichthyologist Orvar Nybelin with the type locality given as near the Balleny Islands, Ross Dependency in Antarctica. It is the only species in the genus Neopagetopsis. The genus name is a compound of neo which means "new"; and Pagetopsis, the name of a related genus to which this taxon bears a resemblance, but differs by having long pelvic fins and three lateral lines. The specific name refers to the Biblical prophet Jonah and is an allusion to the type being collected from the stomach of a whale.

== Description ==
Jonah's icefish has a forward curving spine on the snout. There are 3–4 radiating ridges on the operculum, each ending at its rear with a spine; none of the other opercular bones have spines. The three lateral lines do not have any bony plates. The first and second dorsal fins are continuous. The dorsal fins hold 14–15 spines and 32–35 soft rays while the anal fin contains 29–32 soft rays. The well-developed first dorsal fins and fan-shaped pelvic fins are blackish while the other fins may be dusky or blackish in color. The overall color is a dark blackish-green or black on the body, although the belly is whitish; those of juveniles may have irregular dark markings present. This species attain a maximum total length of 56 cm (22 in).

== Distribution and habitat ==
Jonah's icefish is found in the Southern Ocean where it is circum-Antarctic on the continental shelf and slope, with the northernmost reports coming from the South Shetland and South Orkney Islands. It is a benthopelagic species which occurs at depths between 20 and 900 m (66 and 2,953 ft). In January 2014 the first nesting Jonah's icefish records were made, and in February 2021 a larger colony estimated to be composed of approximately 60 million Jonah's icefish was found, both colonies were discovered inhabiting the Filchner Trough in the southern Weddell Sea, off the coast of Antarctica between 420 to 535 metres (1,378 to 1,755 ft). It is estimated that the colony discovered in 2021 covers at least 240 square kilometres (93 sq mi), with an average of one nest every 3.85 square metres (41.4 sq ft) and a total biomass of 60,000 tonnes (132,000,000 lb) of fish.

== Biology ==
Jonah's icefish mainly feeds on fish, such as Dacodraco hunteri, Chaenodraco wilsoni, Pleuragramma antarcticum and Chionodraco sp., as well as krill, as adults. Young specimens, however, feed mainly on krill, especially Euphausia superba, and they are frequently caught along with their prey at 10 to 15 cm (3.9 to 5.9 in) total length. In the South Shetland Islands, both adults and juveniles show a marked preference for krill (only 3 out of 19 sampled specimens had consumed any kind of fish). This species has a more complete hemoglobin gene than other species of crocodile icefish; however, it is still nonfunctional.

== Fisheries ==
Jonah's icefish is of no interest to commercial fisheries.
