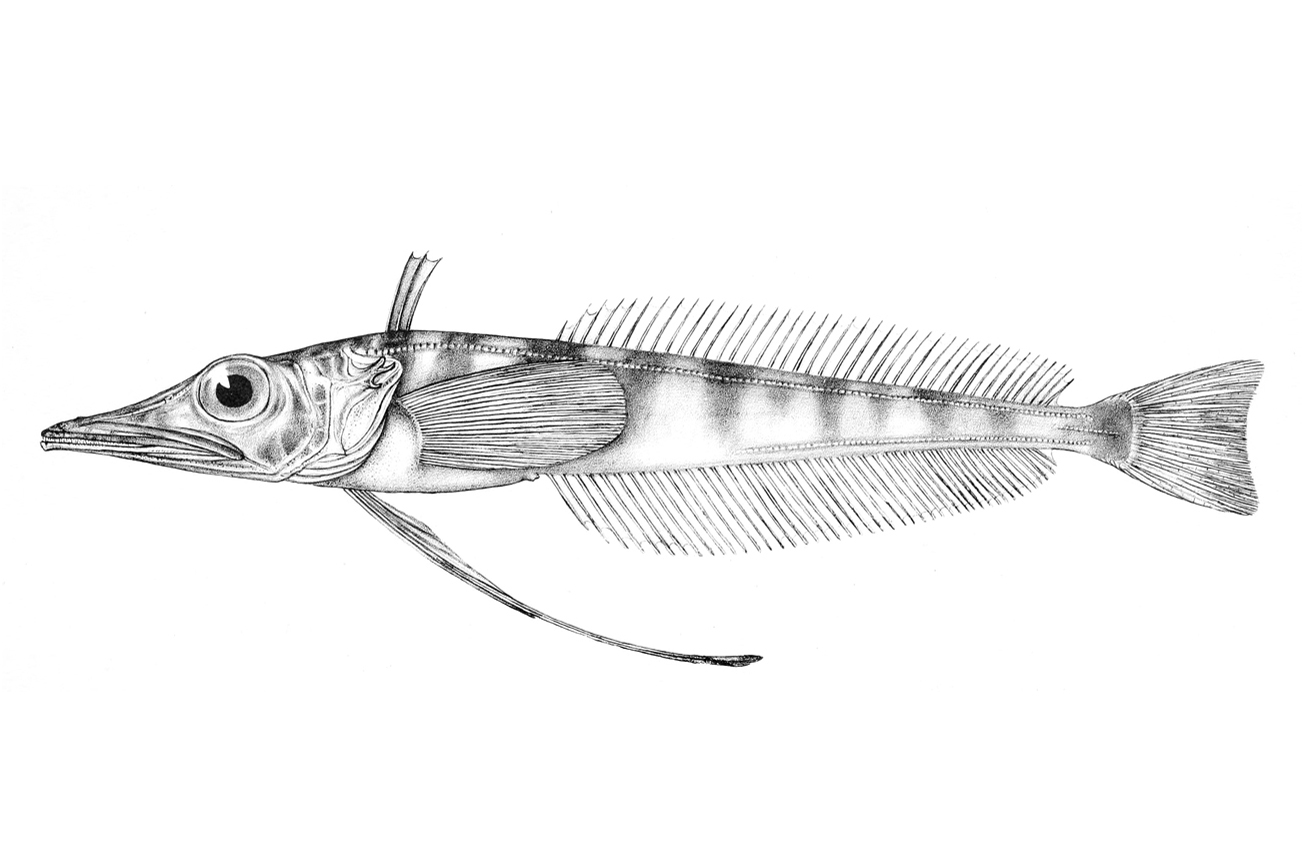
- Holotype of Cryodraco atkinsoni

Scientific classification
- Kingdom: Animalia
- Phylum: Chordata
- Class: Actinopterygii
- Order: Perciformes
- Family: Channichthyidae
- Genus: Cryodraco
- Species: C. atkinsoni

Binomial name
- Cryodraco atkinsoni Regan, 1914

Synonyms
- Pagetodes atkinsoni (Regan, 1914)

= Cryodraco atkinsoni =

Species of crocodile icefish

Cryodraco atkinsoni is a bathydemersal species of marine ray-finned fish belonging to the family Channichthyidae, the crocodile icefishes. It is endemic to the waters of the eastern part of the Southern Ocean.

== Taxonomy ==
Cryodraco atkinsoni was first formally described in 1914 by the English ichthyologist Charles Tate Regan with the type locality given as the Ross Sea in the Southern Ocean where it had been collected by the Terra Nova Expedition. Some authorities treat this taxon as a synonym of C. antarcticus. However, recent morphological and molecular analyses have found that this species is a distinct species from C. anatarcticus. The specific name honours Edward Leicester Atkinson who was the surgeon on the Terra Nova Expedition.

== Description ==
Cryodraco atkinsoni has up to 10 dark bars on each side of its body with dark spots present on its head, and is distinguished from congener Cryodraco antarcticus by being much smaller having a maximum total length of 29.3 cm (11.5 in) compared to maximum total length of 39.3 cm (15.5 in). The first dorsal fin is blackish and the dusky-colored pelvic fins are elongated. The dorsal fins contain 3 spines and 42 soft rays while the anal fin has 46 soft rays.

== Distribution, habitat and biology ==
Cryodraco atkinsoni is found in the Southern Ocean where it confined to the waters of the eastern Antarctic. It is a bathydemersal species which is found as deep as 296 m (971 ft). This predatory species feeds on fishes and krill.

== Fisheries ==
Cryodraco atkinsoni is of no importance to commercial fisheries.
