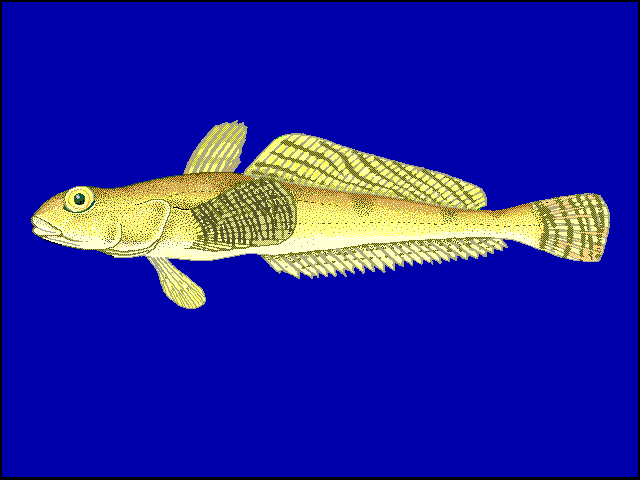
- Illustration
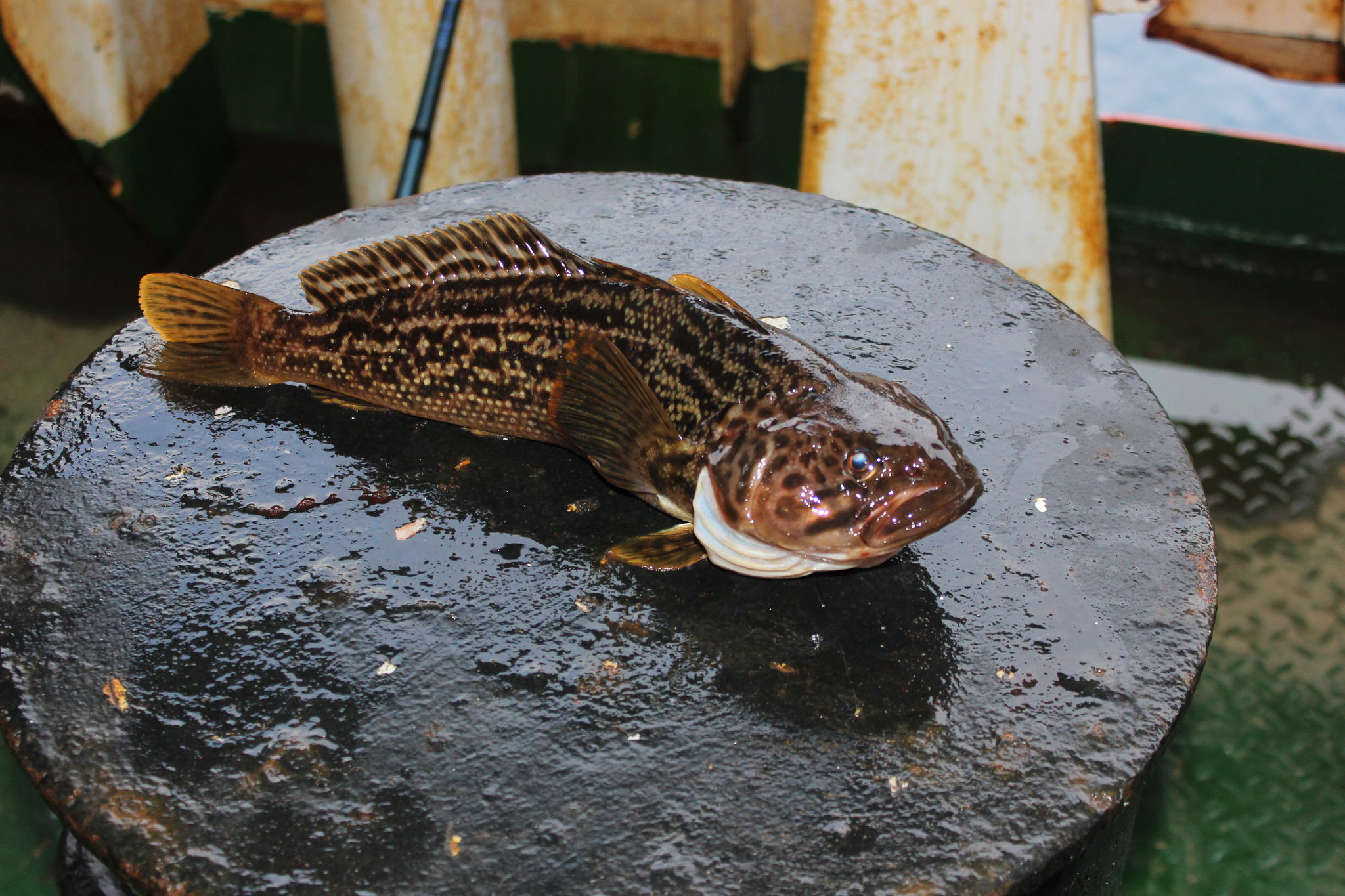
- Specimen caught off Grikurov Point, King George Island (South Shetland Islands), Antarctica

Scientific classification
- Kingdom: Animalia
- Phylum: Chordata
- Class: Actinopterygii
- Order: Perciformes
- Family: Nototheniidae
- Genus: Gobionotothen
- Species: G. gibberifrons

Binomial name
- Gobionotothen gibberifrons (Einar Lönnberg, 1905)

Synonyms
- Notothenia gibberifrons Lönnberg, 1905; Notothenia vaillanti Regan, 1913

= Gobionotothen gibberifrons =

Species of fish

Gobionotothen gibberifrons, the humped rockcod or the humphead notothen, is a species of marine ray-finned fish belonging to the family Nototheniidae, the notothens or cod icefishes. It is native to the islands of the Scotia Arc (the South Shetland, South Orkney, South Sandwich and South Georgia islands), the northern part of the Antarctic Peninsula, and Heard Island in the Southern Ocean. This species inhabits depths of 6-429 m (20-1,407 ft), but is most abundant at depths of 100-400 m (328-1,312 ft), at least around Elephant Island.

== Taxonomy and etymology ==
Gobionotothen gibberifrons was first formally described in 1905 as Notothenia gibberifrons by the Swedish zoologist Einar Lönnberg with the type locality given as the seven locations around South Georgia in the Southern Ocean. The specific name gibberifrons is a compound of gibber which means "humpbacked" and frons meaning "forehead", an allusion to the convex forehead.

== Description ==
This species is distinguished by its steep snout profile, narrow interorbital region (or the interorbital space) and humped forehead (the head is depressed behind the eyes). 1-2 series of small, conical teeth are present on each jaw, and the gill rakers are short.

The general body color is yellowish with irregular dark spots and blotches present on the upper part of the head and body. Juveniles have irregular cross-bars on the body (broken up into three or four series of alternating spots) that are rarely present in adults. The fins are greenish (with the only exception being the anal fin which is pale with 2-3 horizontal bands). The dorsal, caudal and pectoral fins have a series of brown spots present that form transverse bands. The maximum recorded length of this species is 55 cm (21.7 inches), but a length of 40 cm (15.7 inches) is more common.

== Ecology ==
This species is a benthopelagic predator that feeds on polychaetes, echiurans, sipunculids, priapulids, bivalves and crustaceans. If krill is abundant, this species will feed heavily on it. Fish eggs are also taken when available. This species reaches sexual maturity at 36 cm (14.2 inches) TL for both sexes. Males first spawn at 36 cm TL and females first spawn at 38.6 cm (15.2 inches) TL. Mature females may spawn for the first time at 6-8 years of age, and up to 143,620 eggs of up to 2.5 mm diameter may be laid. Spawning occurs from late winter to early spring (the exact months are different from place to place: i.e. August-September around Elephant Island and July-August at South Georgia). Hatching takes place in spring and early summer, and length at hatching is around 7 mm SL. The larvae appear in the water column in September around South Georgia and in November around Elephant Island. The larvae only end their pelagic phase at the end of summer and change to a benthopelagic lifestyle from that time on. Predators include the marbled rockcod (Notothenia rossii), South Georgia icefish (Pseudochaenichthys georgianus), blackfin icefish (Chaenocephalus aceratus), imperial shag (Phalacrocorax atriceps) and the Antarctic fur seal (Arctocephalus gazella).

== Commercial importance ==
This species is of minor importance to commercial fisheries at present, but it once was heavily fished (total catches amounted to 21,800 tonnes (24,030 tons) in the year 1978 alone).
