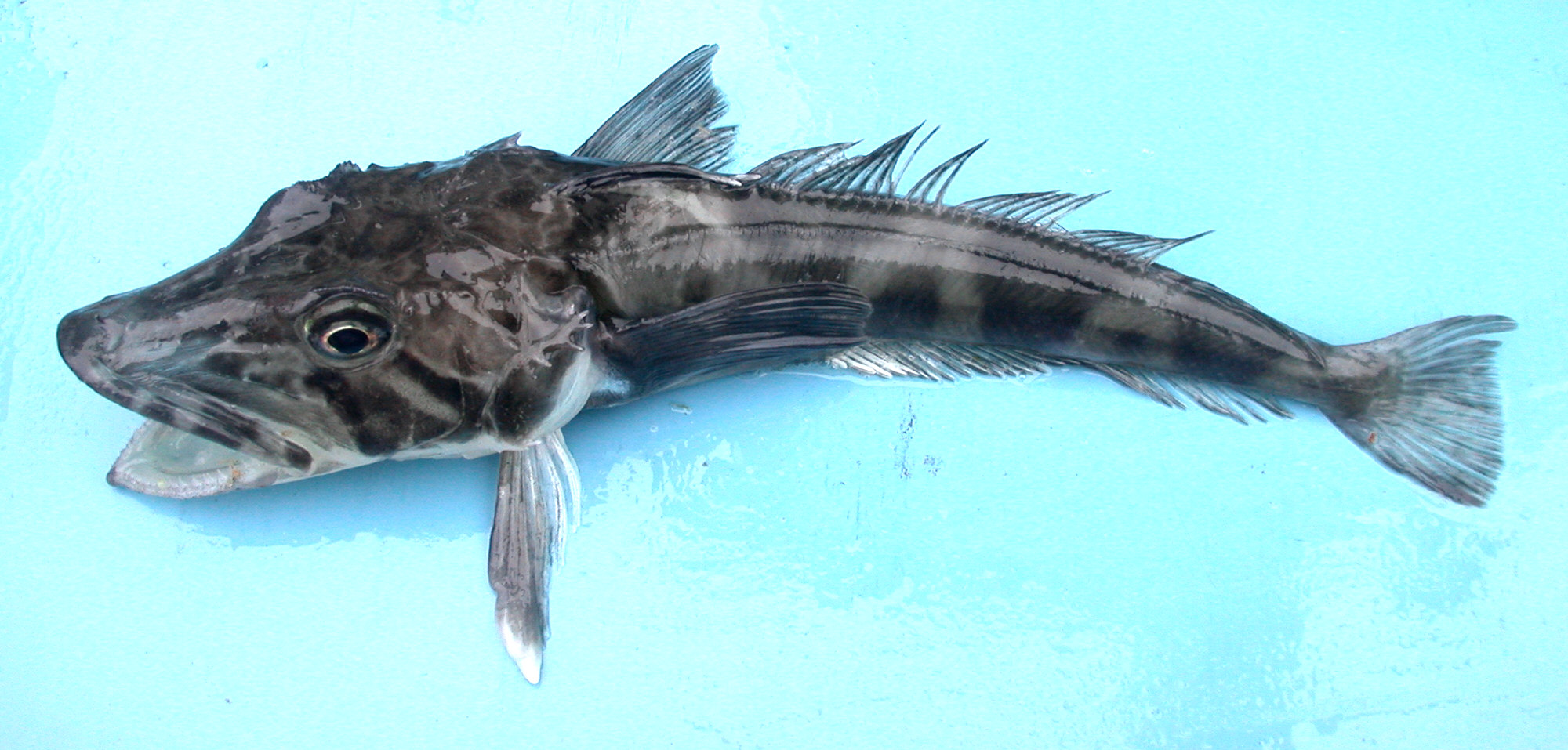
- A specimen caught off the South Shetland Islands. Photo Valerie Loeb of the NOAA

Scientific classification
- Kingdom: Animalia
- Phylum: Chordata
- Class: Actinopterygii
- Order: Perciformes
- Family: Channichthyidae
- Genus: Chionodraco
- Species: C. rastrospinosus

Binomial name
- Chionodraco rastrospinosus DeWitt & Hureau, 1979

= Chionodraco rastrospinosus =

Species of fish

The ocellated icefish (Chionodraco rastrospinosus) is a fish belonging to the Channichthyidae family. It lives in the cold waters off Antarctica and is known for having transparent haemoglobin-free blood.

C. rastrospinosus live in the Southern Ocean up to a depth of 1 km. They are most commonly found on the seabed at 200–400 m. They range from the South Orkney Islands, South Shetland Islands to the Antarctic Peninsula . They grow up to 52 centimetres (20 in) and average 30 centimetres (12 in). The adults feed on krill and other fish. Larvae are 17 mm long when they hatch, and grow by about 2 mm a week. The larval stage lasts for up to 18 months during which they feed mainly on krill. They become sexually mature at four years, and normally live up to about eight years, but sometimes as long as twelve. In the Antarctic autumn, adult C. rastrospinosus migrate to shallow waters to spawn at a depth of 200–300 m. The eggs are scattered and hatch six months later around April.

== Blood colour ==
Haemoglobin gives oxygenated blood its red colour. Unlike other vertebrates, fish of the Antarctic icefish family (Channichthyidae) do not use haemoglobin to transport oxygen around their bodies; instead, the small amount of oxygen that simply dissolves in blood plasma is utilized. In 2011 Tokyo Sea Life Park claimed that C. rastrospinosus has totally transparent blood "like clear water", after dissecting a specimen. In 1954, Ruud noted that Chaenocephalus aceratus, another member of this family, had almost transparent blood, in contrast to the yellowish blood of other members. C. aceratus and C. rastrospinosus both fail to express the major adult α-globin, α1, due to the same 5' truncation of the gene, and have lost the β-globin gene entirely. Zhao et al. propose that an ancestral channichthyid fish lost expression of both genes through a single mutation. Antarctic icefish also have very few erythrocytes. It is believed they benefit from loss of reliance on haemoglobin-containing erythrocytes for oxygen transport by having less viscous, more easily pumped blood. They compensate for this loss by having lower metabolic rates, larger gills, scaleless skin that can contribute more to gas exchange, wider capillaries and significantly increased blood volume and cardiac output.

== Captive specimens ==
Tokyo Sea Life Park holds the only captive fish. A male and female pair were donated along with other species by fishermen of the Fukuei-maru krill trawler as part of a programme to collect bycatch for the park. In January 2013 the female spawned, and by 7 May the first egg hatched with about 20 more larva in the following two weeks. Previously, live specimens have been held for scientific research elsewhere.

== Original Description ==
DeWitt, H. H. & Jean-Claude Hureau. 1979. Fishes collected during "Hero" cruise 72-2 in the Palmer Archipelago, Antarctica, with the description of two new genera and three new species. Bulletin du Muséum National d’Histoire Naturelle, Section A, Zoologie Biologie et Ecologie d’Animal, 4 1(3): 775–820.

== See also ==
- Wildlife of Antarctica
