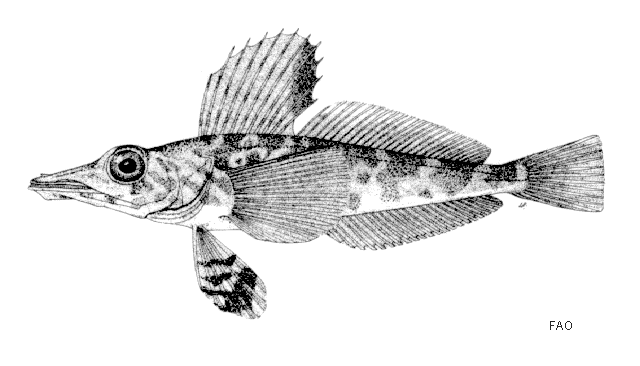

Scientific classification
- Kingdom: Animalia
- Phylum: Chordata
- Class: Actinopterygii
- Order: Perciformes
- Family: Channichthyidae
- Genus: Pagetopsis
- Species: P. maculata

Binomial name
- Pagetopsis maculata Barsukov & Permitin, 1958

= Pagetopsis maculata =

Species of crocodile icefish

Pagetopsis maculata is a species of marine ray-finned fish belonging to the family Channichthyidae, the crocodile icefishes. It is found in the Southern Ocean. It is of no interest to commercial fisheries.

== Taxonomy ==
Pagetopsis maculata was first formally described in 1958 as Pagetopsis maculatus by the Soviet scientists Vladimir Viktorovich Barsukov and Yuri Yefimovich Permitin with the type locality given as MacKenzie Bay. The specific name should have been feminine and was subsequently changed to maculata, an allusion to the more irregular blotched pattern on its body compared to the striped pattern of P. macropterus. The specific name maculata means "spotted".

== Description ==
Pagetopsis maculata is greyish-green but whitish ventrally with 15 irregularly shaped dark cross-bars on each side of its body that are lighter at the centre. Dark stripes are also present on the cheek and otherwise uniformly blackish first dorsal fin. The pelvic fin is also striped. The dorsal fins contain 9 to 12 spines and 25 to 27 soft rays while the anal fin has 22 to 24 soft rays. The maxilla reaches to or just beyond the front of the orbit. This species attains a maximum total length of 25 cm (9.8 in).

== Distribution, habitat and biology ==
Pagetopsis maculata has a circum-Antarctic distribution on the continental shelf from 200 to 800 m (660 to 2,620 ft). They have large eyes, the colour pattern and the reported depths of capture seem to infer that this bathydemersal species inhabits deeper water than its congener Pagetopsis macropterus. This species has a long larval pelagic phase and is of no interest to commercial fisheries.
