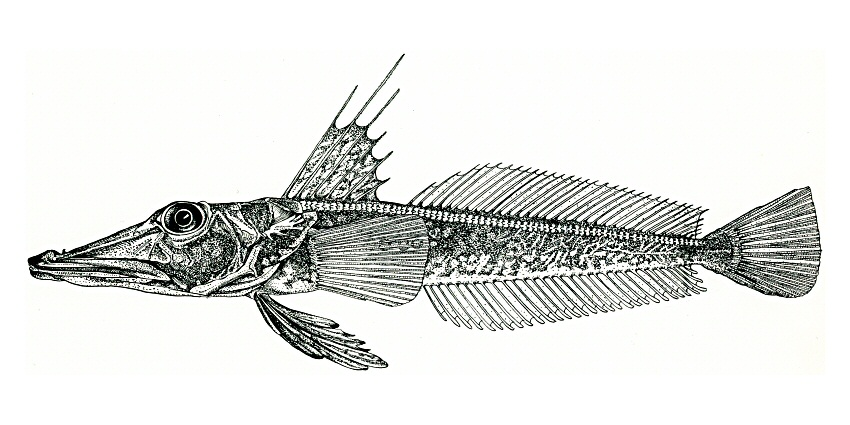
- Illustration of the holotype

Scientific classification
- Kingdom: Animalia
- Phylum: Chordata
- Class: Actinopterygii
- Order: Perciformes
- Family: Channichthyidae
- Genus: Channichthys
- Species: C. richardsoni

Binomial name
- Channichthys richardsoni Shandikov, 2011

= Channichthys richardsoni =

Species of fish

Channichthys richardsoni, the robust icefish, is a demersal species of marine ray-finned fish belonging to the family Channichthyidae, the crocodile icefishes. It is endemic to the shelf waters of the Kerguelen Islands in the Southern Ocean. It lives at depths of 126–310 metres (413–1,017 ft).

== Taxonomy ==
The species name is given in honour of the Scottish naturalist John Richardson, who described the first species of icefish Channichthys rhinoceratus, and established the genus Channichthys. Fishbase treats it as a valid species but Catalog of Fishes treats it as a junior synonym of C. rhinoceratus.

== Description ==
This heavy-bodied species is dark grey to brown in coloration and has 3-4 dark cross bars on its body. There are up to 6 narrow dark stripes on the caudal fins and pelvic fins. Dark spots and blotches are present on the ventral part of body and head. The lower jaw extends to about one-third to half of the eye diameter below the eye.

It is distinguished from other Channichthys species (to whom it is very similar with) by the moderate size of its eyes, number of gill rakers on the lower arch (6-15), longer snout (approximately equal to half the length of the head) and other characteristics, such as the relatively robust body compared to other Channichthys species (which gave this species its common name) and relatively small eye (in some specimens just reaching 33% of snout length). The maximum size recorded for this species was a post-spawning female of size 37.4 centimetres (14.7 in) TL.

It is a piscivorous (fish-eating) species. Maturity is reached at 29–31 centimetres (11–12 in) TL in females. Spawning occurs from autumn to early winter.

This species is of no interest to commercial fisheries.
