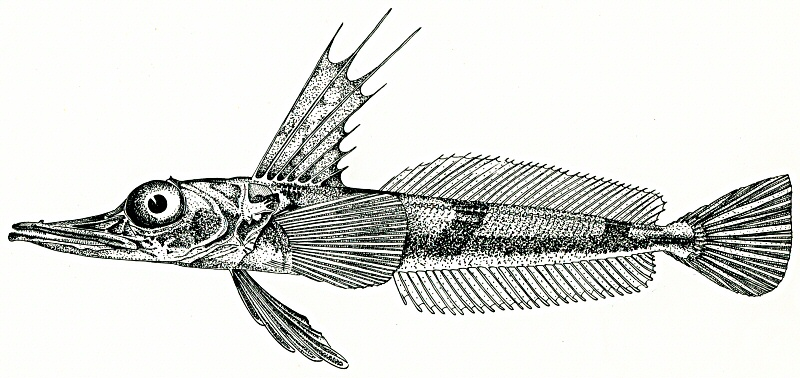
- Illustration of the holotype

Scientific classification
- Kingdom: Animalia
- Phylum: Chordata
- Class: Actinopterygii
- Order: Perciformes
- Family: Channichthyidae
- Genus: Channichthys
- Species: C. irinae

Binomial name
- Channichthys irinae Shandikov, 1995

= Channichthys irinae =

Species of fish

Channichthys irinae, the pygmy icefish, is a species of marine ray-finned fish belonging to the family Channichthyidae, the crocodile icefishes. It is endemic to the Kerguelen Islands in the Southern Ocean.

== Taxonomy ==
Channichthys irinae was first formally described in 1995 by the Ukrainian based ichthyologist Gennadiy A. Shandikov with the type locality given as the southwestern Indian Ocean, northeast of Kerguelen Island. Fishbase treats it as a valid species but Catalog of Fishes treats it as a junior synonym of C. panticapaei.

== Description ==
Channichthys irinae grows to a maximum length of 25.9 cm (10.2 in). This species is very similar to Channichthys mithridatis (to which it is closely related), but it has more gill rakers in more and longer rows (21 to 30 in two rows for C. irinae compared to 11 to 16 in one row for C. mithraditis). Distinguishing factors from other Channichthys species also include the fact that it has the largest eye diameter relative to snout length (45.9% at the very least, with specimens sometimes reaching 56%).

== Distribution, habitat and biology ==
Channichthys irinae is endemic to the Southern Ocean around the Kerguelen Islands. It is a demersal species living at depths of 165 to 310 m (540 to 1,020 ft). This species mainly feeds on pelagic zooplankton and is of no interest to commercial fisheries.
