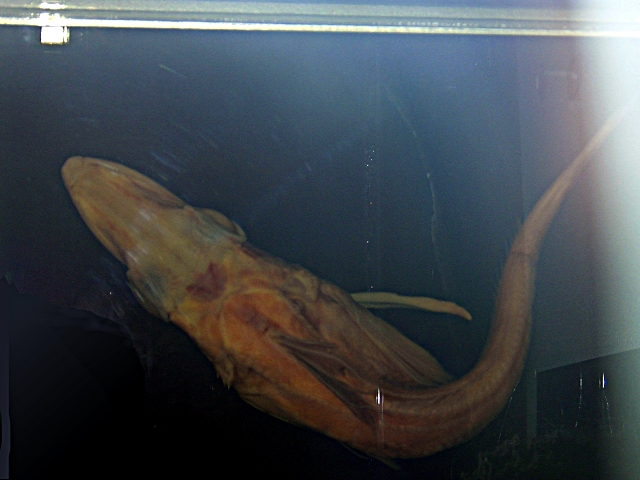
- Chionodraco myersi

Scientific classification
- Kingdom: Animalia
- Phylum: Chordata
- Class: Actinopterygii
- Order: Perciformes
- Family: Channichthyidae
- Genus: Chionodraco
- Species: C. myersi

Binomial name
- Chionodraco myersi H. H. DeWitt & J. C. Tyler, 1960

Synonyms
- Chionodraco markhami Miller & Reseck, 1961

= Chionodraco myersi =

Species of fish

Chionodraco myersi, the Myers's icefish, is a species of marine ray-finned fish belonging to the family Channichthyidae, the crocodile icefishes. It is found in the Southern Ocean.

== Taxonomy ==
Chionodraco myersi was first formally described in 1960 by the American ichthyologists Hugh Hamilton DeWitt and James C. Tyler with the type locality given as off Terra Nova Bay in the southwestern Ross Sea.

== Etymology ==
The specific name honours the American ichthyologist George S. Myers in recognition of the support he gave to the Stanford Antarctic Biological Research Program of 1958-1959, on which the type was obtained.

== Description ==
Chionodraco myersi has a low knob on its snout rather than a spine and lacks the roughened ridges above the eyes shown by C. hamatus. The dorsal fins have between 5 and 7 spines and 36-40 soft rays while the anal fin has 34-37 soft rays. This species is pale greyish with a white belly and has five to six dark cross-bars on each side of its body. The cheeks have two dark stripes. The males and females can be differentiated by the male having a significantly higher first dorsal fin. Large males tend to be darker than similar-sized females, and the second dorsal fins and anal fins of mature males can be dusky in color as opposed to the fully black fins of mature females (however, the other fins are pale regardless of sex and maturity). The maximum length of this species is 38 cm (15 in).

== Distribution and habitat ==
Chionodraco myersi is found around the continent of Antarctica in the waters of its continental shelf, it is a bathydemersal species which is found at depths between 200 and 800 m (660 and 2,620 ft).

== Biology ==
Chionodraco myersi adults have a diet consisting of fish, particularly the Antarctic silverfish (Pleuragramma antarctica) and euphausiids (krill) (e.g. Euphasia crystallorphia). Sexual dimorphism can be seen in the body color.

The genome of this species was sequenced in 2019.

== Fisheries ==
Chionodraco myersi is one of the most abundant species of crocodile icefish in the Ross Sea; however, it is of no interest to commercial fisheries.
