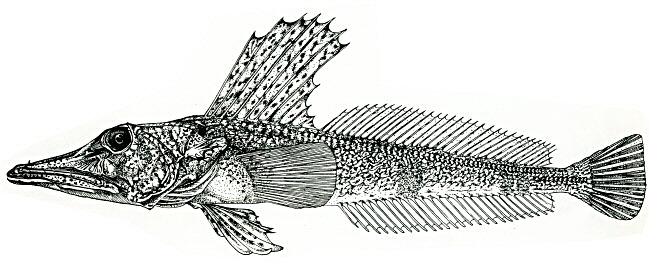
- Illustration

Scientific classification
- Kingdom: Animalia
- Phylum: Chordata
- Class: Actinopterygii
- Order: Perciformes
- Family: Channichthyidae
- Genus: Channichthys
- Species: C. velifer

Binomial name
- Channichthys velifer E. E. Meisner, 1974

= Channichthys velifer =

Species of fish

Channichthys velifer, or the sail icefish, is a species of marine ray-finned fish belonging to the family Channichthyidae, the crocodile icefishes. It is endemic to the Kerguelen Plateau area of the Southern Ocean. This demersal species lives at depths of 125 to 150 m (410 to 492 ft). It is described to have a light brownish-olive or grayish-olive color, with a white belly and dark spots on the caudal and dorsal fins forming brush-like patterns. The anal fins are whitish and dark brown spots are sometimes present. Preservation in formalin results in a reddish color. The granulation is moderate, and is better expressed in larger specimens. The dorsal fin membranes are high and there is a large number of dorsal fin rays, distinguishing it from similar Channichthys species (e.g. Channichthys rugosus). Furthermore, C.velifer has more pectoral fin rays than C.rugosus. This species feeds on fishes and cephalopods and is of no interest to commercial fisheries.
