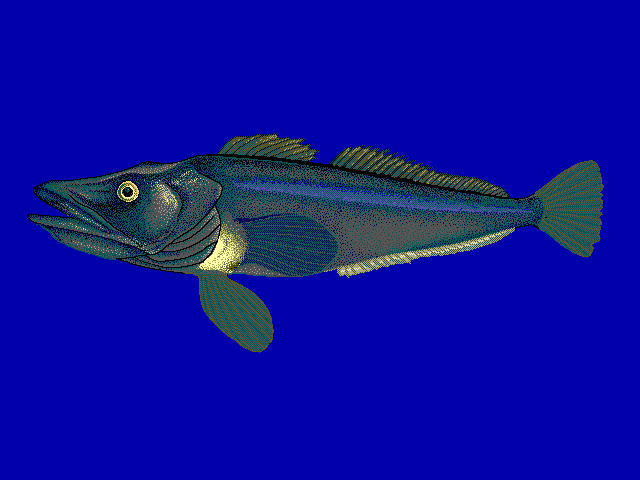
- Source: http://www.fishbase.org

Conservation status
- Endangered (IUCN 3.1)

Scientific classification
- Kingdom: Animalia
- Phylum: Chordata
- Class: Actinopterygii
- Division: Teleostei
- Order: Perciformes
- Family: Channichthyidae
- Genus: Pseudochaenichthys; Norman, 1937
- Species: P. georgianus

Binomial name
- Pseudochaenichthys georgianus Norman, 1937

= Pseudochaenichthys =

Species of fish

Pseudochaenichthys is a monotypic genus of marine ray-finned fish belonging to the family Channichthyidae, the crocodile icefishes. Its only member is Pseudochaenichthys georgianus, the South Georgia icefish, which is found in the Southern Ocean.

== Taxonomy ==
Pseudochaenichthys was first described as a genus in 1937 by the English ichthyologist John Roxborough Norman when he was describing its only species Pseudochaenichthys georgianus. The type locality of P. georgianus is South Georgia Island. The genus name is a compound of pseudo which means "false" and Chaenichthys, an alternative spelling for Channichthys, probably an allusion to its similarity of fishes in that genus. The specific name georgianus means that it belongs to (South) Georgia.

== Description ==
Pseudochaenichthys, the South Georgia icefish, is a dark greyish-green species with blackish first dorsal and pelvic fins. The pelvic fins have white outer borders. The dorsal fin has 7 to 9 spines and 28 to 32 soft rays while the anal fin has 27 to 31 soft rays. There is a forward curving spine on the snout, a projecting lower jaw and there are 4 to 5 spines on the operculum. There are 3 lateral lines which do not have any bony plates on them. It has wide, fan shaped pelvic fins, the first and second dorsal fins are clearly separated and the caudal fin is rounded. This species grows to a total length of 60 centimetres (24 in) although a more typical total length is 50 cm (20 in). It is thought to attain sexual maturity at 42.5 cm (16.7 in). The maximum published weight of this species is 2.1 kg (4.6 lb).

== Distribution and habitat ==
Pseudochaenichthys georgianus is known only from the waters off the northern Antarctic Peninsula and the Scotia Sea. It is a demersal species which occurs from surface waters to a depth of 475 metres (1,558 ft).

== Biology ==
Pseudochaenichthys georgianus adults feed mainly on krill, especially Antarctic krill (Euphasia superba) and fishes, mainly channichthyids and nototheniids). This species is a synchronous spawner and spawning takes place in autumn, with the eggs hatching from August to October.

== Human interactions ==
Pseudochaenichthys georgianus has not been targeted by commercial fisheries since 1990, but remains a bycatch species in trawls targeting pike icefish and krill.

The species was listed as endangered by the IUCN in 2024, due to a perceived decline of more than 50% since the 1990s driven primarily by bycatch and potentially climate change. A 2026 paper by M.A. Collins and coauthors has criticised this assessment, as it overestimated the generation time of the species, relies on outdated data and surveying methods that likely underrepresent the species' abundance. These authors suggest that there is no evidence that the species is significantly declining, and that its conservation status should be listed as least concern.
