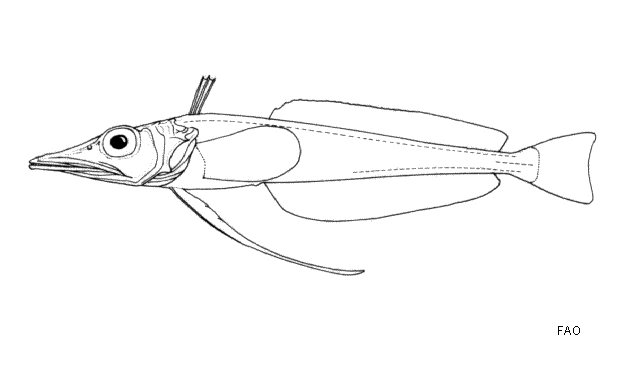
- Illustration by French ichthyologist J.C. Hureau

Scientific classification
- Kingdom: Animalia
- Phylum: Chordata
- Class: Actinopterygii
- Order: Perciformes
- Family: Channichthyidae
- Genus: Cryodraco
- Species: C. antarcticus

Binomial name
- Cryodraco antarcticus Dollo, 1900

Synonyms
- Pagetodes antarcicus (Dollo, 1900)

= Cryodraco antarcticus =

Species of fish

Cryodraco antarcticus, the long-fingered icefish, is a demersal species of marine ray-finned fish belonging to the family Channichthyidae, the crocodile icefishes. It occurs only in deep waters of the Southern Ocean.

== Taxonomy ==
Cryodraco antarcticus was first formally described in 1900 by the Belgian palaeontologist Louis Dollo with the type locality given as 71°22'S, 88°38'W, or 71°18'S, 88°02'W. It is the type species of the genus Cryodraco, which is known as Pagetodes by some authorities.

== Description ==
Cryodraco antarcticus is pale greyish-brown with 5-6 dark cross-bars on its body and dusky-tipped pelvic fins. It is distinguished by the elongate shape of its pelvic fins, which are blackish in the pelagic juveniles. This species can grow up to 39.3 cm (15.5 in).

== Distribution and habitat ==
Cryodraco antarcticus is found near the South Orkney Islands, the Antarctic Peninsula, the Weddell, Bellinghausen, Ross and Davis seas at depths of 90 to 600 m (295 to 1970 ft).

== Biology ==
Cryodraco antarcticus feeds on fishes and krill (studies from 1982 to 1984 revealed mostly fishes and Antarctic krill). The larvae have a long late winter pelagic phase. It is closely related to the blackfin icefish (Chaenocephalus aceratus) but differs in a number of meristic characteristics. They are similar in size, colouration and body shape, as well as sharing a many biological characters, including breeding behaviour, and diet. They seem to occupy very similar niches in the ecosystem of the southern Scotia Arc. C. antarcticus is, however, less numerous than the blackfin icefish and does not share its habitats. C. antarcticus appears to replace its relative in deeper areas and higher Antarctic waters.

== Fisheries ==
Cryodraco antarcticus is of minor importance to commercial fisheries.
