= Eastern Dallmann Bay Antarctic Specially Protected Area =

Coordinates: 64°10′S 62°40′W

Brabant Island location map

The Eastern Dallmann Bay Antarctic Specially Protected Area is a marine Antarctic Specially Protected Area (ASPA 153) lying at the eastern end of Dallmann Bay, adjacent to the north-western and northern coasts of Brabant Island in the Palmer Archipelago of Antarctica. With an area of about 676 km^{2} it covers shallow marine waters that are suitable for bottom trawling for demersal fish and other benthic organisms for scientific research. The area contains important habitat for juvenile fish, especially Black Rockcod and Blackfin Icefish. The fish collected from the site are used in studies of their physiological and biochemical adaptations to low temperatures.
