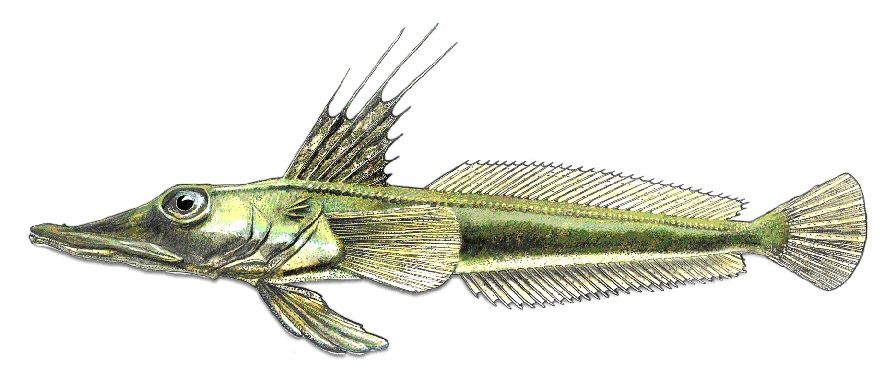
- Illustration of the holotype

Scientific classification
- Kingdom: Animalia
- Phylum: Chordata
- Class: Actinopterygii
- Order: Perciformes
- Family: Channichthyidae
- Genus: Channichthys
- Species: C. mithridatis

Binomial name
- Channichthys mithridatis Shandikov, 1995

= Channichthys mithridatis =

Green icefish

Species of fish

Channichthys mithridatis, the green icefish, is a species of marine ray-finned fish belonging to the family Channichthyidae, the crocodile icefishes. It is endemic to the Kerguelen Islands in the Southern Ocean.

== Taxonomy ==
Channichthys mithridatis was first formally described in 2008 by Gennadiy A. Shandikov with the type locality given as Kerguelen Island. Fishbase treats C. mithridatis as a valid species but Catalog of Fishes treats it as a junior synonym of C. rhinoceratus. The specific name mithridatis is a Latinisation of Mithridates, the King of Pontus in the Hellenistic period who ruled over Panticapaeum, the modern city of Kerch in the Crimea where the institute yugNIRO which studied Antarctic fisheries was based.

== Description ==
Channichthys mithridatis attains a maximum total length of 37 cm (15 in). The first dorsal fin has spines and there are 32-34 dorsal fin rays while the anal fin contains 30-32 soft rays. The overall colour of the body and head varies from light green to dark olive with the crown of the head being rather darker than the body. There are 3-4 darker cross bars, two of which are underneath the second dorsal fin, and are present on the body of some individuals. The lower part of the head and body are white. There are clear silver-white spots at the bases of the pectoral fins and between the pelvic fins. Males are darker than females.

== Distribution, habitat, and biology ==
Channichthys mithridatis is a bathydemersal species which is endemic to the Kerguelen islands in the Southern Ocean. It is found at depths of 250 to 310 m (820 to 1,020 ft) where it feeds on other fishes. Females are sexually mature when they reach a total length of 30–32 cm (12–13 in).

== Fisheries ==
Channichthys mithridatis is caught using bottom trawls.
