= Cryodraco pappenheimi =

Scientific classification
- Kingdom: Animalia
- Phylum: Chordata
- Class: Actinopterygii
- Order: Perciformes
- Family: Channichthyidae
- Genus: Cryodraco
- Species: C. pappenheimi

Binomial name
- Cryodraco pappenheimi Regan, 1913

Species of crocodile icefish

Cryodraco pappenheimi is a bathydemersal species of marine ray-finned fish belonging to the family Channichthyidae, the crocodile icefishes. It occurs in the Southern Ocean.

The status of C. pappenheimi as a Cryodraco species is unclear. The holotype was deposited in the Natural History Museum, Berlin and has been lost. From descriptions of this taxon, it is possible that it does not belong in the genus Cryodraco.
