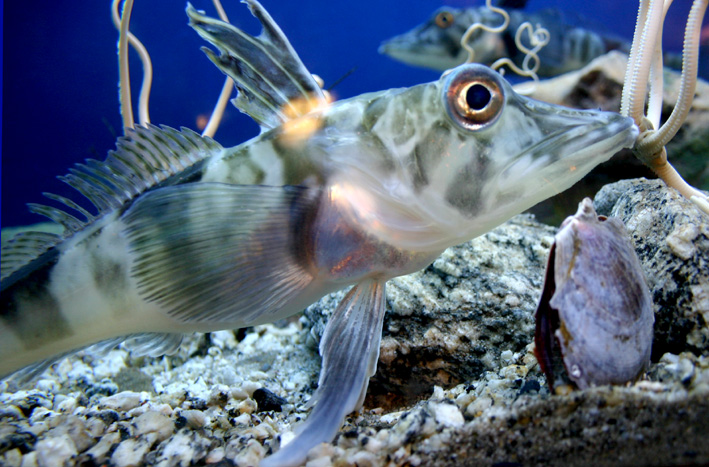
- C. hamatus

Scientific classification
- Kingdom: Animalia
- Phylum: Chordata
- Class: Actinopterygii
- Order: Perciformes
- Family: Channichthyidae
- Genus: Chionodraco; Lönnberg, 1906

Type species
- Chionodraco hamatus Lönnberg, 1905

= Chionodraco =

Genus of fishes

Chionodraco is a genus of marine ray-finned fish belonging to the family Channichthyidae, the crocodile icefishes. They are found in the Southern Ocean.

== Taxonomy ==
Chionodraco was first described as a genus in 1905 by the Swedish zoologist Einar Lönnberg when he described the Chaenichthys hamatus which he subsequently placed in a new monotypic genus. The genus name is a compound of chionos meaning "snow" and draco which means "dragon", Lönnberg did not explain this but it may allude to a relationship with the genus Cryodraco.

== Species ==
There are currently three recognized species in this genus:

- Chionodraco hamatus (Lönnberg, 1905)
- Chionodraco myersi H. H. DeWitt & J. C. Tyler, 1960 (Myers's icefish)
- Chionodraco rastrospinosus H. H. DeWitt & Hureau, 1979 (Ocellated icefish)

== Characteristics ==
Chionodraco icefishes may have the spine on the snout present or it is reduced to a small centrally placed knob. The gill rakers may bear teeth or are vestigial. The upper and lower jaws are of equal length, although the lower jaw may protrude. There are robust spines on the operculum with the other opercular bones each having a pair of spines where they join. The first and second dorsal fins are separate and there are three lateral lines. In the pelvic fin the outermost pair of fin rays are the longest and the tips are covered in thickened skin. The caudal fin is rounded. The maximum total length of these fishes varies from 38 cm (15 in) in C. myersi to 52 cm (20 in) in C. rastrospinosus.

== Distribution and habitat ==
Chionodraco contains two circum-antarctic species, one of which is apparently confined to West Antarctica. They are demersal and pelagic fishes found on the continental shelf and slope.

== Biology ==
Chionodraco icefishes are predatory, feeding on other fish species and krill. They have a long post larval pelagic phase. In common with many other channichthyid fishes, reproduction in Chionodraco hamatus involves laying eggs in a nest and parental guarding. Similar morphological features suggest that at least Chionodraco rastrospinosus has similar reproductive behaviours.

== Fisheries ==
Chionodraco icefishes are targeted by some commercial fisheries and are also taken as bycatch.
