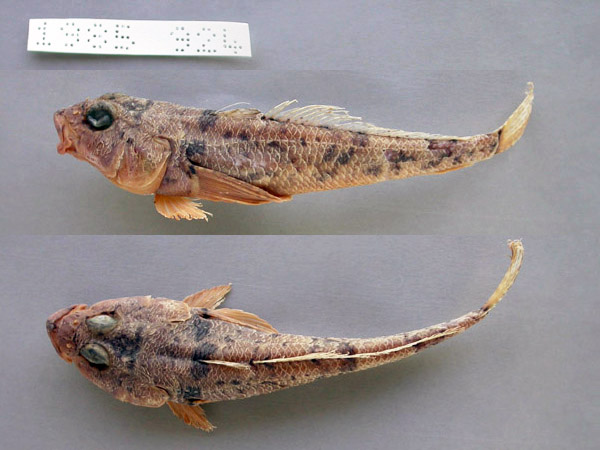
- Dorsal and lateral view of a specimen from the Muséum National d'Histoire Naturelle (MNHN), France

Scientific classification
- Kingdom: Animalia
- Phylum: Chordata
- Class: Actinopterygii
- Order: Perciformes
- Family: Nototheniidae
- Genus: Gobionotothen
- Species: G. marionensis

Binomial name
- Gobionotothen marionensis (Günther, 1880)

Synonyms
- Notothenia marionensis Günther, 1880; Notothenia angustifrons sandwichensis Nybelin, 1947

= Gobionotothen marionensis =

Species of fish

Gobionotothen marionensis, the lobe-lip notothen, is a species of marine ray-finned fish belonging to the family Nototheniidae, the notothens or cod icefishes. It is native to the South Georgia and the South Sandwich Islands in the Atlantic Ocean, and the Crozet and Prince Edward Islands in the Indian Ocean.

== Taxonomy and etymology ==
Gobionotothen marionensis was first formally described in 1880 as Notothenia marionensis by the German-born British ichthyologist Albert Günther with the type locality given as the Challenger Deep off Marion Island in the Indian Section of the Southern Ocean. The type was collected during the Challenger Expedition. G. angustifrons is treated as a synonym of this species by some authorities but as a valid species by others. The specific name marionensis refers to the type locality, Marion Island.

== Description ==
This species is a relatively small notothen, attaining a maximum length of 20 cm (7.9 inches). In alcohol, this species is generally colored grayish-brown, with four indistinct dark saddles on the back. The first saddle reaches the base of the pectoral fin. The rounded caudal fin has a dark bar present. When encountered in real life, the saddles are much more distinct and form transverse bars which break up into spots on each side of the body. Dark spots and blotches are present around the head, fins and lateral part of the body (which are also present in specimens preserved in alcohol, but again, these are much less distinct than in real life). A series of small, dark spots is present on the pectoral fin rays, and a blackish spot is often present on the upper part of the fin's base.

== Ecology ==
This species inhabits shelf waters depths of 0-150 m (0-492 ft). It is a diurnal, benthopelagic predator that feeds on benthic invertebrates. Crustaceans, especially krill, mysids, isopods and amphipods, are the major component of the diet in the Atlantic Ocean, however, polychaetes are also consumed at South Georgia (generally consumed by individuals larger than 12 cm (4.7 inches) in total length). Specimens in the South Sandwich Islands feed almost exclusively on amphipods. Decapods and polychaetes form the main part of the diet at the Prince Edward Islands, where they compose 54% and 30 % of the diet respectively. When the fish reach 7 cm (2.8 inches) in total length, they become ambush predators. Pelagic prey is virtually absent from the diet.

Known predators of this species include the dusky dolphin and the Antarctic fur seal.

== Commercial importance ==
This species is of no interest to commercial fisheries.
