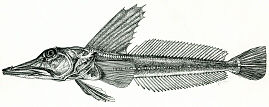

Scientific classification
- Kingdom: Animalia
- Phylum: Chordata
- Class: Actinopterygii
- Order: Perciformes
- Family: Channichthyidae
- Genus: Channichthys
- Species: C. rugosus

Binomial name
- Channichthys rugosus Regan, 1913

= Channichthys rugosus =

Species of fish

Channichthys rugosus, the red icefish, is a species of ray-finned fish in the genus Channichthys. It was described by Regan in 1913. It measures 3 centimetres (1.2 in) in standard length. It is found in the Southern Ocean in the Kerguelen Islands.
