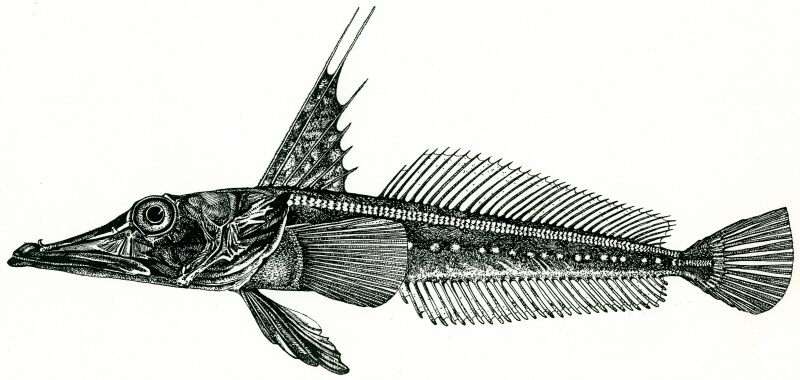
- Illustration of the holotype

Scientific classification
- Kingdom: Animalia
- Phylum: Chordata
- Class: Actinopterygii
- Order: Perciformes
- Family: Channichthyidae
- Genus: Channichthys
- Species: C. panticapaei

Binomial name
- Channichthys panticapaei Shandikov

Synonyms
- Channichthys normani Balushkin, 1996

= Channichthys panticapaei =

Species of fish

Channichthys panticapaei, the charcoal icefish, is a species of marine ray-finned fish belonging to the family Channichthyidae, the crocodile icefishes. It is endemic to the Kerguelen Islands area in the Southern Ocean. This demersal species is found at depths of 112–154 m (367–505 ft) and is sometimes caught in bottom trawls. However, it is not targeted and is of no interest to commercial fisheries at present. It is dark gray to uniformly blackish with long first to third dorsal fin spines. The charcoal icefish reaches lengths of up to 40.2 cm (15.8 in), with females generally being smaller (maximum length being 36.1 cm (14.2 in)). This planktivorous (plankton-eating) species likely spawns from June to July, with maturity reached at 30 cm (11.8 inches) TL / 27 cm (10.6 inches) SL.
