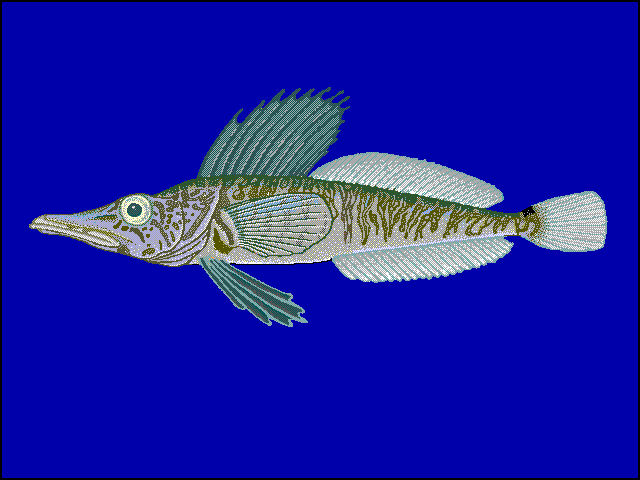
- P. macropterus

Scientific classification
- Kingdom: Animalia
- Phylum: Chordata
- Class: Actinopterygii
- Order: Perciformes
- Family: Channichthyidae
- Genus: Pagetopsis; Regan, 1913

Type species
- Champsocephalus macropterus Boulenger, 1907

= Pagetopsis =

Genus of fishes

Pagetopsis is a genus of marine ray-finned fish belonging to the family Channichthyidae, the crocodile icefishes. The species in this genus are found in the Southern Ocean.

== Taxonomy ==
Pagetopsis was described as a genus in 1913 by the English ichthyologist Charles Tate Regan as a monotypic genus which had Champsocephalus macropterus, which had been described by the Belgian-born British ichthyologist George Albert Boulenger in 1907, as its only species. The genus name is a combination of opsis with Pagetodes, the name given by John Richardson in 1843 to an icefish frozen on the bow of HMS Terror which had been eaten by a cat before it could be preserved, Regan said that Pagetodes could not be used until that fish was rediscovered.

== Species ==
There are currently two recognized species in this genus:

- Pagetopsis macropterus (Boulenger, 1907)
- Pagetopsis maculata Barsukov & Permitin, 1958

== Characteristics ==
Pagetopsis has a forward curving spine on the snout and a slightly protruding lower jaw. There are radiating ridge on the operculum ending in 3 or 4 spiny points, the other opercular bones lack spiny points. There are two lateral lines, neither having any bony plates, although the middle lateral line is restricted to the caudal peduncle. The pelvic fin is fan shaped with a well developed membrane while the first dorsal fin is large and tall and is contiguous with the second dorsal fin. The largest species is P. macropterus which attains a maximum total length of 33 cm (13 in) while the maximum total length of P. maculata is 25 cm (9.8 in).

== Distribution and habitat ==
Pagetopsis Icefishes have a circumAntarctic distribution which extends as far north as the South Shetland Islands and the South Orkney Islands. They are deep water demersal fishes which are at depths down to 800 m (2,600 ft).
