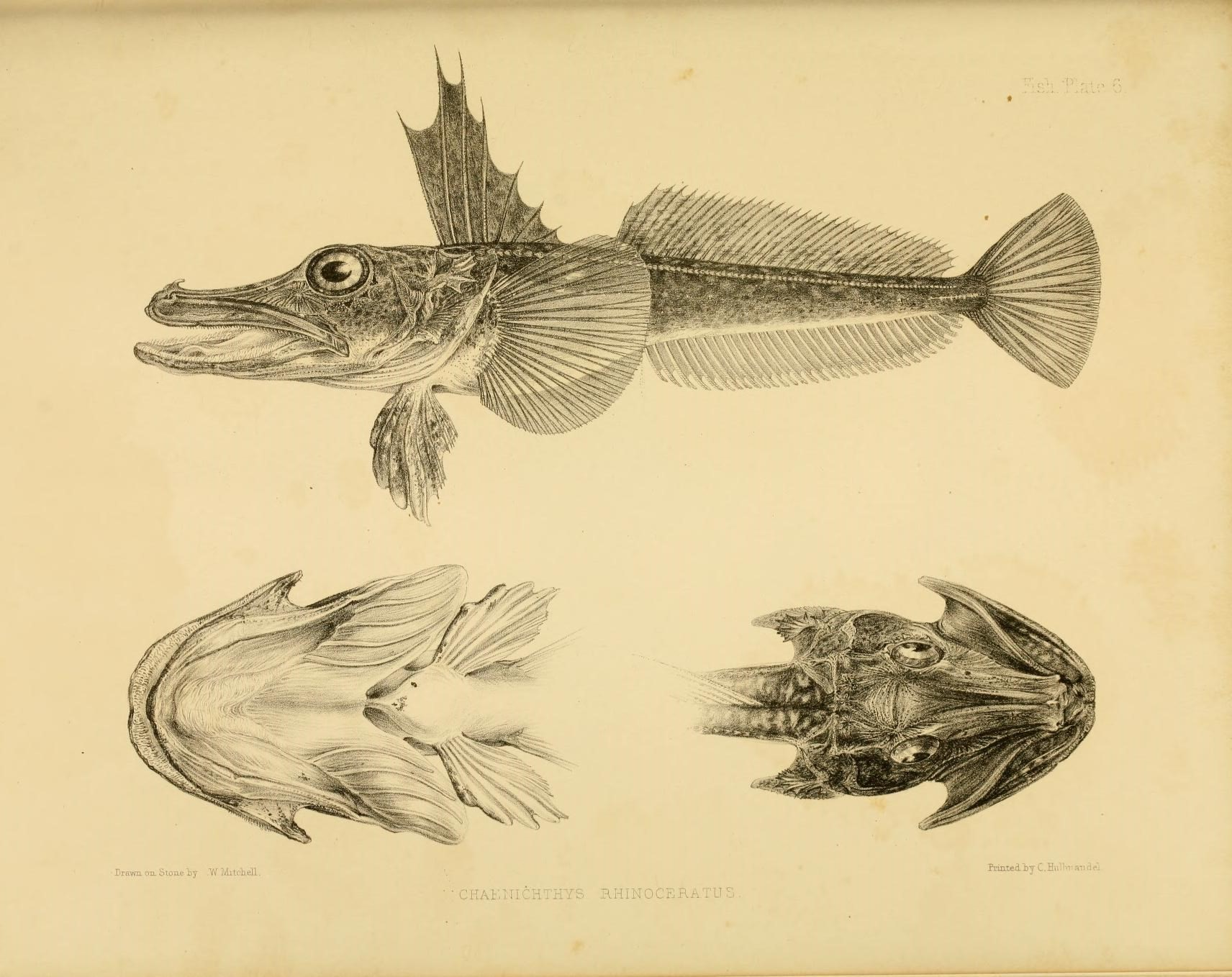
- Illustration

Scientific classification
- Kingdom: Animalia
- Phylum: Chordata
- Class: Actinopterygii
- Order: Perciformes
- Family: Channichthyidae
- Genus: Channichthys
- Species: C. rhinoceratus

Binomial name
- Channichthys rhinoceratus Richardson, 1844

Synonyms
- Channichthys aelitae; Channichthys mithridatis; Channichthys richardsoni

= Channichthys rhinoceratus =

Species of fish

Channichthys rhinoceratus, the unicorn icefish, is a species of marine ray-finned fish belonging to the family Channichthyidae, the crocodile icefishes. It is endemic to the Kerguelen-Heard Plateau in the Southern Ocean. It is a demersal species living from surface waters to depths up to 750 m (2,460 ft). It is considered by some researchers as the only species in the genus Channichthys.

== Description ==
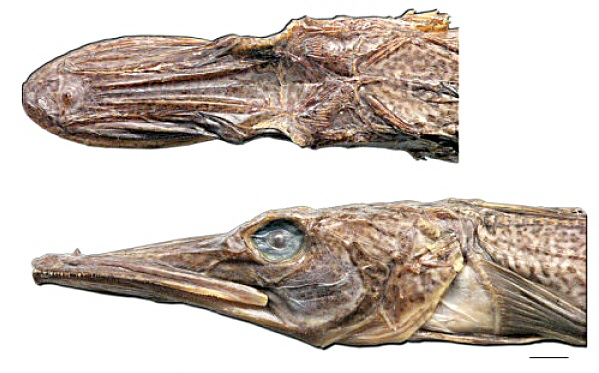
Head of a preserved specimen

Described by Sir John Richardson in 1844 and being the type species of the genus Channichthys, the unicorn icefish is generally pale brown, though smaller specimens have four dark cross-bars present on each side of the body, and dark spots are present on the body, sometimes with reddish patches and dark reticulations are present. Dark spots may be present on the blackish first dorsal fin. Other fins are colored pale or dusky. It grows up to a maximum length of 60 cm (24 inches) and a maximum published weight of 0.5 kg (1.1 lbs). A more common length is 40 cm (16 inches).

Its size (being the largest of the Channichthys species) and the fact that it has the smallest eye diameter relative to snout length of the Channichthys species (28% to 31.6%) distinguish it from its congeners. The large interorbital space of this species should also help distinguish it from C. irinae and C. bospori.

C. rhinoceratus was redescribed in 2020 and the species C. aelitae, C. mithridatis and C. richardsoni were synonymised with that species.

== Biology ==
This species is a typical benthic predator that feeds on fishes (other notothenoids, especially the mackerel icefish Champsocephalus gunnari and other Channichthys species, however, Harpagifer fishes are also taken) and occasionally algae. It is itself preyed on by the black-browed albatross (Thalassarche melanophris).

Sexual maturity is reached when it is around 36–38 cm (14–15 in) in length. This species migrates to shallower waters in January and lays 6,000 to 14,000 eggs in February. The spent fish return to deeper water in June.

Although this species seems to be endemic to the Kerguelen-Heard Plateau, otoliths of this species have been found in the stomach contents of gentoo penguins nesting on Marion Island, seemingly confirming its presence there. However, there is insufficient data to prove that this species is a resident there and not just an occasional visitor. A known predator of this species is the black-browed albatross (Thalassarche melanophris).

== Uses ==
Its flesh is of good quality, though not as good as that of the mackerel icefish, and is of minor importance to commercial fisheries, caught in bottom trawls for mackerel icefish as a bycatch species. Total catches amounted to 80 tonnes (88 tons) in 2010. This has increased to 151 tonnes (166 tons) in 2019. However, this was still much less than the 1,663 tonnes (1,833 tons) allowed for that year.
