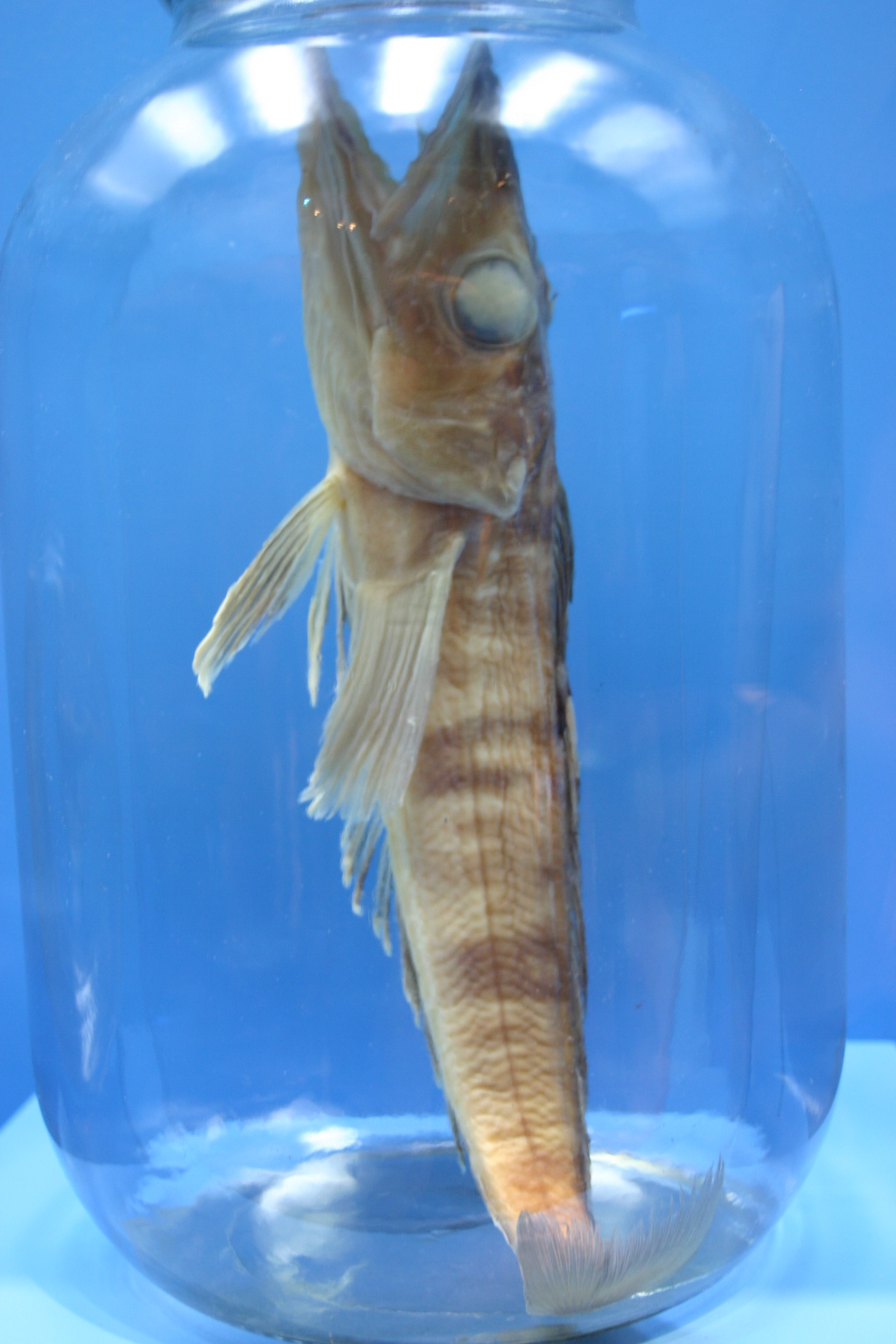
- Mackerel Icefish (C. gunnari)

Scientific classification
- Kingdom: Animalia
- Phylum: Chordata
- Class: Actinopterygii
- Order: Perciformes
- Family: Channichthyidae
- Genus: Champsocephalus; T. N. Gill, 1862

Type species
- Chaenichthys esox Günther, 1861

= Champsocephalus =

Genus of fishes

Champsocephalus is a genus of marine ray-finned fish belonging to the family Channichthyidae, the crocodile icefishes. They are native to the Southern Ocean.

== Taxonomy ==
Champsocephalus was first formally described as a genus in 1862 by the American ichthyologist Theodore Nicholas Gill as he thought that its type species, Chaenichthys esox which had been described in 1861 by Albert Günther, was distinct enough to be classified in its own genus.

== Species ==
There are currently two recognized species in this genus:

- Champsocephalus esox (Günther, 1861) (pike icefish)
- Champsocephalus gunnari Lönnberg, 1905 (mackerel icefish)

== Characteristics ==
Champsocephalus species do not have a spine on the snout. There are three radiating ridges on the operculum each ending in a spine. They have two lateral lines, upper and middle, and these have no bony plates. The bases of the first and second dorsal fins are almost continuous and the caudal fin is emarginate. The maximum standard lengths of these fishes are 33 cm (13 in) for C. esox and 66 cm (26 in) for C. gunnari.

== Distribution and habitat ==
Chamsocephalus icefishes are found in the Southern Ocean. They can be found off South America, the Falkland Islands, South Georgia, the Antarctic Peninsula, Kerguelen, Heard and Bouvet Islands. They are pelagic.

== Biology ==
Chamsocephalus icefishes are predatory and are known to feed on krill, mysids and fishes.

== Fisheries ==
Chamsocephalus icefishes are fished for using trawls off South America, Kerguelen and South Georgia.
