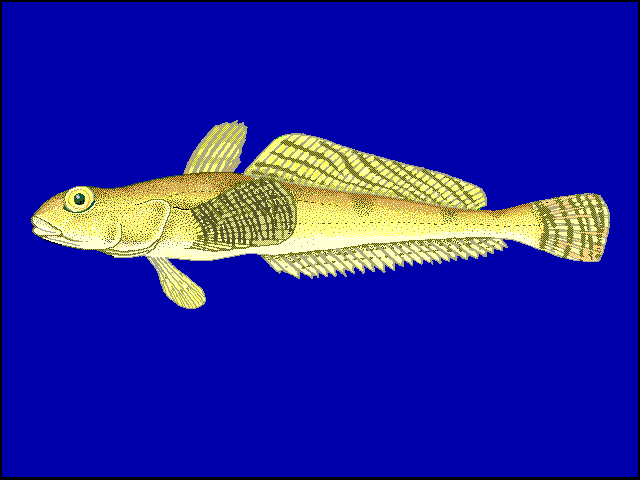
- Gobionotothen gibberifrons

Scientific classification
- Kingdom: Animalia
- Phylum: Chordata
- Class: Actinopterygii
- Order: Perciformes
- Family: Nototheniidae
- Genus: Gobionotothen; Balushkin, 1976

Type species
- Notothenia gibberifrons Lönnberg, 1905

= Gobionotothen =

Genus of fishes

Gobionotothen is a genus of marine ray-finned fishes belonging to the family Nototheniidae, the notothens or cod icefishes. They are native to the Southern Ocean.

== Taxonomy ==
Gobionotothen was first formally described in 1976 by the Russian ichthyologist Arkadii Vladimirovich Balushkin with the type species designated as Notothenia gibberifrons which was described by the Swedish naturalist Einar Lönnberg in 1905 with its type locality given as South Georgia. Some authorities place this taxon in the subfamily Nototheniinae, but the 5th edition of Fishes of the World does not include subfamilies in the Nototheniidae. The name of the genus is a compound of gobio meaning "goby", referring to the goby-like form of these species and notothen, indicating that it is a nothothen.

== Species ==
Five recognized species are in this genus:

- Gobionotothen acuta (Günther, 1880) (triangular rockcod)
- Gobionotothen angustifrons (J. G. Fischer, 1885) (narrowhead rockcod)
- Gobionotothen barsukovi Balushkin, 1991
- Gobionotothen gibberifrons (Lönnberg, 1905) (humped rockcod)
- Gobionotothen marionensis (Günther, 1880) (lobe-lip notothen)

== Characteristics ==
Gobionotothen fishes have elongate bodies which are compressed towards the rear. The head has a convex dorsal profile and the space between the eyes is narrow. The mouth is small without a protruding lower jaw and they do not have large canine-like teeth. They have two lateral lines made up of tubed scales. The head is scaly, excep for the snout, lower jaw, the preorbital and the edge if the preoperculum. They have a rounded caudal fin. The species vary in maximum total length from 20 cm (7.9 in) in G. angustifrons to 55 cm (22 in) in G. gibberifrons.

== Distribution, habitat and biology ==
Gobionotothen fishes have only been recorded from the northern part of the Antarctic Peninsula and the subantarctic islands. They are benthic predators feeding mainly on benthic invertebrates with some fish eggs and krill taken when available.

== Fisheries ==
Gobionotothen species, particularly G. gibberifrons, are moderately important to commercial fisheries off the South Georgia, South Shetland and South Orkney Islands.
