= Gobionotothen acuta =

Scientific classification
- Kingdom: Animalia
- Phylum: Chordata
- Class: Actinopterygii
- Order: Perciformes
- Family: Nototheniidae
- Genus: Gobionotothen
- Species: G. acuta

Binomial name
- Gobionotothen acuta (Günther, 1880)

Synonyms
- Notothenia acuta Günther, 1880

Species of fish

Gobionotothen acuta, the triangular rockcod or the triangular notothen, is a species of marine ray-finned fish belonging to the family Nototheniidae, the notothens or cod icefishes. It is native to the French Southern and Antarctic Lands, the Heard Islands and the Kerguelen Plateau in the Southern Ocean.

== Taxonomy and etymology ==
Gobionotothen acuta was first formally described in 1880 as Notothenia acuta by the German-born British ichthyologist Albert Günther with the type locality given as Kerguelen Island. The specific name acuta means "sharp" or "pointed", an allusion to its snout.

The common names of this species, 'triangular rockcod' and 'triangular notothen', refer to the triangular shape of the first dorsal fin, which is due to the first spine being distinctly longer than the others and the remaining spines decreasing regularly in length to the last. This acute triangular shape of the first dorsal fin is rare in species of nototheniids.

== Description ==
The distinctive acute triangular shape of the first dorsal fin of this small to medium-sized species of notothen, which is due to the first spine being distinctly longer than the others and the 5-6 remaining spines decreasing regularly in length to the last, is a useful feature in distinguishing this species from its congeners. The gill rakers are short and blunt. The irregularly barred pectoral fins extend to above the 7th to 9th anal fin rays. The pelvic fins do not reach the origin of the anal fin. The faintly barred caudal fin is slightly rounded, with 10 branched rays. The body is generally marbled with three or four short, broad, dark bars on the upper parts of the sides and various irregular dark blotches are also present. A series of small, dark spots may be present on the dorsal fin rays. The upper and lateral parts of the head are dark, with dark spots present. A median dark area and a lateral horizontal line is present on the upper lip, with the line extending onto the lower lip and part of the lower jaw. The maximum recorded standard length of this species is 35 cm (13.8 inches).

== Ecology ==
This benthic species inhabits fairly shallow waters, from the 30 m (98 ft) deep waters shore down to depths of 300 m (984 ft), but this is uncommon; the usual maximum depth this species inhabits is 140 m (459 ft). This species is a predator that feeds on benthic invertebrates, mainly amphipods and isopods, but also polychaetes and unidentified phytoplankton. It is itself preyed on by the gentoo penguin (Pygoscelis papua) and the Antarctic fur seal (Arctocephalus gazella) in the Kerguelen Islands. The black-browed albatross (Thalassarche melanophris) is also a known predator of this species. Absolute fecundity ranges from 41,650 to 86,580 eggs, at least in the Kerguelen Islands.

== Commercial importance ==
This species is of very minor importance to commercial fisheries, with a total of just 2 tons (2.2 tonnes) landed in 2010.
