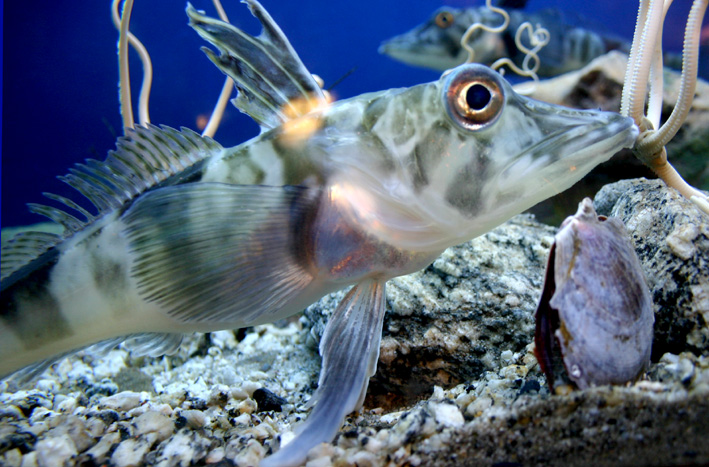

Scientific classification
- Kingdom: Animalia
- Phylum: Chordata
- Class: Actinopterygii
- Order: Perciformes
- Family: Channichthyidae
- Genus: Chionodraco
- Species: C. hamatus

Binomial name
- Chionodraco hamatus (Lönnberg, 1905)

Synonyms
- Chaenichthys rhinoceratus hamatus Lönnberg, 1905; Chionodraco kathleenae Regan, 1914

= Chionodraco hamatus =

Species of fish

Chionodraco hamatus is a species of marine ray-finned fish belonging to the family Channichthyidae, the crocodile icefishes. It is found in the Southern Ocean.

== Taxonomy ==
Chionodraco hamatus was first formally described in 1905 as Chaenichthys rhinoceratus hamatus by the Swedish zoologist Einar Lönnberg with the type locality given as Snow Hill Island in Graham Land on the Antarctic Peninsula. Lönnberg subsequent classified it in a new genus Chionodraco as its only species so C. hamatus is the type species of that genus by monotypy. Some authorities regard C. kathleenae as a valid species. The specific name hamatus means "hooked", a reference to the hooked operculum spines.

== Description ==
Chionodraco hamatus has a robust, backwards pointing spine on its snout. In larger individuals the ridges above the eyes are roughly textured. The dorsal fin has 5 to 7 spines and 38 to 42 soft rays while the anal fin has 33 to 38 soft rays. The overall colour is greyish on the upper body and whitish on the belly with 2 diagonal stripes on the cheek. Mature males have dark fins. This species attains a maximum total length of 49 cm (19 in).

== Distribution and habitat ==
Chionodraco hamatus is found in the cold waters of the continental shelf in Antarctica. This species lives in the demersal zone, and can be found at a depth range of 4 to 600 metres.

== Biology ==
Chionodraco hamatus feeds most on small fish, krill, and fish larvae.

Spawning appears to occur during the summer and females have a fecundity of 2,900 to 4,200 oocytes. In common with many other channichthyid fishes, reproduction in Chionodraco hamatus involves laying eggs in a nest and parental guarding. Male prepares a nest and courts the female. Egg deposition (and presumably fertilization too) takes place at night. Female remains in the nest, guarding and fanning the eggs. Hatching takes place over a prolonged period of time. Male seems not to be involved in the care of the eggs. The larvae have a long pelagic phase.
