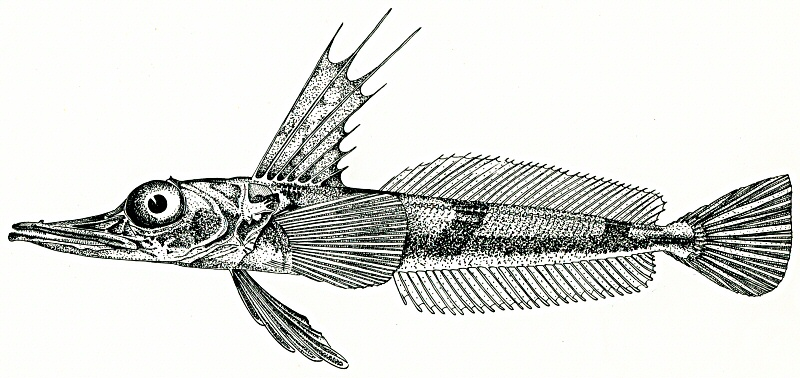
- Channichthys irinae

Scientific classification
- Kingdom: Animalia
- Phylum: Chordata
- Class: Actinopterygii
- Division: Teleostei
- Order: Perciformes
- Family: Channichthyidae
- Genus: Channichthys; Richardson, 1844

Type species
- Channichthys rhinoceratus Richardson, 1844

Synonyms
- Chaenicthys Richardson, 1844

= Channichthys =

Genus of fishes

Channichthys is a genus of marine ray-finned fish belonging to the family Channichthyidae, the crocodile icefishes. They are native to the Southern Ocean.

== Taxonomy ==
Channichthys was first formally described as a genus in 1844 by the Scottish naval surgeon, naturalist and Arctic explorer John Richardson when he described the unicorn icefish (Channichthys rhinoceratus) which he placed in a new monotypic genus. Subsequently, up to nine species have been classified within Channichthys which is what FishBase does while Catalog of Fishes recognises 5 species while other authorities are of the view that the genus is monotypic and that C. rhinoceratus is the only species. The genus name is a compound of channos meaning "gape" and ichthys which means "fish", alluding to the wide gape of these fishes.

Recent research shows that Antarctic icefishes—particularly those of the family Channichthyidae—exemplify an extraordinary adaptive radiation. Museomic studies have revealed that the mitochondrial genomes of several nominal species (e.g., C. rhinoceratus, C. rugosus, and C. velifer) are nearly identical, suggesting that rapid diversification in response to the extreme Southern Ocean environment has blurred traditional species boundaries, a pattern further supported by phylogenetic analyses linking their diversification to the breakup of Gondwana.

== Species ==
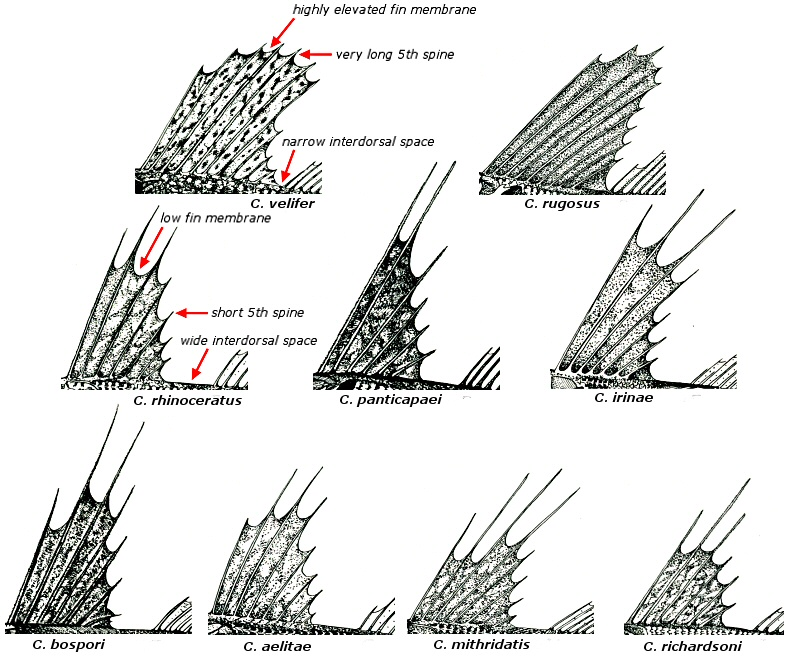
Dorsal fins

The species of this genus are quite similar to each other, and reliable ways of distinguishing them include the shape of their dorsal fins, gill raker count and relative eye diameter to snout length.

- Channichthys aelitae Shandikov, 1995 – Aelita icefish
- Channichthys bospori Shandikov, 1995 – big-eyed icefish
- Channichthys irinae Shandikov, 1995 – pygmy icefish
- Channichthys mithridatis Shandikov, 2008 – green icefish
- Channichthys panticapaei Shandikov, 1995 – charcoal icefish
- Channichthys rhinoceratus Richardson, 1844 – unicorn icefish
- Channichthys richardsoni Shandikov, 2011 – robust icefish
- Channichthys rugosus Regan, 1913 – red icefish
- Channichthys velifer E. E. Meisner, 1974 – sail icefish

== Characteristics ==
Channichthys icefishes may have a backwards pointing spine on the snout and small tubercles on the upper surface of the head. The operculum has 5–7 robust spines with blunt spines on the other opercular bones. They have 2 lateral lines which have bony plates, although they may have other plates on their flanks. In the pelvic fin the third ray is longer than the others, The first dorsal fin is tall and in large specimens the fin rays have small tubercles on them. The first and second dorsal fins are clearly separated. They have a rounded caudal fin. They have a maximum standard length which varies from 3 cm (1.2 in) in C. rugosus to 43.7 cm (17.2 in) in C. mithridatis.

== Distribution, habitat and biology ==
Channichthys icefishes are restricted to the Kerguelen-Heard region of the Indian sector of the Southern Ocean. They are demersal fishes. They are mainly piscivorous but will also eat algae. They spawn in the summer and migrate into shallow water to do so.

== Fisheries ==
Channichthys icefishes, particularly C. rhinoceratus, are caught as bycatch in botton trawls for the mackerel icefish (Champsocephalus gunnari).
