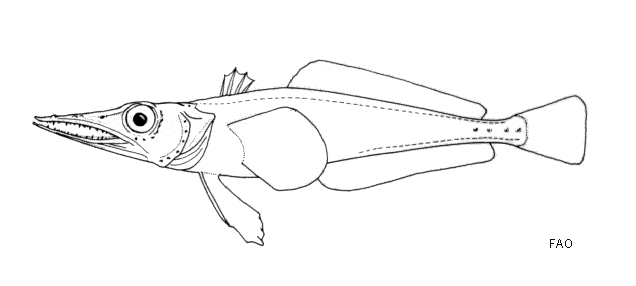

Scientific classification
- Kingdom: Animalia
- Phylum: Chordata
- Class: Actinopterygii
- Order: Perciformes
- Family: Channichthyidae
- Genus: Dacodraco; Waite, 1916
- Species: D. hunteri

Binomial name
- Dacodraco hunteri Waite, 1916

= Dacodraco =

Species of fish

Dacodraco is a monotypic genus of marine ray-finned fish. It belongs to the family of Channichthyidae, (the crocodile icefishes), and its only member is Dacodraco hunteri. This species is found in the Southern Ocean.

== Taxonomy ==
Dacodraco was first described as a genus in 1916 by the English-born Australian ichthyologist, Edgar Ravenswood Waite, when he was describing its only species Dacodraco hunteri. The type locality of D. hunteri is Queen Mary Land, off the Shackleton Ice Shelf at 65°06'S, 96°13'E. The genus name is a compound of dakos which means a "beast that bites" and draco meaning "dragon", a common suffix in generic names of Notothenioids. Waite did not explain the reason for using dakos but it may refer to the single row of teeth in each jaw with a spaced line of large canines to the inside of them. The specific name honours the Australian biologist John G. Hunter of Sydney University who was chief biologist at the main base of the Australian Antarctic Expedition on the Adelie Coast.

== Description ==
Dacodraco has a spine on its snout, but this has been reduced to a small knob or blunt spine. The operculum has an obvious ridge which ends in a flattened spine towards the rear, the other opercular bones do not have spines. There are two lateral lines which do not have any bony plates, the upper and lower lateral lines are present but there is no middle line. The upper and lower jaws are curved so that a gap forms along the length of the closed mouth. The second fin ray in the pelvic fin is the longest. The first dorsal fin is widely separated from the second dorsal fin. The dorsal fins have 2-3 spines and 32-33 soft rays while the anal fin has 29-32 soft rays. This species attain a maximum total length of 29 cm (11 in). The overall colour is reddish-grey with a brown tinge. There are 4 dark cross-bars on body and a fifth dark bar at the base of the caudal fin with a vague dark blotch positioned over the third, fourth and 5th bars. The first dorsal fin and pelvic fins are dark coloured while the other fins are blackish. The juveniles are typically pale but still have 5 distinct dark cross-bars.

== Distribution, habitat and biology ==
Dacodraco is a rare species which is probably circum-Antarctic in its distribution. It is a bathydemersal species which is found at depths between 300 and 800 m (980 and 2,620 ft), although the pelagic larvae can be found at 50 m (160 ft). The larvae spend a long time in their pelagic phase. D. hunteri skeleton is not heavily ossified and its skull has a large proportion of cartilage. The notochord partly persists in adults and the spine has reduced amounts of bone because the centra are not wholly constricted. It is one of the lightest notothenioids and probably spends almost all of its life in the water column. This predatory species has a diet which comprises relatively large individuals of the Antarctic silverfish (Pleuragramma antarcticum).
