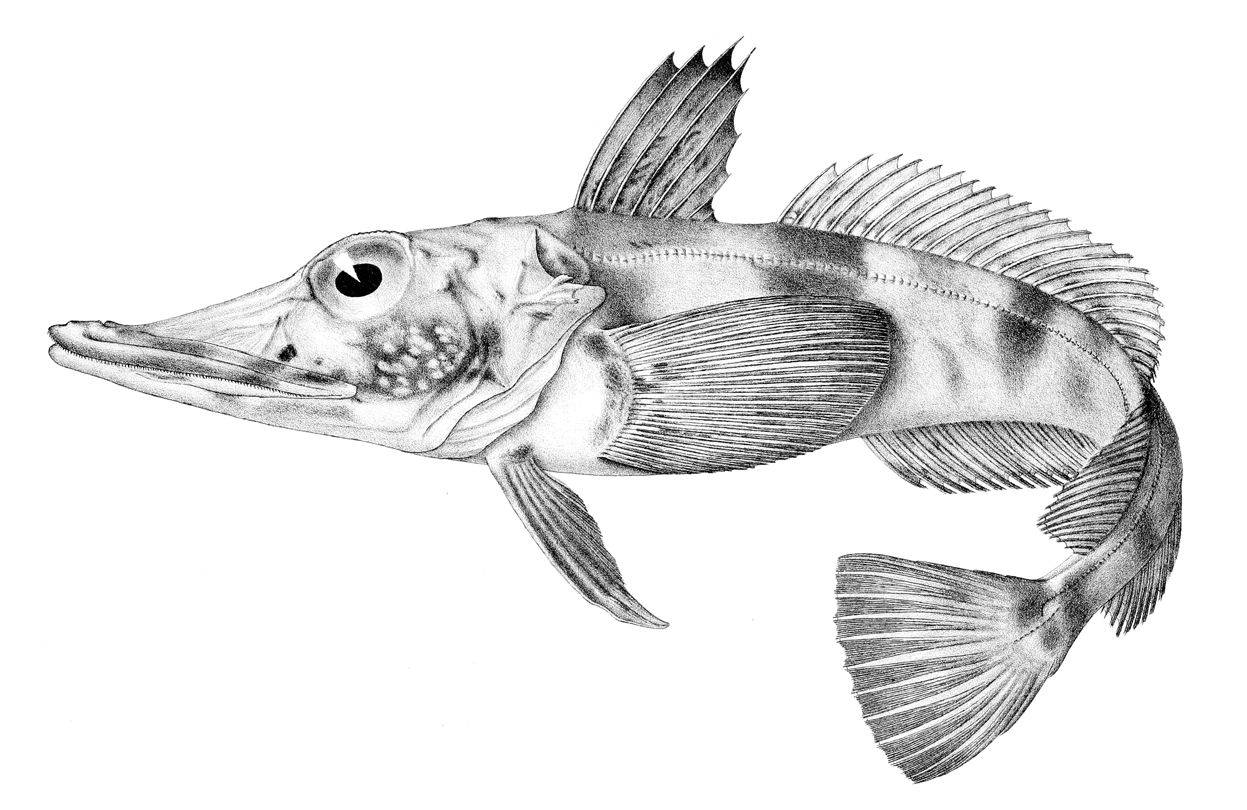

Scientific classification
- Kingdom: Animalia
- Phylum: Chordata
- Class: Actinopterygii
- Division: Teleostei
- Order: Perciformes
- Family: Channichthyidae
- Genus: Chaenocephalus; Regan, 1913
- Species: C. aceratus

Binomial name
- Chaenocephalus aceratus (Lönnberg, 1906)

Synonyms
- Chaenichthys aceratus Lönnberg, 1906; Chaenocephalus bouvetensis Nybelin, 1947

= Blackfin icefish =

Species of fish

The blackfin icefish (Chaenocephalus aceratus), also known as the Scotia Sea icefish, is a species of crocodile icefish belonging to the family Channichthyidae. The blackfin icefish belongs to Notothenioidei, a suborder of fishes that accounts for 90% of the fish fauna on the Antarctic continental shelf. Icefishes, also called white-blooded fishes, are a unique family in that they are the only known vertebrates to lack haemoglobin, making their blood oxygen carrying capacity just 10% that of other teleosts. Icefishes have translucent blood and creamy white gills.

== Taxonomy ==
The blackfin icefish was first formally described as Chaenichthys aceratus in 1906 by the Swedish zoologist Einar Lönnberg with the type locality given as South Georgia Island. In 1913 the English ichthyologist Charles Tate Regan described a new subgenus of Channichthys, Chaenocephalus with the blackfin icefish as its only species, its type species by monotypy. Chaenocephalus is now generally regarded as a valid monotypic genus. the genus name Chaenocephalus is a compound of chaeno meaning "gape", a possible reference to the wide gape which is characteristic of the family Channichthyidae as well as to Chaenichthys, an alternative spelling of Channichthys, and cephalus which means "head", so the name means "gaping head". The specific name aceratus means "no horned" an allusion to the lack of a spine on the snout of this species in comparison to what was then thought to be its congener Channichthys rhinoceratus.

== Morphology ==
The blackfin icefish has an elongated, tapered body with a relatively weakly ossified skeleton. It lacks scales and has thin, highly vascularised skin. Its body structure makes it extremely vulnerable to injury. Its head and snout are depressed with a single nostril on either side of the head, and a large mouth with small teeth.

This species can range from grey to brown in colour and can have dark vertical stripes along its side. It has two dorsal fins and thickened skin on the pelvic fins, which is thought to be an adaptation to allow the fish to rest on the ocean substrate, as it lacks a swim bladder to maintain buoyancy. This species is sexually dimorphic, with the males having longer and darker first dorsal fins than females. At sexual maturation, females (48–49 cm) are significantly larger than males (34–40 cm), and spawning females are larger than non-spawning females.

== Habitat ==
The blackfin icefish is known to reside in the Southern Ocean around Antarctica. Most research on the blackfin icefish has been carried out around the Scotia Arc, encompassing South Georgia, the South Shetland Islands, Bouvet Island, the South Orkney Islands, and the Antarctic Peninsula.

The ocean temperature in these regions usually remains within a few degrees of the freezing point of seawater, −2 °C (28 °F). Consequently, the blackfin icefish is a stenothermal ectotherm, meaning it has a narrow thermal tolerance range and a low upper thermal limit. The Southern Ocean has a high oxygen content, which allows the blackfin icefish to survive without haemoglobin.

Blackfin icefish are typically found at depths of 0–770 m, depending on their life stage. Larvae and juveniles tend to be more active in the water column but are typically found closer to the shore, while adults more often exhibit benthic swimming behaviour.

== Evolution ==
There are at least 16 known species of icefish, and they are thought to make up a monophyletic group. The icefishes likely descended from a sluggish demersal ancestor. During the mid-Tertiary period, a species crash in the Southern Ocean opened up a wide range of empty niches to colonize. Despite the hemoglobin-less mutants being less fit, the lack of competition allowed even the mutants to leave descendants that colonized empty habitats and evolved compensations for their mutations. Later, the periodic openings of fjords created habitats that were colonized by a few individuals. These conditions may have also allowed for the loss of myoglobin.

It is still unknown when the icefish evolved, but there are two main competing hypotheses. The first is that they are only about 6 million years old, appearing after the Southern Ocean cooled significantly. The second predicts that they are much older, evolving 15–20 million years ago. Although the evolution of icefish is still disputed, it is widely accepted that the formation of the Antarctic Polar Frontal Zone (APFZ) and the Antarctic Circumpolar Current (ACC) marks the beginning of the evolution of Antarctic fishes. The ACC is an oceanic current that moves in a clockwise northeast direction, and can be up to 10,000 km wide. This current formed 25–22 million years ago, and thermally isolated the Southern Ocean by separating it from the warm subtropical gyres to the north.

The various lifestyles of icefish are thought to have caused speciation within the family. For example, blackfin icefish adults have a very sedentary lifestyle, which may have geographically isolated them from other members of the family. Other species, such as Champsocephalus gunnari, are more pelagic and seem to have avoided isolation.

== Adaptation ==
The Southern Ocean is one of the most extreme habitats on the planet. Like most other Antarctic notothenioids, the blackfin icefish produces antifreeze glycoproteins in their blood and other body fluids. These proteins reduce the internal freezing temperature, preventing ice crystallization and thus allowing the fish to survive in water below 0 °C.

In addition, icefishes have developed a specialized cardiovascular system to compensate for the lack of hemoglobin and maximize oxygen delivery to tissues. Because icefish blood lacks erythrocytes, it is less viscous and can flow more easily around the body at low temperatures. As a result, the amount of energy expended to transport oxygen is reduced.

Icefish also possess an enlarged, hypertrophied heart, which allows the animal to pump very large volumes of blood at a low pressure and speed. The stroke volume of the icefish heart is 6–15 times that of other teleosts, and the blood volume in general is 2–4 times as large as other teleosts. The blackfin icefish also maintains very high concentrations of mitochondria in its cardiac muscle cells and thin, highly vascularized skin. All of these adaptations allow the blackfin icefish to maximize oxygen delivery and survive without haemoglobin.

== Diet ==
Blackfin icefish primarily eat smaller fish and krill, but have occasionally been found with crustaceans in their stomachs. Younger icefish tend to eat krill, and then switch to mackerel icefish when they grow (about 30 cm). From data collected in different locations, researchers have determined that the blackfin icefish likely feeds sporadically, consuming large quantities of fish and krill at a time, but at irregular intervals. Their lack of haemoglobin supports this behaviour because burst activity would allow them to obtain energy anaerobically, reducing the need for oxygen. While larvae and juveniles are more active in the water column searching for krill, the adult blackfin icefish usually works as an ambush predator, sitting on the substrate until prey swim past.

== Reproduction ==
The blackfin icefish takes between 5 and 7 years to reach reproductive age, and it expends a large amount of energy when it comes to reproducing and parenting. Females typically spawn large, slow-developing embryos that are up to 5 mm in diameter. However, the large yolky eggs mean that females rarely produce over 10,000 eggs per spawning. Males dig shallow, circular depressions on the seafloor and clear the surrounding area of debris for a female to spawn her eggs. The embryos are at high risk of predation because they are demersal, so males spend the months between spawning and hatching ferociously guarding the eggs. This also makes males particularly vulnerable to being caught as trawling bycatch.

Spawning appears to follow a latitudinal trend, with spawning primarily taking place between autumn and winter, but progressively later in the southernmost populations. During spawning season, blackfin icefish tend to migrate closer to shore. Female blackfin icefish are total spawners with determinate fecundity, and typically spawn every year. However, because reproduction requires large amounts of energy and icefish are limited due metabolically to lack of haemoglobin, sexually mature females may skip a season of spawning if food has been scarce or of poor quality. The incubation period can take 2 to 6 months to complete, depending on the latitude (more southerly regions have longer incubation periods). The larvae remain pelagic for 5 to 7 years until maturity, growing relatively quickly at about 6 to 10 cm each year.

== Threats ==
Although blackfin icefish is not caught commercially in direct fisheries, it is often caught as bycatch when fishermen trawl for mackerel icefish, and the flesh is of excellent quality. Even if the blackfin icefish is thrown back after being caught, it has a high mortality rate due to its fragile structure and vulnerability to stress. Additionally, its benthic behaviour makes it more vulnerable to being caught in trawling nets. Researchers are currently working to understand how marine protected areas can be created for this species, and the best ways to handle them to reduce stress and injury.

Another major threat facing the blackfin icefish is climate change. The blackfin icefish can only survive within a very narrow temperature range. This is due in part to the high dissolved oxygen content of ice-cold seawater, which it requires due to lack of haemoglobin. Rising sea temperatures pose a serious threat to this species, and scientists are studying blackfin icefish physiology to see how severely climate change will affect this species, particularly at embryonic and larval stages.
