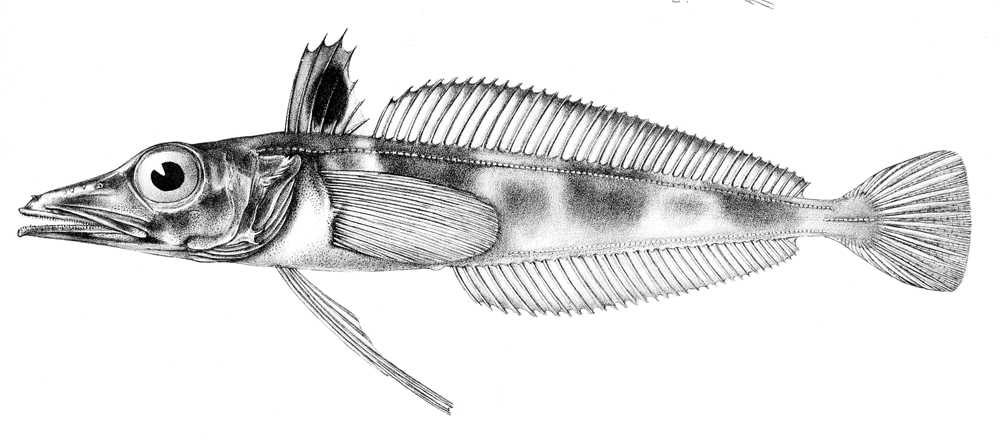

Scientific classification
- Kingdom: Animalia
- Phylum: Chordata
- Class: Actinopterygii
- Order: Perciformes
- Family: Channichthyidae
- Genus: Chaenodraco; Regan, 1914
- Species: C. wilsoni

Binomial name
- Chaenodraco wilsoni Regan, 1914

Synonyms
- Chaenodraco fasciatus Regan, 1914

= Spiny icefish =

Species of fish

Chaenodraco wilsoni, the spiny icefish, is a species of marine ray-finned fish belonging to the family Channichthyidae, the crocodile icefishes. It is native to the Southern Ocean. This species is the only known member of its genus. It is of minor interest to commercial fisheries.

== Taxonomy ==
The spiny icefish was first formally described in 1914 by the English ichthyologist Charles Tate Regan with the type locality given as McMurdo Sound in Antarctica. Regan placed it in the monotypic genus Chaenodraco. The genus name is a compound of chaeno meaning "gape" and draco meaning "dragon", draco is a common suffix in the binomials of notothenioid fishes. The specific name honours Edward A. Wilson who was the second in command of the Terra Nova Expedition, during which type was collected, and who died alongside four other members of the expedition coming back from the South Pole.

== Description ==
The spiny icefish has a spine on the snout and well developed spines on the operculum. The first dorsal fin has 5-8 spines, there are 38-42 soft rays in the second dorsal fin and 32-36 soft rays in the anal fin. The first and second dorsal fins are almost continuous. The pelvic fins have a single spine and 4 soft rays with the outer two rays being the longest. The caudal fin is slightly truncate or rounded. They have three lateral lines but the middle lateral line is confined to the caudal peduncle. This species attains a maximum total length of 43 cm (17 in), although 30 cm (12 in) are more typical. They are pale grey with five dark cross-bars on the sides of its body, often with dark blotches in between. The ventral area is white. There are stripes on the second dorsal fin formed by a series of small, dark spots.

== Distribution and habitat ==
The spiny icefish is native to the Southern Ocean where it occurs in a circum-Antarctic distribution, with the northernmost records from the South Orkney Islands. It is a benthopelagic species which lives at depths of up to 800 m (2620 ft), however, it is common in the shallower waters of the continental shelf, especially on banks less than 250 m (820 ft) deep.

== Biology ==
The spiny icefish matures at 23 cm (9 in). Postlarvae and pelagic juveniles are also found in the upper 100 m (330 ft). The larvae have a long pelagic phase and live nearshore, however, the adults live on the seabed. This species preys on fishes and krill. A study in the Ross Sea in 1984 found Pleuragramma antarcticum and the krill species Euphasia crystallorphias in the stomachs of specimens collected. It is in turn preyed on by penguins and seals.

In the Scotia Sea region, juveniles and subadults of this species are often caught together with krill (one of their major prey items) in late January and February. This species spawns in the austral summer and lays large eggs of up to 4.9 mm diameter. Fecundity of up to 862 eggs is known.

== Fisheries ==
It is of minor importance to commercial fisheries, however, landings in 1979 exceeded 10,000 tonnes (11,203 tons).
