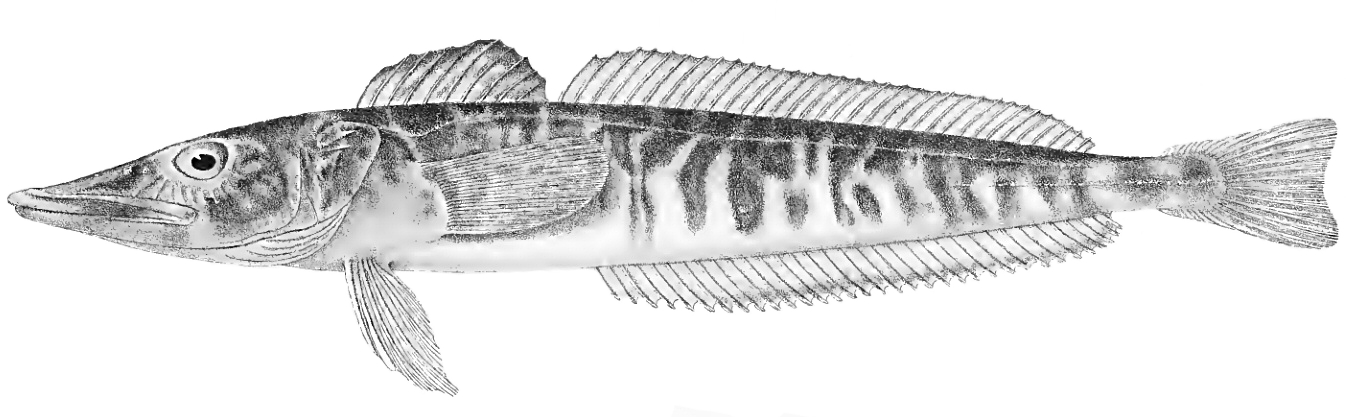

Conservation status
- Vulnerable (IUCN 3.1)

Scientific classification
- Kingdom: Animalia
- Phylum: Chordata
- Class: Actinopterygii
- Order: Perciformes
- Family: Channichthyidae
- Genus: Champsocephalus
- Species: C. esox

Binomial name
- Champsocephalus esox (Günther, 1861)

Synonyms
- Chaenichthys esox Günther, 1861

= Champsocephalus esox =

Species of fish

Champsocephalus esox, the pike icefish or northern icefish, is a species of marine ray-finned fish belonging to the family Channichthyidae, the crocodile icefishes.

== Taxonomy ==
Champsocephalus esox was first formally described in 1861 as Chaenichthys esox by the German-born British ichthyologist Albert Günther with the type locality given as Port Famine in Chile. In 1862 the American ichthyologist Theodore Nicholas Gill placed it in the new monotypic genus Champsocephalus. The specific name esox means "pike", Günther did not explain why but it may be because of the resemblance to the Northern pike (Esox lucius).

== Description ==
Champsocephalus esox has a whitish body, dark brown caudal fins, and dark brown bars (sometimes forming irregular dark blotches connected with yellowish regions) with no scales except on its lateral line.

== Distribution and habitat ==
Champsocephalus esox is found at depths of 50–250 m (160–820 ft) in the oceans off Patagonia, the Falklands and rarely South Georgia. It is the only species of crocodile icefish found north of the Antarctic Polar Frontal Zone, with only 3 specimens reported south of the CCAMLR area

== Biology ==
Champsocephalus esox is a demersal species that reaches 35 cm (14 in) in length and mainly feeds on fishes and krill. A South Georgian study in 1981 collected a specimen with stomach contents of 90% krill (Euphasia superba) and 10% fish.

== Fisheries ==
Champsocephalus esox is of minor importance to commercial fisheries, with catches in 2008 amounting to a total of 90 tonnes. The fish are trawled from January to March, but none are caught in the winter.

== Conservation ==
Champsocephalus esox stocks have declined by 80% along the coast of Chile since the 1980s while the state of the stock in Argentina is unclear as there has been little attempt to survey this population. The IUCN conservatively estimate the population to have suffered an overall decline of 30% over the three most recent generation lengths, i.e. 12-18 years. This species is threatened by climate change leading to warmer water temperatures, mortality as a result of bycatch by artisanal fishers and by invasive salmonids. The IUCN is listed as Vulnerable and state that additional survey work is required to monitor and understand population status wherever it occurs and that research on its life history and its response to warming waters should be undertaken.
