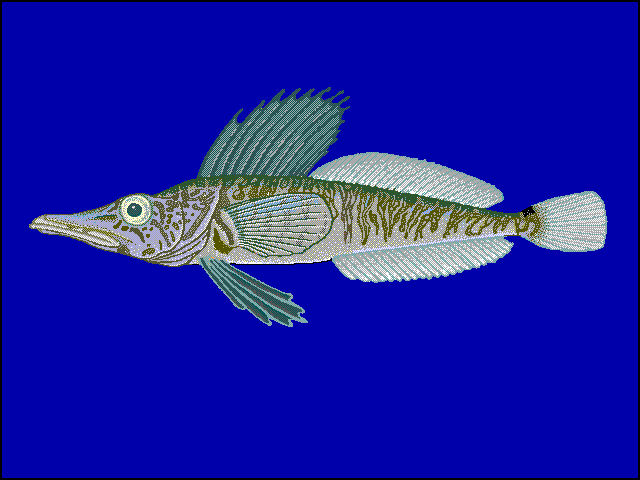
- P. macropterus

Scientific classification
- Kingdom: Animalia
- Phylum: Chordata
- Class: Actinopterygii
- Order: Perciformes
- Family: Channichthyidae
- Genus: Pagetopsis
- Species: P. macropterus

Binomial name
- Pagetopsis macropterus (Boulenger, 1907)

Synonyms
- Champsocephalus macropterus Boulenger, 1907

= Pagetopsis macropterus =

Species of fish

Pagetopsis macropterus is a species of marine ray-finned fish belonging to the family Channichthyidae, the crocodile icefishes. This species is found in the Southern Ocean.

== Taxonomy ==
Pagetopsis macropterus was first formally described in 1907, as Champsocephalus macropterus, by the Belgian-born British ichthyologist George Albert Boulenger, with the type locality given as near Cape Armitage, Ross Island, in Victoria Land. When Charles Tate Regan described the genus Pagetopsis this was its type species by monotypy. The specific name macropterus means "large-finned", an allusion to the large dorsal and pelvic fins, especially those of juveniles.

== Description ==
Pagetopsis macropterus has around 15 narrow dark bars, lighter at the center, on its grayish green body and dark stripes on its cheeks, but has a whitish ventral area. It grows to a maximum length of 33 cm (13 in) and lives at depths of 5 to 655 m (16 to 2,149 ft). The dorsal fins contain 12–15 spines and 27–32 soft rays, while the anal fin has 24–27 soft rays. It has a large mouth, with the maxilla reaching a level with the front third of the eye, and this has two rows of conical teeth in each jaw. The caudal fin is almost truncate but can be rounded.

== Distribution, habitat and biology ==
Pagetopsis macropterus has a circum-Antarctic distribution on the continental shelf and the South Shetland Islands. It is a demersal fish which occurs at depths between 5 and 655 m (16 and 2,149 ft). The defense posture, noted in a study in 1969, is opening the mouth wide, expanding the corner of the mouth and the opercula, erecting the dorsal fin, holding the flared pectoral fins at a right angle towards the body, and bending the body into a semicircle. The same study suggested that this behavior was developed to deter predators such as the Weddell seal (which preys heavily on this species). Adults feed on fishes and krill. It is of no interest to commercial fisheries.
