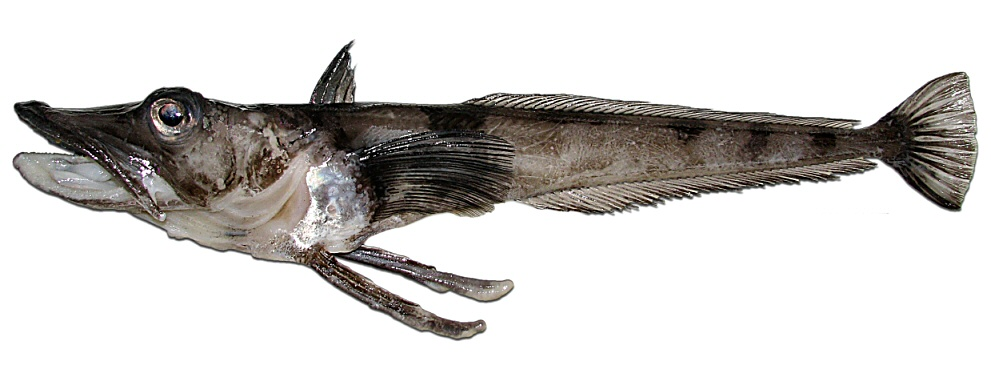
- Cryodraco antarcticus

Scientific classification
- Kingdom: Animalia
- Phylum: Chordata
- Class: Actinopterygii
- Division: Teleostei
- Order: Perciformes
- Family: Channichthyidae
- Genus: Cryodraco; Dollo, 1900

Type species
- Cryodraco antarcticus Dollo, 1900

Synonyms
- Pagetodes Richardson, 1844

= Cryodraco =

Genus of fishes

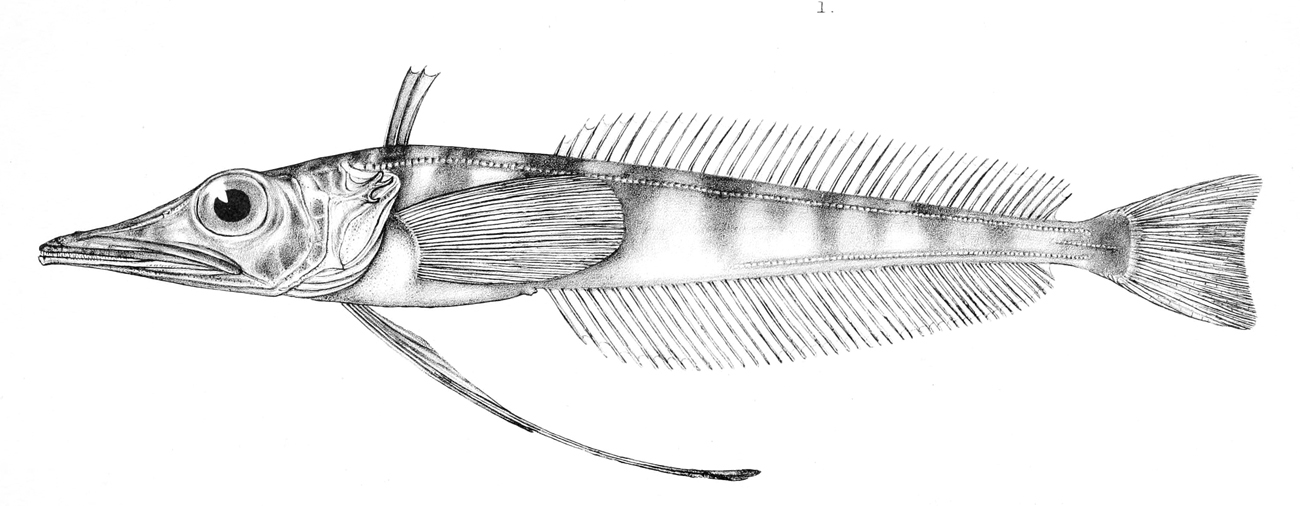
Cryodraco atkinsoni

Cryodraco is a genus of marine ray-finned fish belonging to the family Channichthyidae, the crocodile icefishes. They are found in the Southern Ocean. While C. antarcticus has minor commercial importance, C. atkinsoni and C. pappenheimi are of no interest to commercial fisheries.

== Taxonomy ==
Cryodraco was first formally described as a monotypic genus in 1900 by the Belgian palaeontologist Louis Dollo when he was describing Cryodraco antarctica. Although FishBase uses the genus name Cryodraco, Catalog of Fishes uses Pagetodes as the genus name and treats Cryodraco as a synonym, following Sheiko. The name Pagetodes was applied to a fish which was washed onto the bow of HMS Terror and frozen in place. The fish was carefully removed from the ice, allowing the ship's surgeon John Robertson to create a rough sketch, but a cat took the fish and ate it before it could be preserved in alcohol. In 1844 John Richardson described the genus Pagetodes from Robertson’s drawing in volume 2 of Ichthyology of the voyage of H. M. S. Erebus & Terror. The genus name Cryodraco means "frost dragon". The name Pagetodes means "icebound" or "frozen".

== Species ==
There are currently three recognized species in this genus:

- Cryodraco antarcticus Dollo, 1900 – long-fingered icefish
- Cryodraco atkinsoni Regan, 1914
- Cryodraco pappenheimi Regan, 1913

The genus has been treated as monotypic and the status of C. atkinsoni is arguable but samples of Cryodraco have clustered into two size ranges each containing both sexes which supports the proposition that there are two species. However, the status of C. pappenheimi is less clear; the holotype was deposited in the Natural History Museum, Berlin and has been lost. From descriptions of this taxon it may not even belong in the genus Cryodraco.

== Characteristics ==
Cryodraco icefishes have the spine on the snout reduced to a small knob. There are 3 or 4 spines on the operculum but none on the other operculum bones. There are 3 lateral lines which do not have any bony plates. The pelvic fins are long with the tips covered in thickened skin with the second pelvic fin ray being longer than the others. The first dorsal fin is small and is widely separated from the second dorsal fin. The caudal fin may be truncate or weakly emarginate. The largest species is C. antarcticus which has a maximum standard length of 39.3 cm (15.5 in).

== Distribution and habitat ==
Cryodraco icefishes are found around in the Southern Ocean around Antarctica, occurring on the continental shelf as far north as the South Shetland Islands and South Orkney Islands. They are bathydemersal fishes.

== Biology ==
Cryodraco icefishes are of little importance to commercial fisheries and have been relatively little studied. They are predatory and analyses of stomach contents have shown they feed on fishes and krill.
