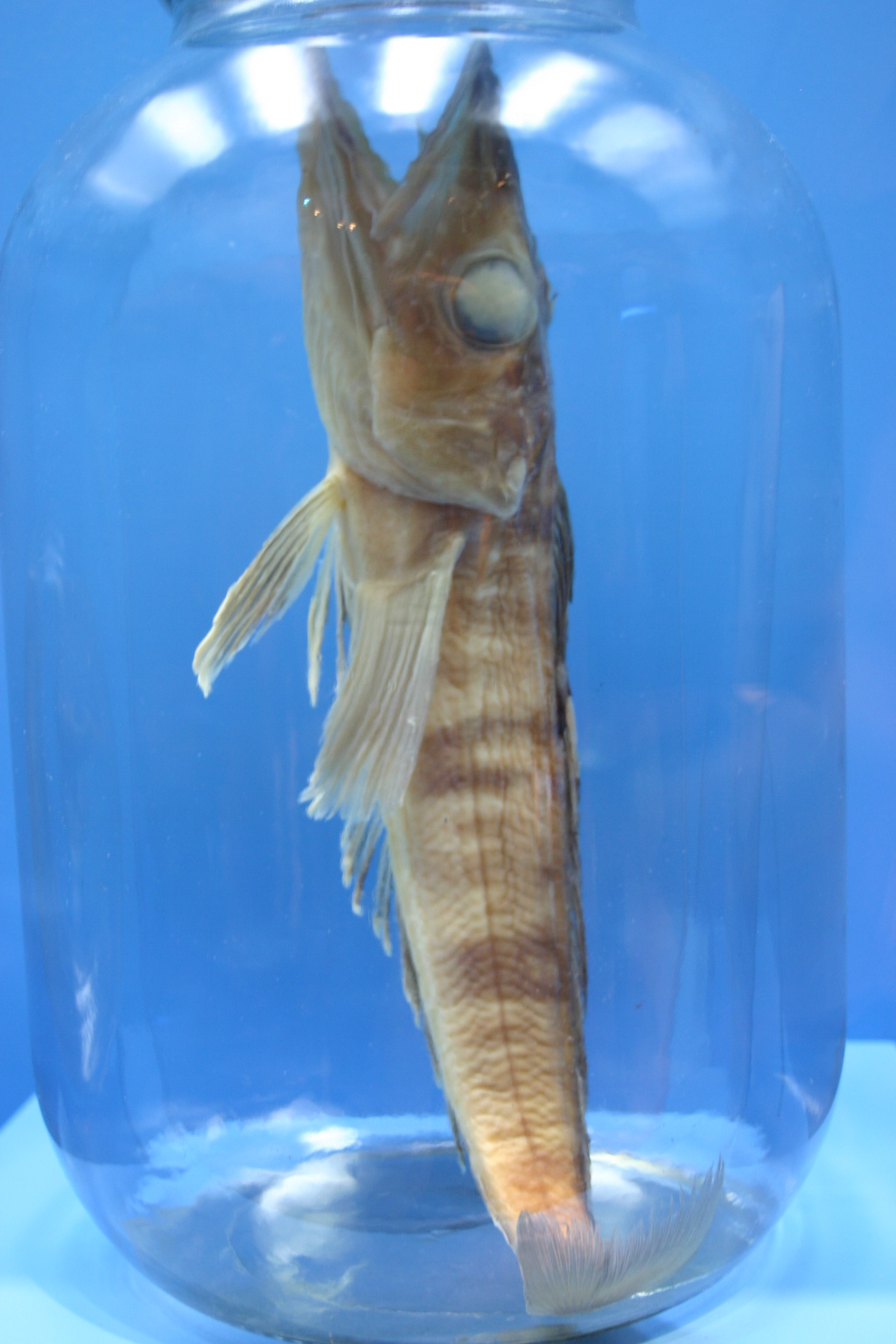

Scientific classification
- Kingdom: Animalia
- Phylum: Chordata
- Class: Actinopterygii
- Order: Perciformes
- Family: Channichthyidae
- Genus: Champsocephalus
- Species: C. gunnari

Binomial name
- Champsocephalus gunnari Lönnberg, 1905

= Mackerel icefish =

Species of fish

The mackerel icefish (Champsocephalus gunnari) is a benthopelagic species of fish found in the Southern Ocean and the southernmost waters of the Atlantic Ocean. They are mainly to be found near Heard and McDonald Islands, Îles Kerguelen and islands in the South Atlantic such as South Georgia and Bouvet Island. The species also inhabits the northern waters of the Antarctic Peninsula. They live at depths of 0–700 metres (0–2,297 ft), but are commonly found at depths of 30 to 250 metres (98 to 820 ft).

== Taxonomy ==
The mackerel icefish was first formally described in 1905 by the Swedish zoologist Einar Lönnberg with the type locality given as South Georgia. The specific name honours the archaeologist, geologist, paleontologist Johan Gunnar Andersson who was leader of the Swedish Antarctic Expedition, on which the type was collected.

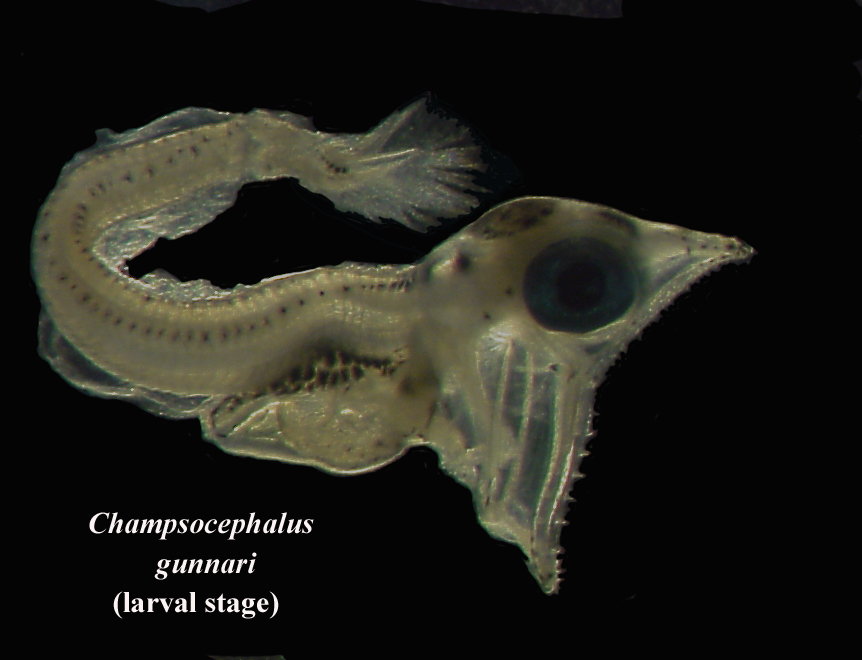
Larval stage

== Description ==
The mackerel icefish has a long, spindle-shaped body with whitish gills and a bluish-silver color. It has an elongated snout and a large mouth with small teeth. The dorsal fins are black in adults and the second caudal fins and anal fins of adult males have distinctive white margins. The mackerel icefish can grow to 66 cm (26 in) in standard length, but is more commonly about 35 cm (14 in) TL. It has a maximum published weight of 2.0 kg (4.4 lb). This species is markedly smaller in the Kerguelen Islands, where they only reach 45 cm (17 inches) TL.

== Ecology ==
This species has a maximum lifespan of 15 years and eats krill (making up more than 95% of the diet in more southerly areas) and mysids. Myctophids are also taken, at least in South Georgia and the Kerguelen Islands.They are in turn preyed on by seabirds, seals and other notothens. This species practices daily vertical migration and is a schooling species. This species, which becomes reproductively mature at 3–4 years old, is a synchronous spawner and spawns in the Southern Hemisphere autumn and winter. Sexually mature males have a significantly higher dorsal fin than females. This species moves inshore to spawn. Females produce 10 000 to 20 000 large eggs that remain on the seabed for about 3 months before hatching. Hatching takes place from August to October in South Georgia and in October around the Kerguelen Islands. The larvae have a long pelagic phase.

== Relationship with humans ==
This species has slightly oily, yet mild-tasting flesh of excellent quality, and is of importance to commercial fisheries, with catches in 2007 amounting to a total of 4364 tonnes (4810 tons). It is targeted mainly using bottom trawling. Due to historic overfishing (more than 168 thousand tonnes of this fish were landed in the year 1978 alone),the United Nations Food and Agriculture Organization (FAO) considers the species "depleted", however, the Marine Stewardship Council has certified the Heard Island Mackerel Icefish fishery as sustainable and well managed. This fishery has been certified since 2006.
