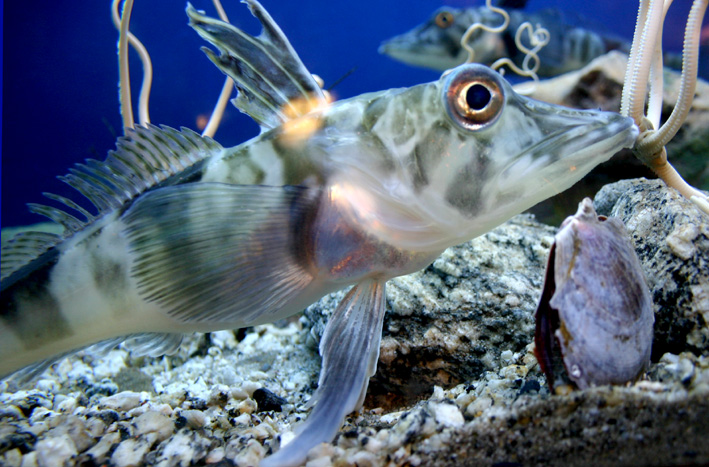
- Chionodraco hamatus

Scientific classification
- Kingdom: Animalia
- Phylum: Chordata
- Class: Actinopterygii
- Division: Teleostei
- Order: Perciformes
- Suborder: Notothenioidei
- Family: Channichthyidae; T. N. Gill, 1861

Genera
- see text

= Channichthyidae =

Icefish

Family of fishes

The crocodile icefish or white-blooded fish comprise a family (Channichthyidae) of notothenioid fish found in the Southern Ocean around Antarctica. They are one of the few known vertebrates to lack hemoglobin in their blood as adults. Icefish populations are known to reside in the Atlantic and Indian sectors of the Southern Ocean, as well as the continental shelf waters surrounding Antarctica. Water temperatures in these regions remain relatively stable, generally ranging from −1.8 to 2 °C (28.8 to 35.6 °F). One icefish, Champsocephalus esox, is distributed north of the Antarctic Polar Frontal Zone. At least 16 species of crocodile icefish are currently recognized, although eight additional species have been proposed for the icefish genus Channichthys.

In February 2021, scientists discovered and documented a breeding colony of Neopagetopsis ionah icefish estimated to have 60 million active nests across an area of approximately 92 square miles at the bottom of the Weddell Sea in Antarctica. The majority of nests were occupied by one adult fish guarding an average of 1,735 eggs in each nest.

== Genera ==
The following genera have been classified within the family Channichthyidae:

- Chaenocephalus Richardson, 1844
- Chaenodraco Regan, 1914
- Champsocephalus Gill, 1861
- Channichthys Richardson, 1844
- Chionobathyscus Andriashev & Neyelov, 1978
- Chionodraco Lönnberg, 1905
- Cryodraco Dollo, 1900
- Dacodraco Waite, 1916
- Neopagetopsis Nybelin, 1947
- Pagetopsis Regan, 1913
- Pseudochaenichthys Norman, 1937

== Diet and body size ==
All icefish are believed to be piscivorous, but can also feed on krill. Icefish are typically ambush predators; thus, they can survive long periods between feeding, and often consume fish up to 50% of their own body length at one time. Maximum body lengths of 25–50 cm (9.8–19.7 in) have been recorded in these species.

== Respiratory and circulatory system ==
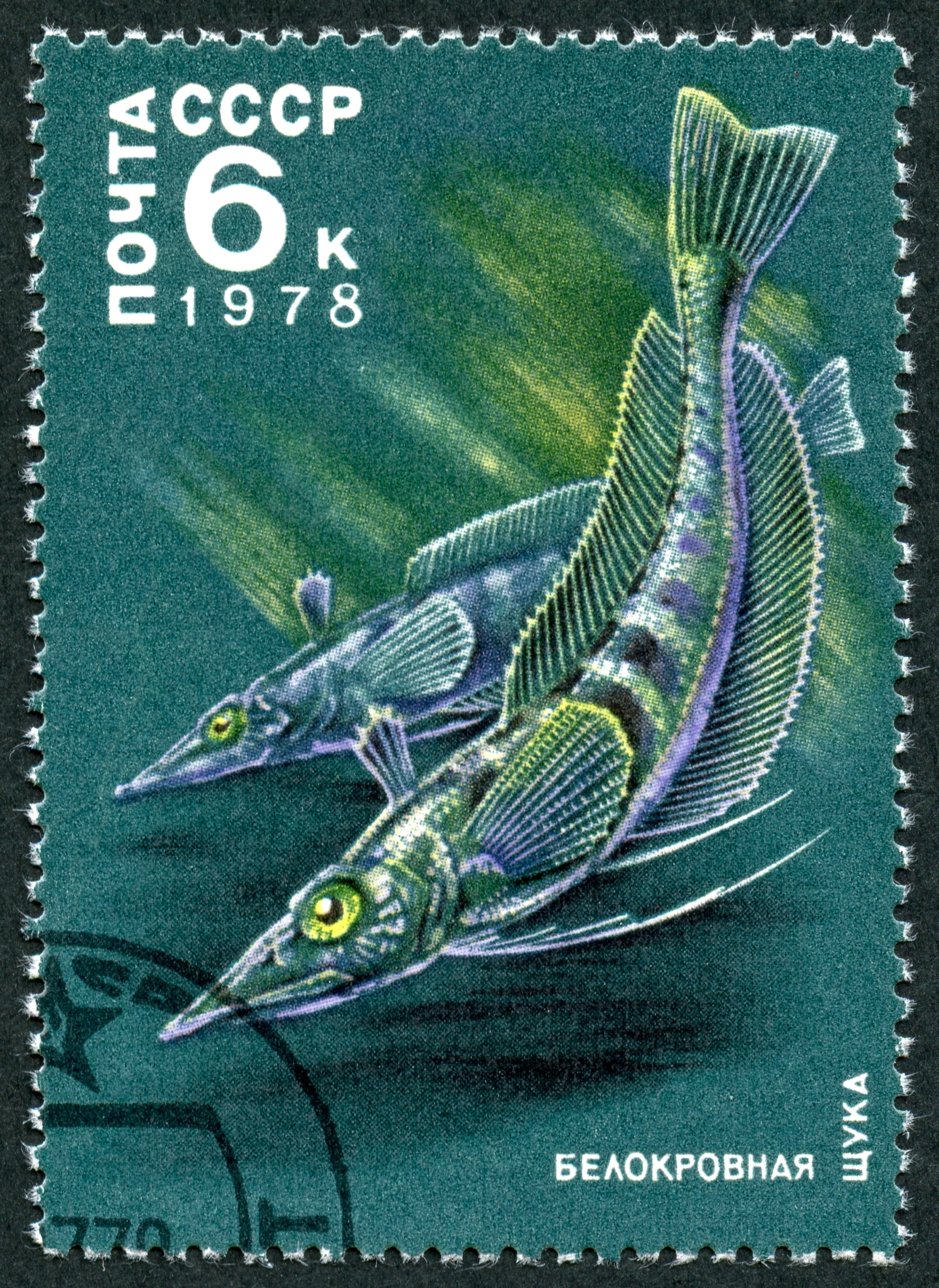
Champsocephalus gunnari on a 1978 Soviet postage stamp

Icefish blood is colorless because it lacks hemoglobin, the oxygen-binding protein in blood. Channichthyidae are the only known vertebrates to lack hemoglobin as adults. Although they do not manufacture hemoglobin, remnants of hemoglobin genes can be found in their genome. The hemoglobin protein is made of two subunits (alpha and beta). In 15 of the 16 icefish species, the beta subunit gene has been completely deleted and the alpha subunit gene has been partially deleted. One icefish species, Neopagetopsis ionah, has a more complete hemoglobin beta subunit, but a still nonfunctional, hemoglobin gene.

Red blood cells (RBCs) are usually absent, and, if present, are rare and defunct. Without a hemoglobin protein, oxygen is transported throughout the body by using oxygen dissolved in their plasma. The fish can live without hemoglobin due to low metabolic rates and an environmental condition of high oxygen solubility in the low temperature waters in which they live (the solubility of a gas tends to increase as temperature decreases). However, the oxygen-carrying capacity of icefish blood is less than 20% that of their relatives with hemoglobin.

Myoglobin, the oxygen-binding protein used in muscles, is also absent from all icefish skeletal muscles. However, in 10 species, myoglobin is found in heart muscle, specifically ventricles. Loss of myoglobin gene expression in icefish heart ventricles has occurred at least four separate times.

To compensate for the absence of hemoglobin, icefish have adapted

- larger blood vessels (including capillaries) and low-viscosity (RBC-free) blood to enable very high flow rates at low pressures.
- greater blood volumes (four times those of other fish).
- larger hearts with greater cardiac outputs (five times greater) compared to other fish.
- hearts lacking coronary arteries and having very spongy ventricle muscles which enable them to absorb oxygen directly from the blood they pump.
- larger cardiac mitochondria and increased mitochondrial biogenesis to facilitate enhanced oxygen delivery by increasing mitochondrial surface area, and reducing distance between the extracellular area and the mitochondria in comparison to red-blooded notothenioids.
- antifreeze glycoproteins (AFGPs) that prevent intracellular ice formation.

In the past, their scaleless skin had been widely thought to help absorb oxygen. However, current analysis shows that the amount of oxygen absorbed by the skin is much less than that absorbed through the gills. The little extra oxygen absorbed by the skin only plays a part in supplementing the oxygen supply to the heart, which receives venous blood from the skin and body before pumping it to the gills.

== Evolution ==
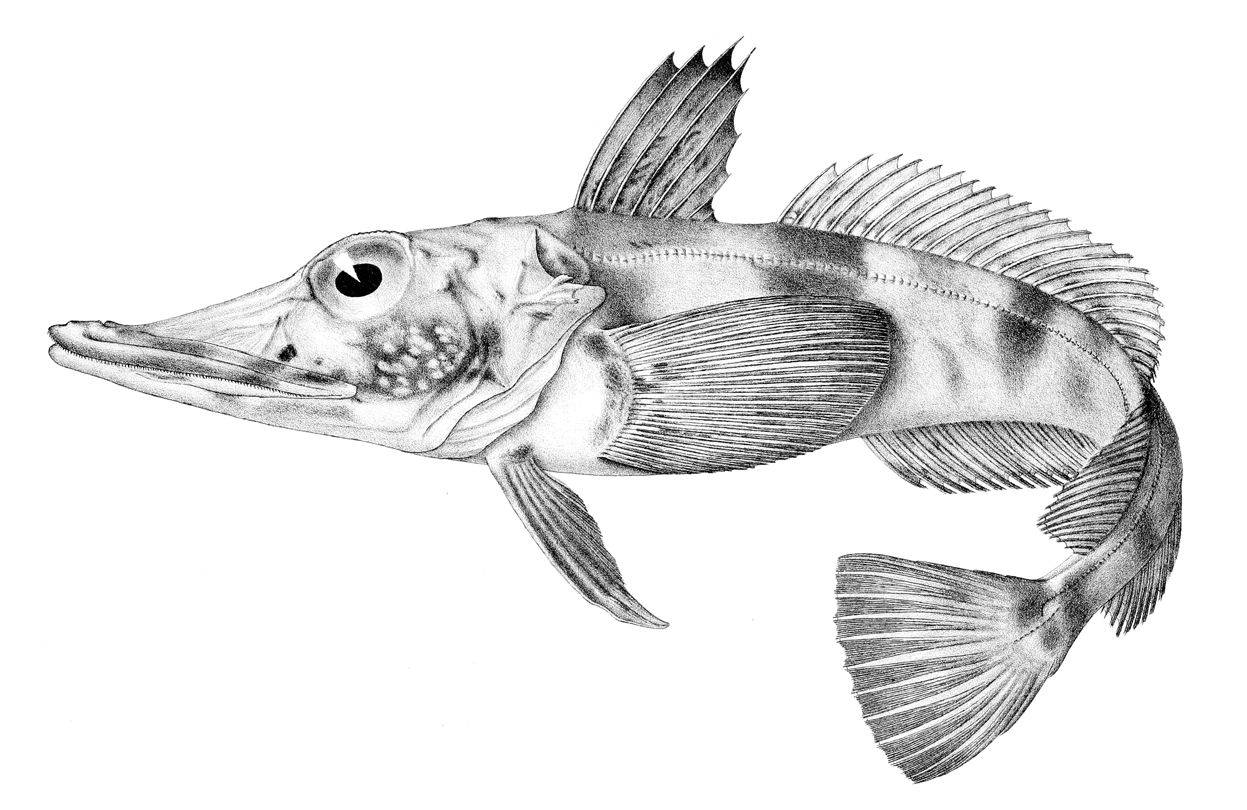
Chaenocephalus aceratus

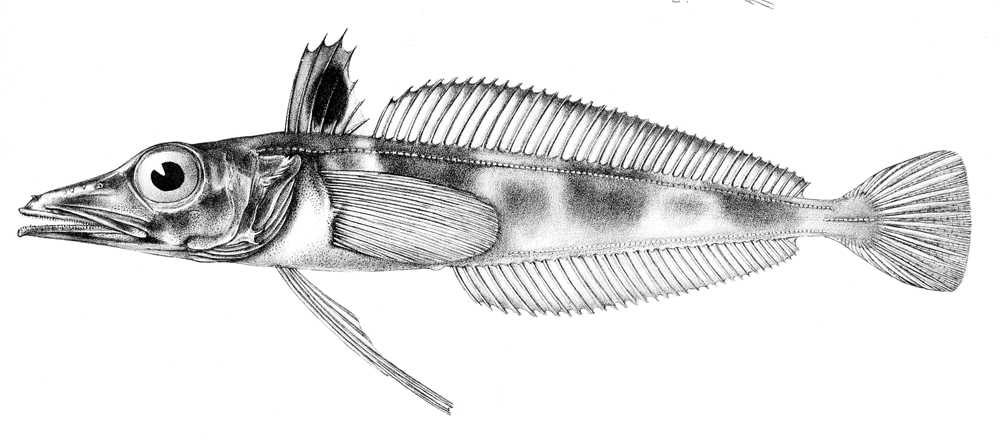
Chaenodraco wilsoni

Icefish are considered a monophyletic group and likely descended from a sluggish demersal ancestor. The cold, well-mixed, oxygen-rich waters of the Southern Ocean provided an environment where a fish with a low metabolic rate could survive even without hemoglobin, albeit less efficiently.

When the icefish evolved is unknown; two main competing hypotheses have been postulated. The first is that they are only about 6 million years old, appearing after the Southern Ocean cooled significantly. The second suggests that they are much older, 15–20 million years.

Although the evolution of icefish is still disputed, the formation of the Antarctic Polar Frontal Zone (APFZ) and the Antarctic Circumpolar Current (ACC) is widely believed to mark the beginning of the evolution of Antarctic fish. The ACC moves in a clockwise northeast direction, and can be up to 10,000 km (6,200 mi) wide. This current formed 25–22 million years ago, and thermally isolated the Southern Ocean by separating it from the warm subtropical gyres to the north.

During the mid-Tertiary period, a species crash in the Southern Ocean opened up wide range of empty niches to colonize. Despite the hemoglobin-less mutants being less fit, the lack of competition allowed even the mutants to leave descendants that colonized empty habitats and evolved compensations for their mutations. Later, the periodic openings of fjords created habitats that were colonized by a few individuals. These conditions may have further allowed for the loss of myoglobin.

=== Loss of hemoglobin ===
Loss of hemoglobin was initially believed to be only an adaptation to the extreme cold environment, as the lack of hemoglobin and red blood cells decreases blood viscosity, which is itself an adaptation seen in other species adapted to cold climates.

In refuting this original adaptive hypothesis, further analysis proposed that lack of hemoglobin, while not lethal, is not adaptive. Any adaptive advantages incurred by decreased blood viscosity are outweighed by the disadvantages that icefish must pump much more blood per unit of time to make up for the reduced oxygen carrying capacity of their blood. The high blood volume of icefish is itself evidence that the loss of hemoglobin and myoglobin alone was not advantageous for the ancestor of the icefish. Their unusual cardiovascular physiology, including large heart, high blood volume, increased mitochondrial density, and extensive microvasculature, suggests that icefish have had to evolve ways of coping with cold climates and the impairment of their oxygen binding and transport systems separately form their low iron environment.

Recent research by Corliss et al. (2019) claims that the loss of hemoglobin has adaptive value to conserve iron which is a limiting nutrient in the environments inhabited by icefish By no longer synthesizing hemoglobin, they claim that icefish are minimizing endogenous iron use. To demonstrate this, they obtained retinal samples of Champsocephalus gunnari and stained them to detect hemoglobin alpha 3'f. They found expression of hemoglobin alpha 3'f within the retinal vasculature of Champsocephalus gunnari, demonstrating for the first time that there is limited transcription and translation of a hemoglobin gene fragment within an icefish, a hemoglobin gene fragment does not contain any iron binding sites.

=== Loss of myoglobin ===
Phylogenetic relationships indicate that the nonexpression of myoglobin in cardiac tissue has evolved at least four discrete times. This repeated loss suggests that cardiac myoglobin may be vestigial or even detrimental to icefish. Sidell and O'Brien (2006) investigated this possibility. First, they performed a test using stopped flow spectrometry. They found that across all temperatures, oxygen binds and dissociates faster from icefish than it does from mammalian myoglobin. However, when they repeated the test with each organism at a temperature that accurately reflected its native environment, the myoglobin performance was roughly equivalent between icefish and mammals. So, they concluded that icefish myoglobin is neither more nor less functional than the myoglobin in other clades, meaning that myoglobin is unlikely to have been selected against.

The same researchers then performed a survey test in which they selectively inhibited cardiac myoglobin in icefish with natural myoglobin gene expression. They found that icefish species naturally lacking cardiac myoglobin performed better without myoglobin than did fish that naturally express cardiac myoglobin and cardiac myoglobin was inhibited, suggesting that fish without cardiac myoglobin have undergone compensatory adaptation to lacking cardiac myoglobin.

=== Environmental reasons for trait fix ===
The Southern Ocean in which icefish inhabit is an atypical environment. To begin with, the Southern Ocean has been characterized by extremely cold but stable temperatures for the past 10–14 million years. These cold temperatures, which allow for higher water oxygen content, combined with a high degree of vertical mixing in these waters, means oxygen availability in Antarctic waters is unusually high. The loss of hemoglobin and myoglobin would have negative consequences in warmer environments.

The stability in temperature may have also benefited icefish survival, as strong fluctuations in temperature would create a more stressful environment that would likely weed out weaker individuals with deleterious mutations.

Although most research suggests that the loss of hemoglobin in icefish was a neutral or maladaptive trait that arose due to a random evolutionary event, some researchers have also suggested that the loss of hemoglobin might be tied to a necessary adaptation for the icefish due to limited iron availability in ocean environments. Through hemoglobin loss, icefish may minimize their iron requirements, which could have helped the icefish survive 8.5 million years ago when Antarctic diversity plummeted dramatically.

=== Cardiovascular physiology reasons for trait fix ===
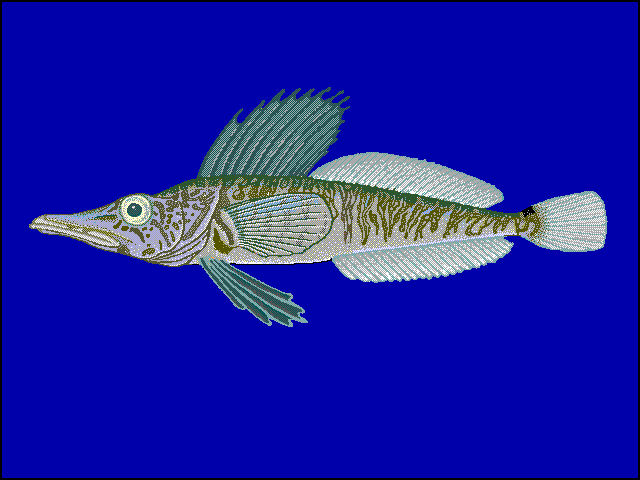
Pagetopsis macropterus

While emphasis is often placed on the roles of hemoglobin and myoglobin in oxygen delivery and use, recent studies have found that both proteins are also involved in the process of breaking down nitric oxide. This means that when icefish lost hemoglobin and myoglobin, it did not just mean a decreased ability to transport oxygen, but it also meant that total nitric oxide levels were elevated. Nitric oxide plays a role in regulating various cardiovascular processes in icefish, such as the dilation of branchial vasculature (blood vessels involved in gill function), cardiac stroke volume, and power output. The presence of nitric oxide also can increase angiogenesis, mitochondrial biogenesis, and cause muscle hypertrophy; all traits characteristics of icefish. The similarity between nitric oxide-mediated trait expression and the unusual cardiovascular traits of icefish suggests that while these abnormal traits have evolved over time, much of these traits were simply an immediate physiological response to heightened levels of nitric oxide, which may in turn have led to a process of homeostatic evolution. In addition, heightened levels of nitric oxide, an inevitable consequence following loss of hemoglobin and myoglobin, may have provided an automatic positive compensation for a decreased oxygen transport system without hemoglobin and myoglobin, thereby providing a grace period for the fixation's less-than-desirable genetic traits: the loss of hemoglobin and myoglobin.
