= N. neglecta =

N. neglecta may refer to:

- Notelaea neglecta, P.S.Green, a plant species in the genus Notelaea found in Australia
- Notothenia neglecta, Nybelin, 1951, the yellowbelly rockcod, a fish species in the genus Notothenia

== Synonyms ==
- Nepenthes neglecta, a synonym for Nepenthes × sharifah-hapsahii, a plant natural hybrid between N. gracilis and N. mirabilis
- Noctua neglecta, a synonym for Xestia castanea, a moth species

== See also ==
- Neglecta (disambiguation)
