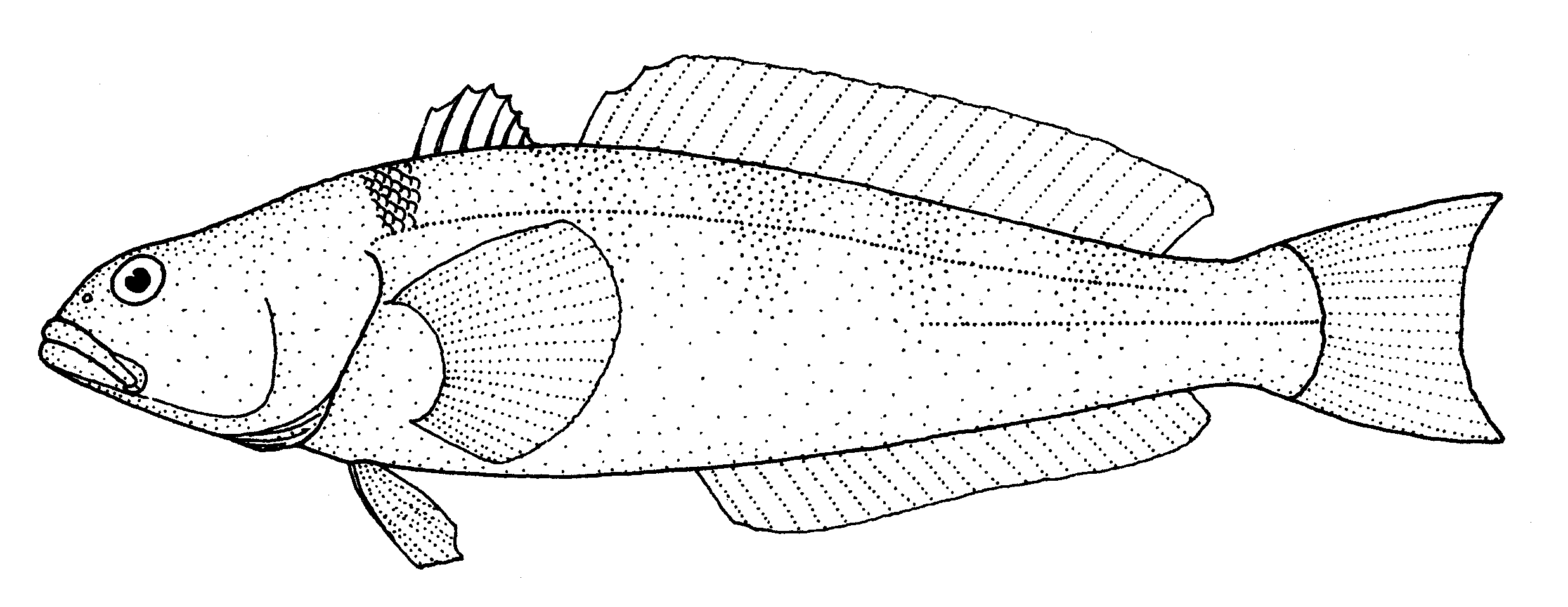
- Drawing by Dr Tony Ayling

Scientific classification
- Kingdom: Animalia
- Phylum: Chordata
- Class: Actinopterygii
- Order: Perciformes
- Family: Nototheniidae
- Genus: Notothenia
- Species: N. microlepidota

Binomial name
- Notothenia microlepidota Hutton, 1875

Synonyms
- Paranotothenia microlepidota (Hutton, 1875)

= Notothenia microlepidota =

Species of fish

Notothenia microlepidota, the black cod or small-scaled cod, is a species of marine ray-finned fish, belonging to the family Nototheniidae, the notothens or cod icefishes. It is native to the Pacific waters around New Zealand and Macquarie Island. This species can reach a total length of 70 cm (28 in). It is a commercially important species.

== Taxonomy ==
Notothenia microlepidota was first formally described in 1875 by the English-born New Zealand scientist Frederick Wollaston Hutton with the type locality given as Dunedin and Dunedin and Moeraki in New Zealand. The specific name microlepidota means "small scaled" which is thought to be a reference to its small, numerous scales when compared to N. angustata which Wollaston described in the same paper.

== Description ==
Notothenia microlepidota juveniles have a silvery appearance and their caudal fin is clearly forked. The adults have a less obviously forked caudal fin. The colour of the body is silver, yellow and reddish-brown. The body is covered in very small scales and there are two lateral lines which have a considerable overlap. The shortbased first dorsal fin has 6-7 spines, the second dorsal fin has 27-28 soft rays while the anal fin has 23-24 soft rays. This species attains a maximum total length of 70 cm (28 in).

== Distribution and habitat ==
Notothenia microlepidota is restricted to New Zealand and Macquarie Island in the southwestern Pacific Ocean. They have been found in depths of a few metres off Campbell Island and have been trawled at 1,000 m (3,300 ft) offshore.

== Biology ==
In the Campbell Plateau, salps are the most important prey, followed by amphipods(particularly Parathemisto gaudichaudii) and percophidids. Crabs such as the portunid crab Nectocarcinus bennetti are also important prey. These prey items imply benthic feeding habits, typical for notothenids.

Being a subantarctic species, the black cod has special adaptations such as antifreeze proteins in its blood, as well as adipose tissues to offset its lack of a swim bladder, giving it neutral buoyancy. The sablefish, Anoplopoma fimbria, is occasionally called black cod, as well, but it is not a true cod. In New Zealand, the Maori cod is also known as "black cod". They are a common prey item of seals.
