= Māori chief =

Maori chief may refer to:

- Rangatira, a hereditary chieftain in Māori culture
- Notothenia angustata, a species of fish often referred to by the common name "Maori chief"
- Paranotothenia magellanica, a species of fish infrequently referred to by the common name "Maori chief"
