= Black cod =

Black cod is a common name for several ray-finned fishes, none closely related to the true cods of order Gadiformes, family Gadidae:

- Order Scorpaeniformes
  - Family Anoplopomatidae
    - Anoplopoma fimbria, native to the North Pacific, known as black cod or sablefish in North America
- Order Perciformes
  - Family Serranidae "groupers"
    - Epinephelus daemelii, native to Australia and New Zealand, known as black cod in Australia
  - Family Nototheniidae "cod icefishes"
    - Notothenia microlepidota, native to New Zealand and Macquarie Island, known as black cod in New Zealand
    - Paranotothenia magellanica, native to the Southern Ocean, known as black cod in New Zealand
