= List of things named after Ferdinand Magellan =

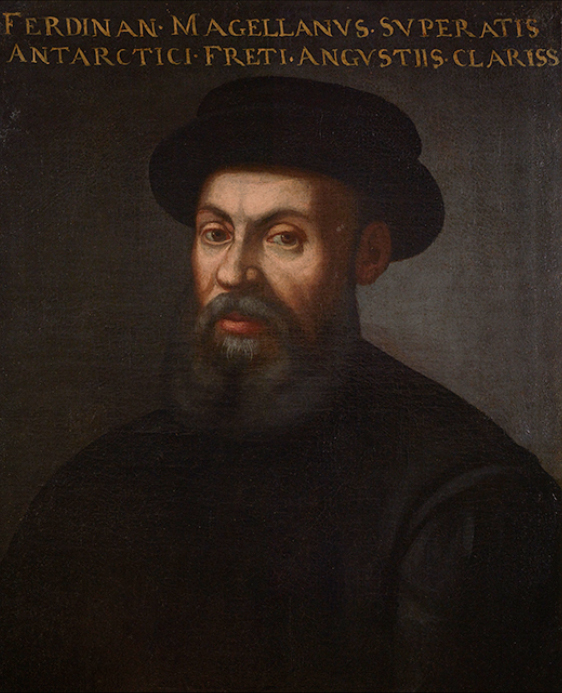
Ferdinand Magellan (1480–1521)

The Portuguese explorer Ferdinand Magellan (1480–1521) is known for leading the first circumnavigation around the Earth. Over 20 things have been named in his honor, including natural phenomena which he was the first European to observe, such as the Strait of Magellan, and the Magellanic penguin. In other cases, modern entities (such as NASA's Magellan probe) have been named after Magellan in reference to his navigational skill and exploration of uncharted lands.

== Astronomy ==
=== Celestial objects ===
- Magelhaens (Martian crater), named in 1976
- Magelhaens (lunar crater), named in 1935
- The Magellanic Clouds, two irregular dwarf galaxies visible in the southern celestial hemisphere. The diary of Antonio Pigafetta, the chronicler of Magellan's expedition, contains one of the first European descriptions of the clouds. However, referring to them as Magellanic Clouds did not become popular until much later. The first instance of the term recorded in the Oxford English Dictionary is from a 1678 volume of Philosophical Transactions.
- 4055 Magellan, an asteroid discovered in 1985
- Magellanic spiral, a type of small galaxy
- Magellanic Catalogue of Stars

=== Instruments ===
- Magellan (spacecraft), a probe launched by NASA in 1989 to map the surface of Venus
- Magellan Telescopes, two large optical telescopes located at Las Campanas Observatory in Chile
- Giant Magellan Telescope an extremely large telescope under construction, also at Las Campanas Observatory, expected to be completed in 2025

== Place names ==
=== Geographical sites ===
- Strait of Magellan, a passage from the Atlantic to the Pacific Ocean through the southern tip of South America, discovered and crossed by Magellan in 1520. At the time, a Magellan referred to it as Estrecho de Todos los Santos (Strait of All Saints), but within seven years, it was being called Estrecho de Magallanes in honor of Magellan.
  - Magallanes Region, region of Chile
- Magellanica, also known as Terra Australis, a southern continent (incorrectly) hypothesized to exist, appearing on many European maps between the 15th and 18th centuries
- Magellan Bay on Mactan Island (the site of Magellan's death)
- The name "Pacific Ocean" was coined by Magellan. Until the eighteenth century, the ocean was also often referred to as the Sea of Magellan
- Magellan Seamounts - Range in North West Pacific Ocean west of Marshall Islands.
- Magellan Rise - Oceanic Plateau east of the Marshall Islands
- North Magellan Rise - Ocean floor feature south west of Hawaii and east of the Marshall Islands
- Magellanic Steppe, 7th largest desert in the world, see Patagonian Desert
- Magellanic Straits, a sea passageway at the tip of South America, see Strait of Magellan
- Magellanic subpolar forests, an ecoregion of southernmost Chile and Argentina
- Mount Magellan Mount Magellan (New Zealand) a 3049m peak in New Zealand.

=== Place names (cities, municipalities, streets etc.) ===
- Magallanes, Cavite in the Philippines
- Magallanes, Agusan del Norte in the Philippines
- Magallanes, Sorsogon in the Philippines
- Magallanes St. in Intramuros, Philippines
- Barangay Magallanes in Makati, Philippines
- Magallanes Interchange in Makati, Philippines
- Magallanes Village in Makati, Philippines
- Magallanes station
- Magallanes Department, Santa Cruz Province in Argentina
- Magallanes y la Antártica Chilena Region in Chile
- Magallanes Province, within this region
- Magallanes, the official name of the Chilean city of Punta Arenas between 1927 and 1938
- Magellan Rise, a suburb of Hamilton New Zealand

== Memorials shrines ==
- Magellan's Cross, a cross planted by members of Magellan's expedition in the Philippines
- Magellan Shrine, a memorial to Magellan erected in 1886 on Mactan Island
- Magallanes monument, a monument at Intramuros, city of Manila, the Philippines

== Organisms ==
=== Plants ===
- Carex magellanica, tall bog sedge or boreal bog sedge
- Sphagnum magellanicum, Magellan's peatmoss
- Fuschia magellanica,Hardy Fuschia or Magellan Fuschia
- Patent for a strawberry plant named Magellan
- Zinnia Magellan Coral F1, a dahlia variety

=== Animals ===
- Magellanic horned owl, a large owl south of the central Andes, see Lesser horned owl
- Magellanic Long-clawed Mouse, also known as the Magellanic long-clawed akodont, see Chelemys delfini
- Magellanic plover, a wader shorebird in the extreme south of Argentina
- Magellanic rockcod, a species of cod icefish, see Maori cod
- Magellanic tuco-tuco, a South American rodent
- Magellanic woodpecker, a South American bird
- Ovejero magallánico, Magellan sheep dog, a dog originated in Chile
- Magellanic penguin, a South American penguin first described by Antonio Pigafetta on Magellan's expedition
- The Magellan Birdwing (Troides magellanus), a large butterfly found in the Philippines
- Magellana, a moth genus

== Education ==
- Universidad de Magallanes in the Magallanes Region in Chile
- Sorsogon State University Magallanes Campus

== Sports ==
- The Navegantes del Magallanes (Magellan Navigators), a Venezuelan professional baseball team
- Deportes Magallanes, a football club from Chile
- Navegantes del Magallanes, a baseball club from Venezuela

== Vehicles and other modes of transportation ==
- Ferdinand Magellan (railcar), a railcar used by US Presidents from 1943 to 1958
- CMA CGM Magellan, a container ship
- Chilean corvette Magallanes (1873)
- MS Magellan (ship, 1985), a former cruise ship

== Awards and recognitions ==
- Magellanic Premium, a major prize established in 1786 regarding navigation
- Order of Magellan, an award given by the Circumnavigators Club

== Other ==
- Magellan Navigation, a company producing GPS devices
- Project Magellan, also known as Operation Sandblast, the first submarine circumnavigation of the world, undertaken in 1960 by the US Navy
- The Magellan Billet is a fictitious covert US intelligence agency in the thrillers by American novelist Steve Berry starring Cotton Malone
