= Ferdinand Magellan =

Portuguese explorer (1480–1521)

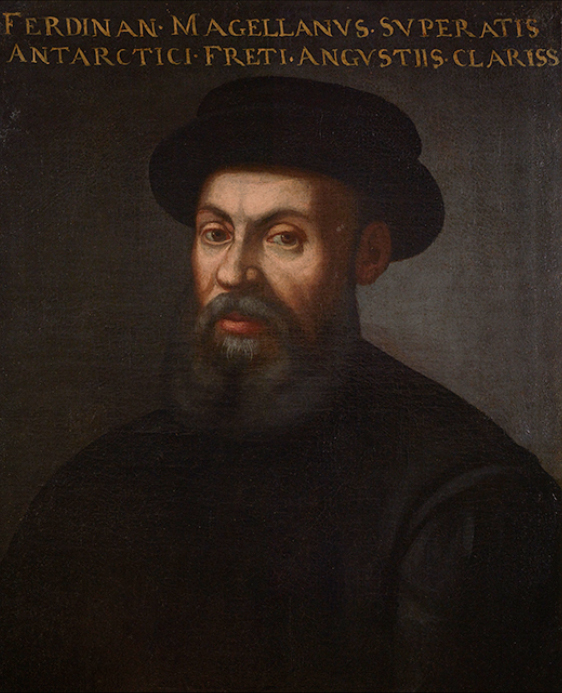
- Portrait, c. 1550–1625
- Born: Fernão de Magalhães c. 1480; Northern Portugal (Note: The exact birth location is disputed. Possible locations include Porto, Sabrosa, Vila Nova de Gaia and Ponte da Barca.)
- Died: 27 April 1521 (aged 40–41); Chiefdom of Mactan (now Mactan, Philippines)
- Known for: The Magellan expedition; Finding the Strait of Magellan; Naming the Pacific Ocean; First documented Pacific Ocean crossing

Ferdinand Magellan (Note: English pronunciation: /məˈɡɛlən/ mə-GHEL-ən or /məˈdʒɛlən/ mə-JEL-ən; Portuguese: Fernão de Magalhães, pronounced [fɨɾˈnɐ̃w̃ dɨ mɐɣɐˈʎɐ̃j̃ʃ] in Portugal, pronounced [feɦˈnɐ̃ʊ̯̃ d͡ʒi ma.ɡaˈʎɐ̃ɪ̯̃s] in Brazil; Spanish: Fernando de Magallanes, pronounced [feɾˈnando ðe maɣaˈʎanes] or [- maɣaˈʝanes].) (c. 1480 – 27 April 1521) was a Portuguese explorer best known for planning and leading the 1519–1522 Spanish expedition to the East Indies. During this expedition, he became the first European to encounter the Strait of Magellan, performed the first European crossing of the Pacific Ocean, and made the first known European contact with the Philippines. Magellan was killed in battle in the Philippines in 1521, but his crew, commanded by Spanish navigator Juan Sebastián Elcano, completed the return trip to Spain in 1522, achieving the first circumnavigation of Earth in history.

Born around 1480 into a family of minor Portuguese nobility, Magellan became a skilled sailor and naval officer in the service of the Portuguese Crown in Asia. However, King Manuel I refused to support Magellan's plan to reach the Moluccas, or Spice Islands, by sailing westwards around the American continent. Magellan then proposed the same plan to King Charles I of Spain, who approved it. In Seville, he married, fathered two children, and organized the expedition. In 1518, for his allegiance to the Hispanic monarchy, Magellan was appointed an admiral of the Spanish fleet and given command of the expedition—the five-ship "Armada of Molucca". He also was made a Commander of the Order of Santiago, one of the highest military ranks of the Spanish Empire.

Granted special powers and privileges by the king, he led the Armada from Sanlúcar de Barrameda southwest across the Atlantic Ocean, to the eastern coast of South America, and south to Patagonia. Despite a series of storms and mutinies, the expedition successfully passed through the Strait of Magellan into the Mar del Sur, which Magellan renamed the Mar Pacifico, or Pacific Ocean. The expedition landed at Guam after an arduous crossing of the Pacific, then reached the Philippines. There, on 27 April 1521, Magellan died in the Battle of Mactan after being shot in the neck with a poison arrow. Under the command of Captain Juan Sebastián Elcano, the expedition finally reached the Spice Islands. The fleet's two remaining ships then parted ways, one attempting, unsuccessfully, to reach New Spain by sailing east across the Pacific. The other ship, commanded by Elcano, sailed west across the Indian Ocean and north along the Atlantic coast of Africa, finally returning to Spain in September 1522.

While in the Kingdom of Portugal's service, Magellan had already reached the Malay Archipelago in Southeast Asia on previous voyages traveling east (from 1505 to 1511–1512). By visiting this area again but now traveling west, Magellan achieved a nearly complete personal circumnavigation of the globe for the first time in history.

== Early life and travels ==
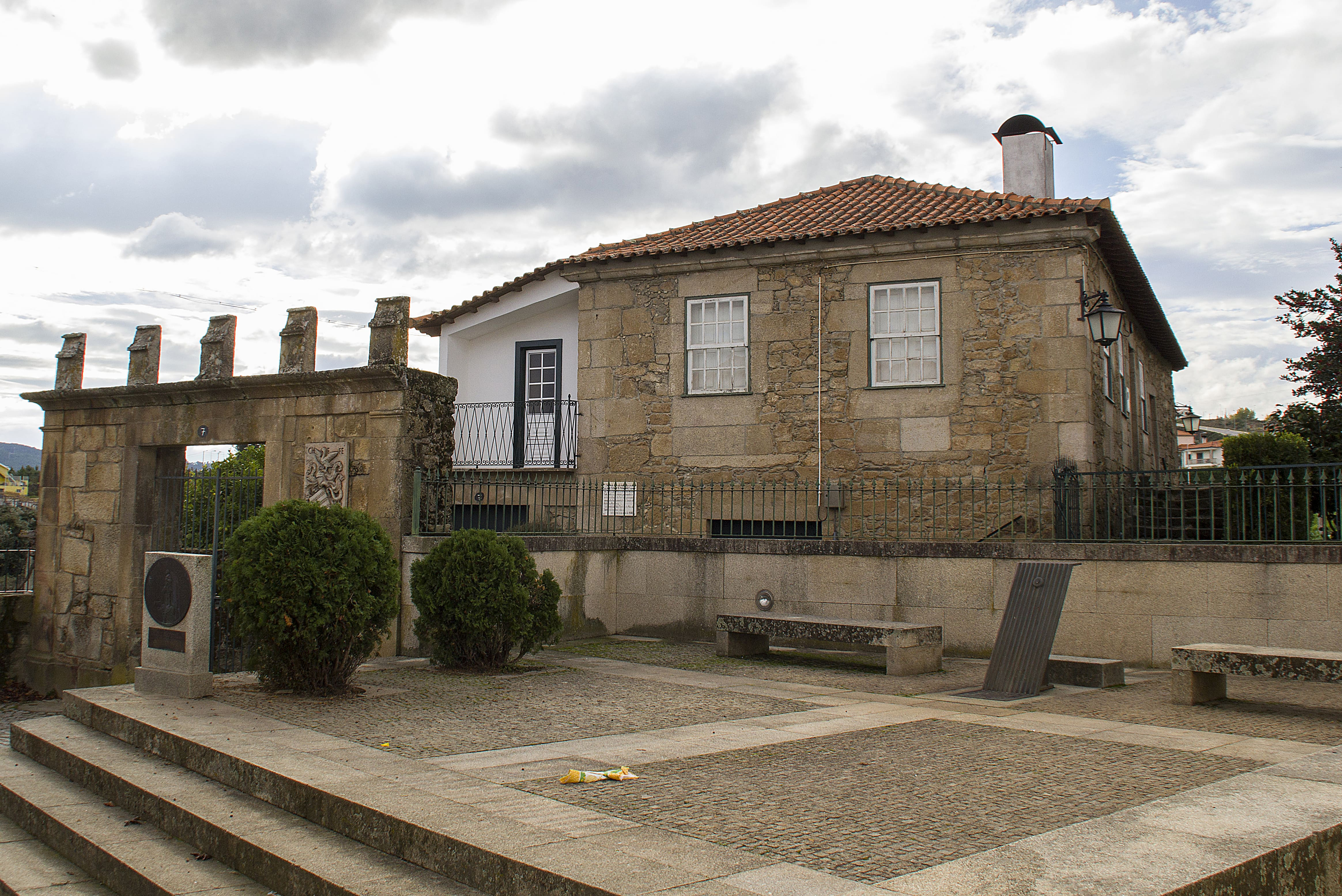
House in Sabrosa, Portugal. In the region, there is a belief that Magellan was born there.

Magellan was born in northern Portugal, possibly around 1480. His father, Pedro de Magalhães, was a minor member of Portuguese nobility and mayor of the town. His mother was Alda de Mezquita. Magellan's siblings included Diogo de Sousa and Isabel Magellan. He was brought up as a page of Queen Eleanor, consort of King John II. In 1495 he entered the service of Manuel I, John's successor.

In March 1505, at the age of 25, Magellan enlisted in the fleet of 22 ships sent to host Francisco de Almeida as the first viceroy of Portuguese India. Although his name does not appear in the chronicles, it is known that he remained there eight years, in Goa, Cochin and Quilon. He participated in several battles, including the battle of Cannanore in 1506, where he was wounded, and the Battle of Diu in 1509.

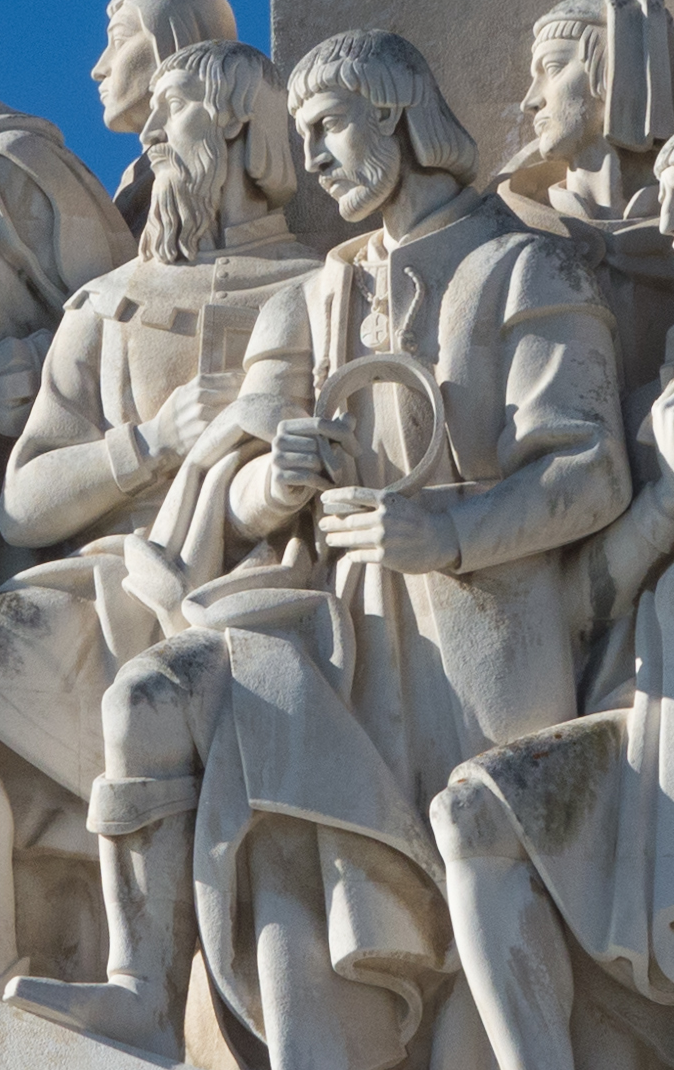
Effigy of Ferdinand Magellan in the Monument of the Discoveries, in Lisbon, Portugal

He later sailed under Diogo Lopes de Sequeira in the first Portuguese embassy to Malacca, with Francisco Serrão, his friend and possibly cousin. In September, after arriving at Malacca, the expedition fell victim to a conspiracy and ended in a retreat. Magellan had a crucial role, warning Sequeira and risking his life to rescue Francisco Serrão and others who had landed.

In 1511, under the new governor Afonso de Albuquerque, Magellan and Serrão participated in the conquest of Malacca. After the conquest their ways parted: Magellan was promoted, with a rich plunder. In the company of a Malay he had indentured and baptized, Enrique of Malacca, he returned to Portugal in 1512 or 1513. Serrão departed in the first expedition sent to find the "Spice Islands" in the Moluccas, where he remained. He married a woman from Amboina and became a military advisor to the Sultan of Ternate, Bayan Sirrullah. His letters to Magellan later proved decisive, giving information about the spice-producing territories.

After taking a leave without permission, Magellan fell out of favour. In mid-1513 he was sent to fight against the Moroccan stronghold of Azemmour and there, in August, he sustained a leg wound resulting in a permanent limp. He was accused of trading illegally with the Moors. The accusations were proven false, but he received no further offers of employment after 15 May 1514. Later in 1515, he was offered employment as a crew member on a Portuguese ship, but rejected this. In 1517, after a quarrel with Manuel I of Portugal, who denied his persistent requests to lead an expedition to reach the Spice Islands from the east (i.e., while sailing westwards, thus avoiding the need to sail around the tip of Africa), he left for Spain. In Seville he befriended his countryman Diogo Barbosa and soon married the daughter of Diogo's second wife, Maria Caldera Beatriz Barbosa. They had two children: Rodrigo de Magallanes and Carlos de Magallanes, both of whom died at a young age. His wife died in Seville around 1521.

Meanwhile, Magellan devoted himself to studying the most recent charts, investigating, in partnership with cosmographer Rui Faleiro, a gateway from the Atlantic to the South Pacific and the possibility that the Moluccas were Spanish under the demarcations of the Treaty of Tordesillas.

== Voyage of circumnavigation ==
=== Background and preparations ===
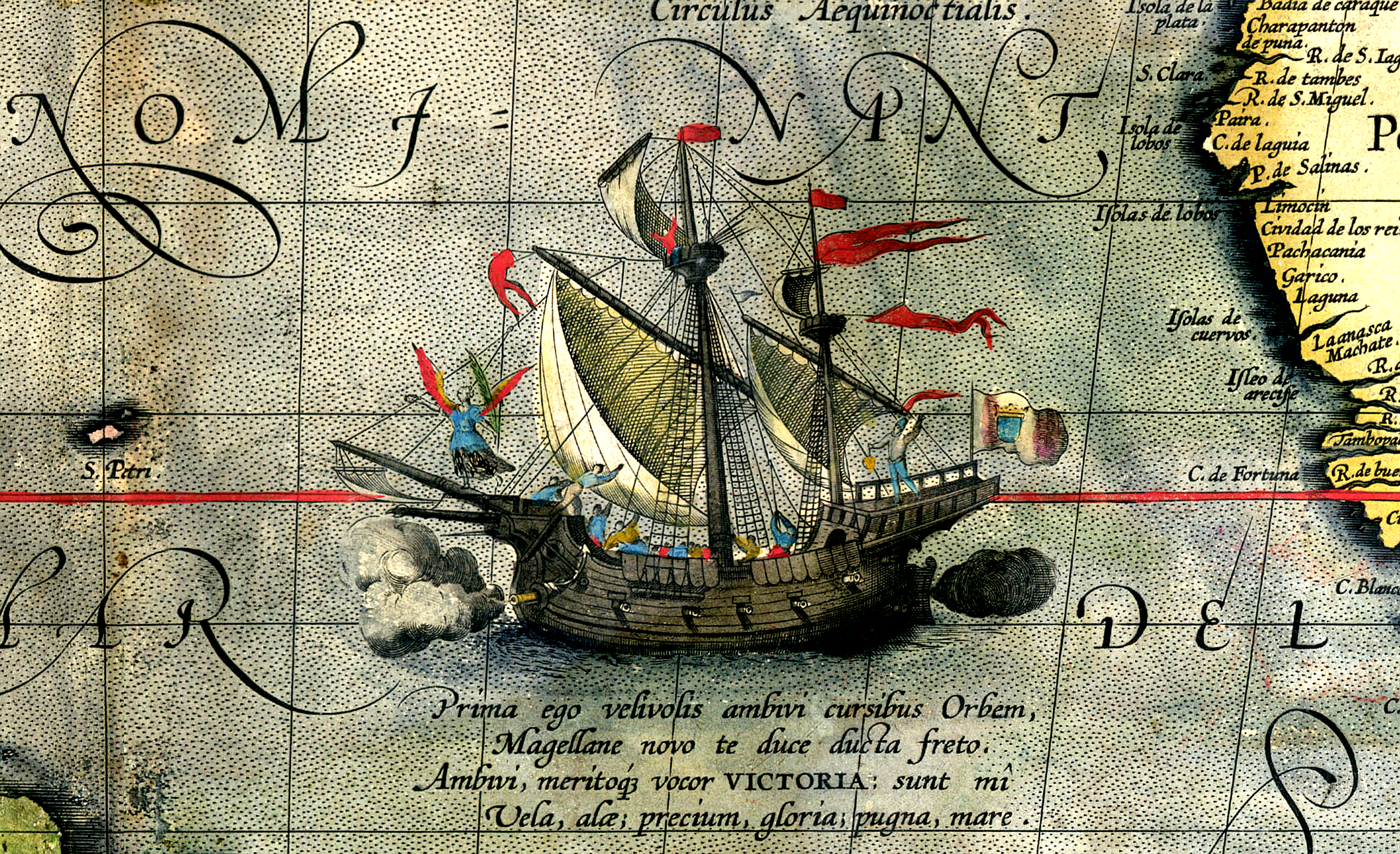
Victoria, the sole ship of Magellan's fleet to complete the circumnavigation. Detail from a map by Ortelius, 1590.

After having his proposed expeditions to the Spice Islands—the Moluccas beside New Guinea—repeatedly rejected by King Manuel I of Portugal, Magellan proposed his project to Charles I, the young king of Spain (later emperor Charles V of the Holy Roman Empire) and became one of his subjects and navigators. Under the terms of the 1494 Treaty of Tordesillas, Portugal was to control the eastern routes to Asia that went around the Cape of Good Hope in Africa. Magellan instead proposed to seek a southwestern passage around South America to reach the Spice Islands by a western route, a feat never before accomplished. Bergreen further states that Magellan claimed to Charles that his Malaccan or Sumatran slave Enrique had been a native of the Spice Islands and used Enrique and letters from Serrão to "prove" that the islands were so far east that they would fall within the Spanish sphere of influence if the world were truly to be divided in half. (The details of the eastern division implicit in the Tordesillas treaty would later be formalized in the 1529 Treaty of Zaragoza.)

King Manuel saw all of this as an insult and did everything in his power to disrupt Magellan's arrangements for the voyage. The Portuguese king allegedly ordered that Magellan's properties be vandalized as it was the coat of arms of the Magellan displayed at the family house's façade in Sabrosa, his home town, and may have even requested the assassination of the navigator. When Magellan eventually sailed to the open seas in August 1519, a Portuguese fleet was sent after him, though it failed to capture him.

Magellan's fleet consisted of five ships carrying supplies for two years of travel. The crew consisted of about 270 men of different origins, though the numbers may vary downward among scholars based on contradicting data from the many documents available. About 60 percent of the crew were Spaniards from virtually all regions of Castile. Portuguese and Italians followed with 28 and 27 seamen respectively, while mariners from France (15), Greece (8), Flanders (5), Germany (3), Ireland (2), England and Malaysia (one each) and other people of unidentified origin completed the crew.

=== Voyage ===
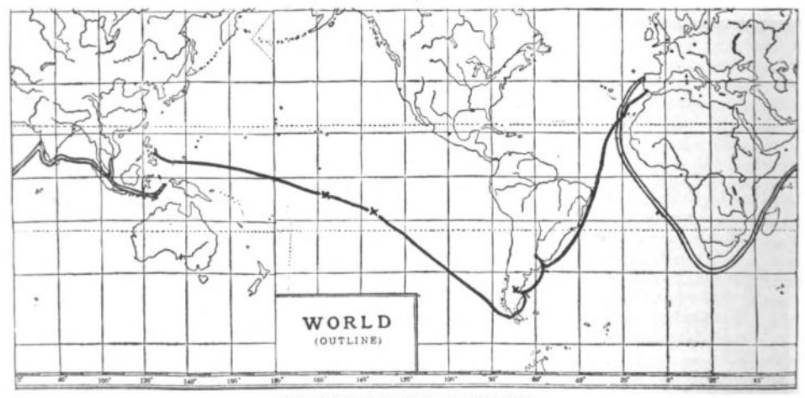
Magellan's voyages; the double line represents Magellan's trip from Portugal to the Moluccas. The single line traces his long, continuous voyage from Spain to the Philippines.

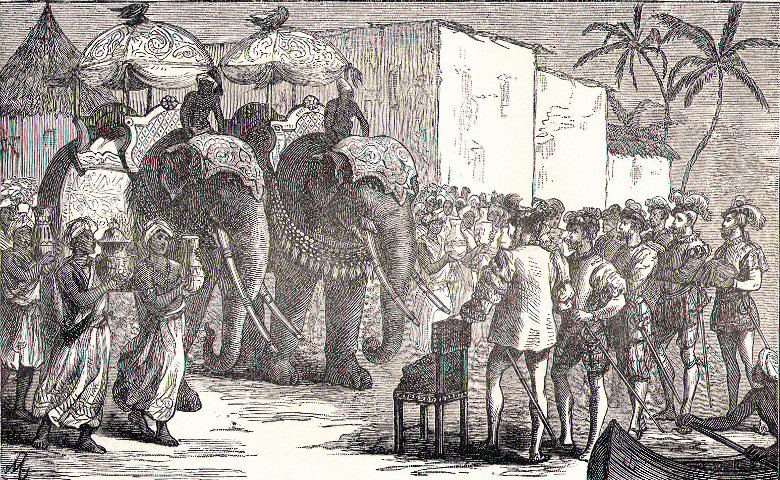
The survivors of Magellan's crew meeting the Bruneian Sultan.

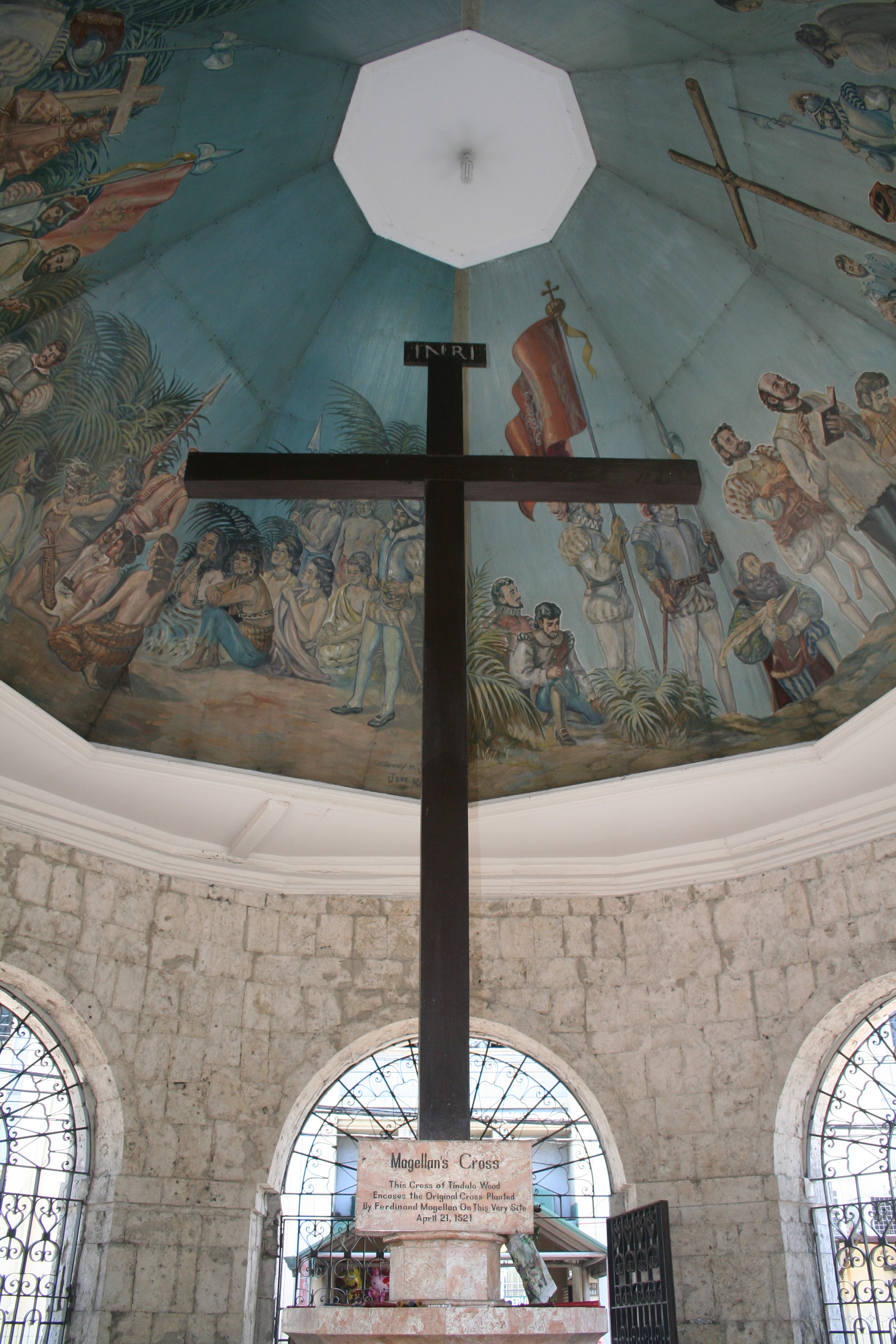
Magellan's Cross in present-day Cebu

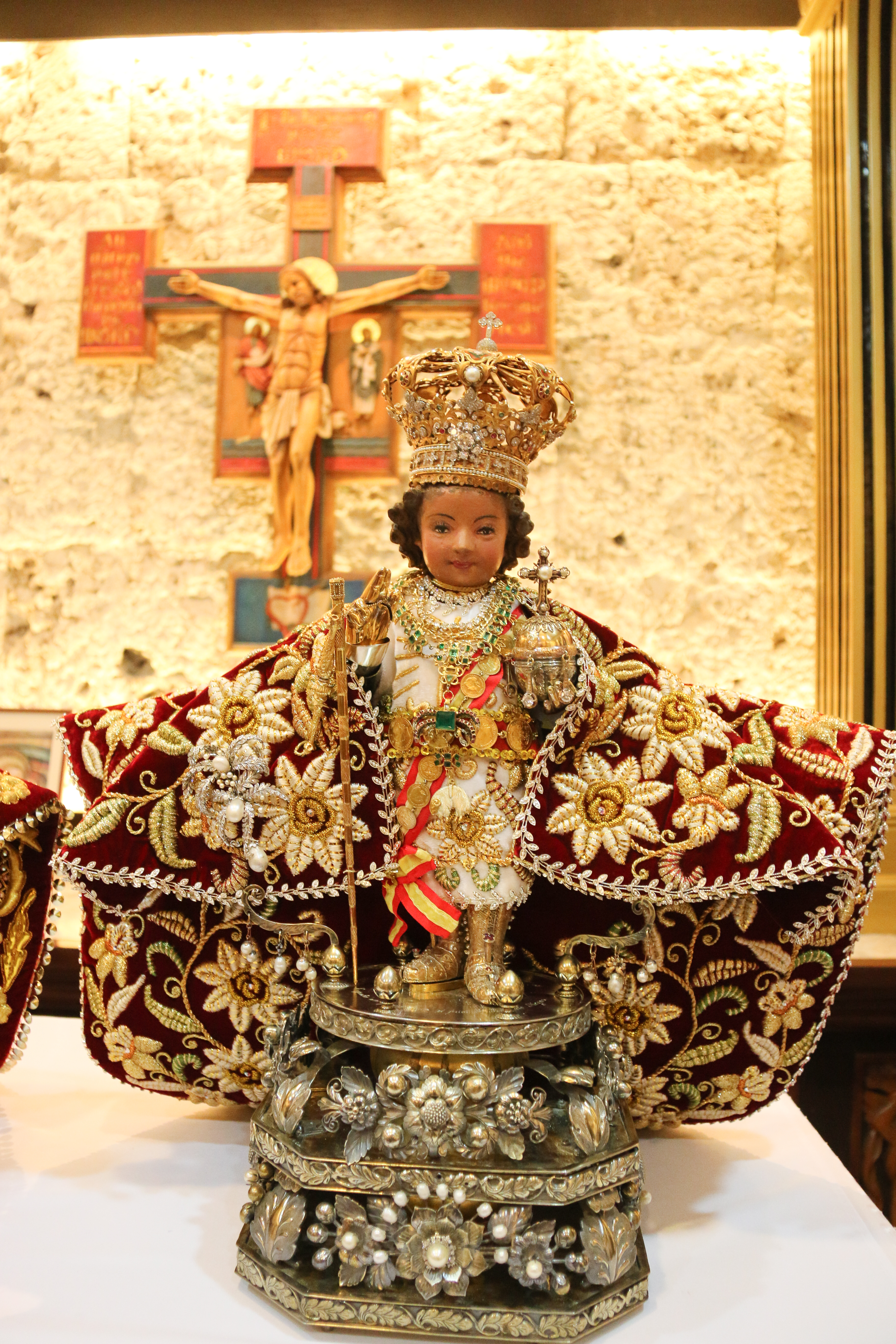
The original image of Santo Niño de Cebú, an image of the Child Jesus given by Magellan to the Cebuanos, now enshrined at the Basilica Minore del Santo Niño.

The fleet left Spain on 20 September 1519, sailing west across the Atlantic toward South America. In late November, they made landfall at Cabo de Santo Agostinho, near present day Recife. The Tupi natives, having already engaged with Portuguese and French loggers, were familiar with Europeans, and the encounter was cordial. In December, they arrived at Guanabara Bay, the location of present-day Rio de Janeiro. Magellan and the crew stayed onshore for two weeks, replenishing their provisions and peacefully interacting with the locals. Despite the pleasantries, the first fatal casualty of the expedition occurred. Two months earlier, during the Atlantic crossing, a member of the crew, Antonio Salomon, was caught raping a cabin boy. Tried and found guilty, he was garroted two months later on the shore of Guanabara Bay. From there, they sailed south along the coast, searching for a way through or around the continent. After three months of searching (including a false start in the estuary of Río de la Plata), weather conditions forced the fleet to stop their search to wait out the winter. They found a sheltered natural harbor at the port of Saint Julian, and remained there for five months. Shortly after landing at St. Julian, there was a mutiny attempt led by the Spanish captains Juan de Cartagena, Gaspar de Quesada and Luis de Mendoza. Magellan barely managed to quell the mutiny, despite at one point losing control of three of his five ships to the mutineers. Mendoza was killed during the conflict, and Magellan sentenced Quesada and Cartagena to being beheaded and marooned, respectively. Lower-level conspirators were made to do hard labor in chains over the winter, but were later freed.

During the winter, one of the fleet's ships, the Santiago, was lost in a storm while surveying nearby waters, though no men were killed. Following the winter, the fleet resumed their search for a passage to the Pacific in October 1520. Three days later, they found a bay which eventually led them to a strait, now known as the Strait of Magellan, which allowed them passage through to the Pacific. While exploring the strait, one of the remaining four ships, the San Antonio, deserted the fleet, returning east to Spain. The fleet reached the Pacific by the end of November 1520. Based on the incomplete understanding of world geography at the time, Magellan expected a short journey to Asia, perhaps taking as little as three or four days. In fact, the Pacific crossing took three months and twenty days. The long journey exhausted their supply of food and water, and around 30 men died, mostly of scurvy. Magellan himself remained healthy, perhaps because of his personal supply of preserved quince.

On 6 March 1521, the exhausted fleet made landfall at the island of Guam and were met by native Chamorro people who came aboard the ships and took items such as rigging, knives, and a ship's boat. The Chamorro people may have thought they were participating in a trade exchange (as they had already given the fleet some supplies), but the crew interpreted their actions as theft. Magellan sent a raiding party ashore to retaliate, killing several Chamorro men, burning their houses, and recovering the stolen goods.

On 16 March, the fleet sighted the island of Samar ("Zamal") in the eastern Philippine Islands. They dropped anchor in the small (then uninhabited) island of Homonhon ("Humunu"), where they would remain for a week while their sick crew members recuperated. Magellan befriended the tattooed locals of the neighboring island of Suluan ("Zuluan") and traded goods and supplies and learned of the names of neighboring islands and local customs.

After resting and resupplying, Magellan sailed on deeper into the Visayan Islands. On 28 March, they anchored off the island of Limasawa ("Mazaua") where they encountered a small outrigger boat ("boloto"). After talking with the crew of the boat via Enrique of Malacca (Magellan's slave-interpreter who was originally from Sumatra), they were met by the two large balangay warships ("balanghai") of Rajah Kulambo ("Colambu") of Butuan, and one of his sons. They went ashore to Limasawa where they met Kulambo's brother, another leader, Rajah Siawi ("Siaui") of Surigao ("Calagan"). The rulers were on a hunting expedition on Limasawa. They received Magellan as their guest and told him of their customs and of the regions they controlled in northeastern Mindanao. The tattooed rulers and the locals also wore and used a great amount of golden jewelry and golden artifacts, which piqued Magellan's interest. On 31 March, Magellan's crew held the first Mass in the Philippines, planting a cross on the island's highest hill. Before leaving, Magellan asked the rulers for the next nearest trading ports. They recommended he visit the Rajahnate of Cebu ("Zubu"), because it was the largest. They set off for Cebu, accompanied by the balangays of Rajah Kulambo and reached its port on 7 April.

Magellan met with the King of Cebu, Rajah Humabon, who asked them for tribute as a trade, thinking they were traders bartering with them. Magellan and his men insisted that they did not need to pay tribute as they were sent by the king of Spain, "the most powerful king in the world", and that they were willing to give peace to them if they wanted peace and war if they wanted war. Humabon then decided not to ask for any more tribute and welcomed them instead to the Kingdom of Cebu (Sugbo). To mark the arrival of Christianity in the Far East, Magellan then planted a Cross on the shorelines of the kingdom. Magellan set about converting the locals, including the king and his wife, Queen Humamay, to Christianity. Rajah Humabon was renamed "Carlos" and Queen Humamay was renamed "Juana" after the king and queen of Spain. After her baptism, the queen asked the Spaniards for the image of the Child Jesus (Santo Niño), which she was drawn to, and begged them for the image in contrition, amidst her tears. Magellan then gave the image of the Child Jesus, along with an image of the Virgin Mary, and a bust of Christ to the queen as a gesture of goodwill for accepting the new faith. The king then had a Blood Compact with Magellan in order to cement the allegiance of the Spaniards and the Cebuanos. The king then told the Spaniards to go to the island of Mactan to kill his enemy Lapulapu.

The Spaniards went to the island of Mactan just as Rajah Humabon had told them to. However, they did not initially come by force and wanted to Christianize them. Unlike the people of Cebu who accepted the new religion readily, the King of Mactan, Datu Lapulapu, and the rest of the island of Mactan resisted. On 27 April, Magellan and members of his crew attempted to subdue the Mactan natives by force, but in the ensuing battle, the Europeans were overpowered and Magellan was killed by Lapulapu and his men.

Following his death, Magellan was initially succeeded by co-commanders Juan Serrano and Duarte Barbosa (with a series of other officers later leading). The fleet left the Philippines (following a bloody betrayal by former ally Rajah Humabon, who had poisoned many Spanish soldiers on a banquet ruse on the night after the battle for being easily defeated by Lapulapu and the people of Mactan and failing to kill Lapulapu) and eventually made their way to the Moluccas in November 1521. Laden with spices, they attempted to set sail for Spain in December, but found that only one of their remaining two ships, the Victoria, was seaworthy. The Victoria, captained by Juan Sebastián Elcano, finally returned to Spain by 6 September 1522, completing the circumnavigation. Of the 270 men who left with the expedition, only 18 or 19 survivors returned.

== Death ==
After several weeks in the Philippines, Magellan had converted as many as 2,200 locals to Christianity, including Rajah Humabon of Cebu and most leaders of the islands around Cebu. However, Lapulapu, the leader of Mactan, resisted conversion. In order to gain the trust of Rajah Humabon, Magellan sailed to Mactan with a small force on the morning of 27 April 1521. During the resulting battle against Lapulapu's troops, Magellan was struck by a "bamboo" spear (bangkaw, which are actually metal-tipped fire-hardened rattan), and later surrounded and finished off with other weapons.

Antonio Pigafetta and Ginés de Mafra provided written documents of the events culminating in Magellan's death:

When morning came forty-nine of us leaped into the water up to our thighs, and walked through water for more than two crossbow flights before we could reach the shore. The boats could not approach nearer because of certain rocks in the water. The other eleven men remained behind to guard the boats. When we reached land, those men had formed in three divisions to the number of more than one thousand five hundred persons. When they saw us, they charged down upon us with exceeding loud cries... The musketeers and crossbowmen shot from a distance for about a half-hour, but uselessly; for the shots only passed through the shields... Recognizing the captain, so many turned upon him that they knocked his helmet off his head twice... An Indian hurled a bamboo spear into the captain's face, but the latter immediately killed him with his lance, which he left in the Indian's body. Then, trying to lay hand on sword, he could draw it out but halfway, because he had been wounded in the arm with a bamboo spear. When the natives saw that, they all hurled themselves upon him. One of them wounded him on the left leg with a large cutlass, which resembles a scimitar, only being larger. That caused the captain to fall face downward, when immediately they rushed upon him with iron and bamboo spears and with their cutlasses, until they killed our mirror, our light, our comfort, and our true guide.

— Antonio Pigafetta

Nothing of Magellan's body survived; that afternoon the grieving rajah-king, hoping to recover his remains, offered Mactan's victorious chief a handsome ransom of copper and iron for them, but Datu Lapulapu refused. He intended to keep the body as a war trophy. Since his wife and child died in Seville before any member of the expedition could return to Spain, it seemed that every evidence of Ferdinand Magellan's existence had vanished from the earth.

— Ginés de Mafra

== Reputation following circumnavigation ==
A 1561 map of America showing Magellan's name for the Pacific, Mare pacificum, and the Strait of Magellan, labelled Frenum Magaliani

In the immediate aftermath of the circumnavigation, few celebrated Magellan for his accomplishments, and he was widely discredited and reviled in Spain and his native Portugal. In Portugal, some regarded Magellan as a traitor for having sailed for Spain. In Spain, Magellan's reputation suffered due to the largely unflattering accounts of his actions given by the survivors of the expedition.

The first news of the expedition came from the crew of the San Antonio, led by Estêvão Gomes, which deserted the fleet in the Strait of Magellan and returned to Seville 6 May 1521. The deserters were put on trial, but eventually exonerated after producing a distorted version of the mutiny at Saint Julian, and depicting Magellan as disloyal to the king. The expedition was assumed to have perished. The Casa de Contratación withheld Magellan's salary from his wife, Beatriz, "considering the outcome of the voyage", and she was placed under house arrest with their young son on the orders of Archbishop Fonseca.

The 18 survivors who eventually returned aboard the Victoria in September 1522 were also largely unfavourable to Magellan. Many, including the captain, Juan Sebastián Elcano, had participated in the mutiny at Saint Julian. On the ship's return, Charles summoned Elcano to Valladolid, inviting him to bring two guests. He brought sailors Francisco Albo and Hernándo de Bustamante, pointedly not including Antonio Pigafetta, the expedition's chronicler. Under questioning by Valladolid's mayor, the men claimed that Magellan refused to follow the king's orders (and gave this as the cause for the mutiny at Saint Julian), and that he unfairly favoured his relatives among the crew, and disfavoured the Spanish captains.

One of the few survivors loyal to Magellan was Antonio Pigafetta. Though not invited to testify with Elcano, Pigafetta made his own way to Valladolid and presented Charles with a hand-written copy of his notes from the journey. He would later travel through Europe giving copies to other royals including John III of Portugal, Francis I of France, and Philippe Villiers de L'Isle-Adam. After returning to his home of Venice, Pigafetta published his diary (as Relazione del primo viaggio intorno al mondo) around 1524. Scholars have come to view Pigafetta's diary as the most thorough and reliable account of the circumnavigation, and its publication helped to eventually counter the misinformation spread by Elcano and the other surviving mutineers. In an often-cited passage following his description of Magellan's death in the Battle of Mactan, Pigafetta eulogizes the captain-general:

Magellan's main virtues were courage and perseverance, in even the most difficult situations; for example he bore hunger and fatigue better than all the rest of us. He was a magnificent practical seaman, who understood navigation better than all his pilots. The best proof of his genius is that he circumnavigated the world, none having preceded him.

== Legacy ==
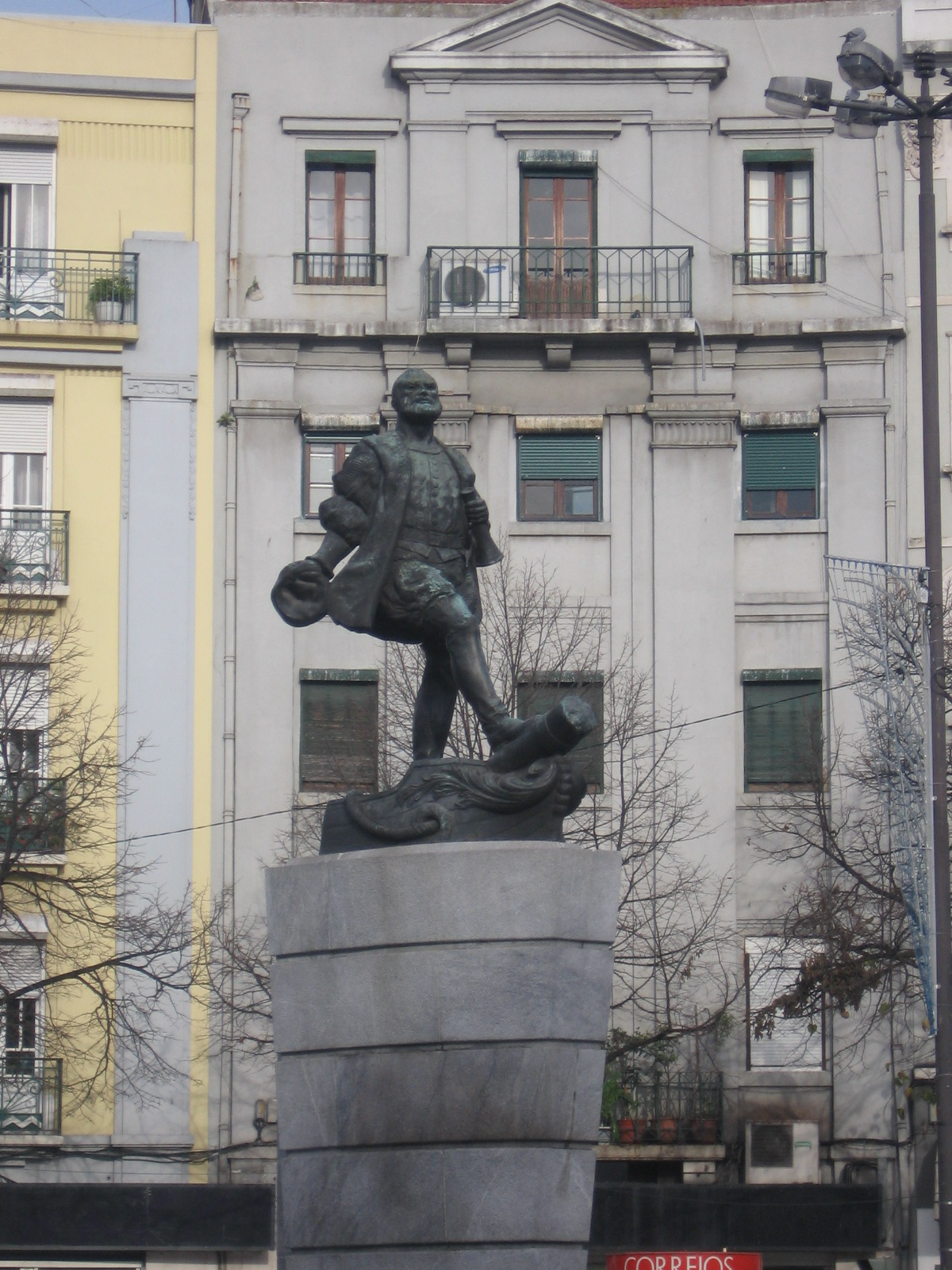
Monument to Magellan in Lisbon

Magellan has come to be renowned for his navigational skills and tenacity. The first circumnavigation has been called "the greatest sea voyage in the Age of Discovery", and even "the most important maritime voyage ever undertaken". Appreciation of Magellan's accomplishments may have been enhanced over time by the failure of subsequent expeditions which attempted to retrace his route, beginning with the Loaísa expedition in 1525 (which featured Juan Sebastián Elcano as second-in-command). The next expedition to complete a circumnavigation, led by Francis Drake, was not until 58 years after the return of the Victoria, in 1580.

Magellan named the Pacific Ocean (which was sometimes referred to as the Sea of Magellan, in his honor, until the 18th century) and lends his name to the Strait of Magellan. His name has also since been applied to a variety of other entities, including the Magellanic Clouds (two dwarf galaxies visible in the night sky of the southern hemisphere), Project Magellan (a Cold War-era US Navy project to circumnavigate the world by submarine), and NASA's Magellan spacecraft.

=== Quincentenary ===
Even though Magellan did not survive the trip, he has received more recognition for the expedition than Elcano has. Since Magellan was the one who began it, Portugal wanted to recognize a Portuguese explorer, although Spain wanted to recognize the role of Elcano and the funding of the Spanish King in the expedition. In 2019, the 500th anniversary of the voyage, Spain and Magellan's native Portugal submitted a joint application to UNESCO to honour the circumnavigation route. Commemorations of the circumnavigation included:

- An exhibition titled "The Longest Journey: the first circumnavigation" was opened at the General Archive of the Indies in Seville by the King and Queen of Spain. It was scheduled to be transferred to the San Telmo Museum in San Sebastian in 2020.
- An exhibition entitled Pigafetta: cronista de la primera vuelta al mundo Magallanes Elcano opened at the library of the Spanish Agency for International Development Cooperation in Madrid. It gave prominence to Pigafetta, the chronicler of the expedition.

=== In Popular Media ===
Magellan was played by Mexican actor Gael García Bernal in the 2025 film Magellan which tells the story of his voyage. In the 2022 TV series Boundless, Magellan is portrayed by Brazilian actor Rodrigo Santoro. and 2002 film Lapu-Lapu when he was played by Dante Rivero.

In Sid Meier's Civilization VI, players can recruit Magellan as a Great Admiral.

In Episode 82 of Animaniacs, Yakko, Wakko, and Dot sing the parody "The Ballad of Magellan" to the tune of "Git Along, Little Dogies".

== See also ==
- Age of Discovery
- Chronology of European exploration of Asia
- History of the Philippines
- Military history of the Philippines
- Portuguese Empire
- Spanish Empire
