= Notothenia neglecta =

Scientific classification
- Kingdom: Animalia
- Phylum: Chordata
- Class: Actinopterygii
- Order: Perciformes
- Family: Nototheniidae
- Genus: Notothenia
- Species: N. neglecta

Binomial name
- Notothenia neglecta Nybelin, 1951

Synonyms
- Notothenia coriiceps neglecta Nybelin, 1951

Species of fish

Notothenia neglecta, the yellowbelly rockcod, is a species of marine ray-finned fish, belonging to the family Nototheniidae, the notothens or cod icefishes. It is found in the Southern Ocean in Antarctica. They are omnivorous, and are found in both benthic and pelagic regions of the ocean. Their diet includes krill, bivalves, and gastropods. They have evolved unique behaviors and morphological features in order to thrive in the cold and harsh Antarctic climate. N. neglecta is also commercially fished, although not in high numbers.

== Taxonomy ==
Notothenia neglecta was first formally described in 1951 by the Swedish ichthyologist Nybelin with the type locality being given as Deception Island, South Shetland Islands. Some authorities treat this taxon as a synonym of N. coriiceps. The specific name neglecta means "overlooked", thought to be an allusion to this species confusion with N. coriiceps.

== Anatomy and morphology ==
Members of N. neglecta have 3-7 dorsal spines, 37-40 dorsal soft rays, and 3-7 anal soft rays. Younger fish have a black patch located near the tip of their pectoral fin. N. neglecta vary in both size and weight. Sampled N. neglecta typically measure between 20–40 cm (7.9–15.7 in) in length and typically weigh between 200–1,600 g (7.1–56.4 oz). Notothenia neglecta has gut flora composed almost exclusively of the bacteria Vibrio, reflective of the ability of N. neglecta to tolerate high saline conditions and frequent ingestion of Antarctic krill, which is composed of high amounts of chitin. Vibrio in N. neglecta may also play a role in osmoregulation via regulation of sodium ions. N. neglecta possess an inflammatory response pathway that has made the fish suitable for the cold Antarctic environment. Additionally, N. neglecta synthesizes eight antifreeze proteins to combat the freezing temperatures of the environment.

== Distribution and habitat ==
Notothenia neglecta is an Antarctic fish species that typically lives at a depth of 50 m (160 ft), but has also been found living a depths from 0–450 m (0–1,476 ft). Young N. neglecta are typically found at depths of 1–10 m (3 ft 3 in – 32 ft 10 in), and adults are typically found in deeper water. In the Antarctic, they have been found in Antarctic peninsula waters, South Georgia Island, and Peter I Island. It is the dominant fish species in Potter Cove, King George Island, and the South Shetland Islands. N. neglecta display a wide and diverse diet. They are an omnivorous species, and feed on both benthic and pelagic species. Benthic N. neglecta most commonly feed on krill, but in the summertime, heavily prey on salps. N. neglecta has also been shown to feed on a variety of isopods, amphipods, algae, and bivalves.

== Behavior ==
N. neglecta engage in unique behaviors that have allowed them to thrive in the harsh Antarctic climate. They typically feed at night, which may be attributed to avoidance of larger predators who tend to feed during the day, and also because many of the creatures they feed on are nocturnal. Aggressiveness in feeding has been linked to photoperiod, or availability of light throughout the day. They are less aggressive in their pursuit of prey during the day, but at night, the highest level of aggressiveness and pursuit are observed. N. neglecta has also demonstrated evidence of social hierarchy. Scientists have observed fish become less reactive to availability of prey in the presence of another member of their species. This suggests that these less reactive members may be the less dominant members of their groups. Once the other fish were removed from the environment, the original member would hunt prey as normal.

N. neglecta only spawns once a year. Females usually have their first spawn between the ages of 6 and 8 years old.
