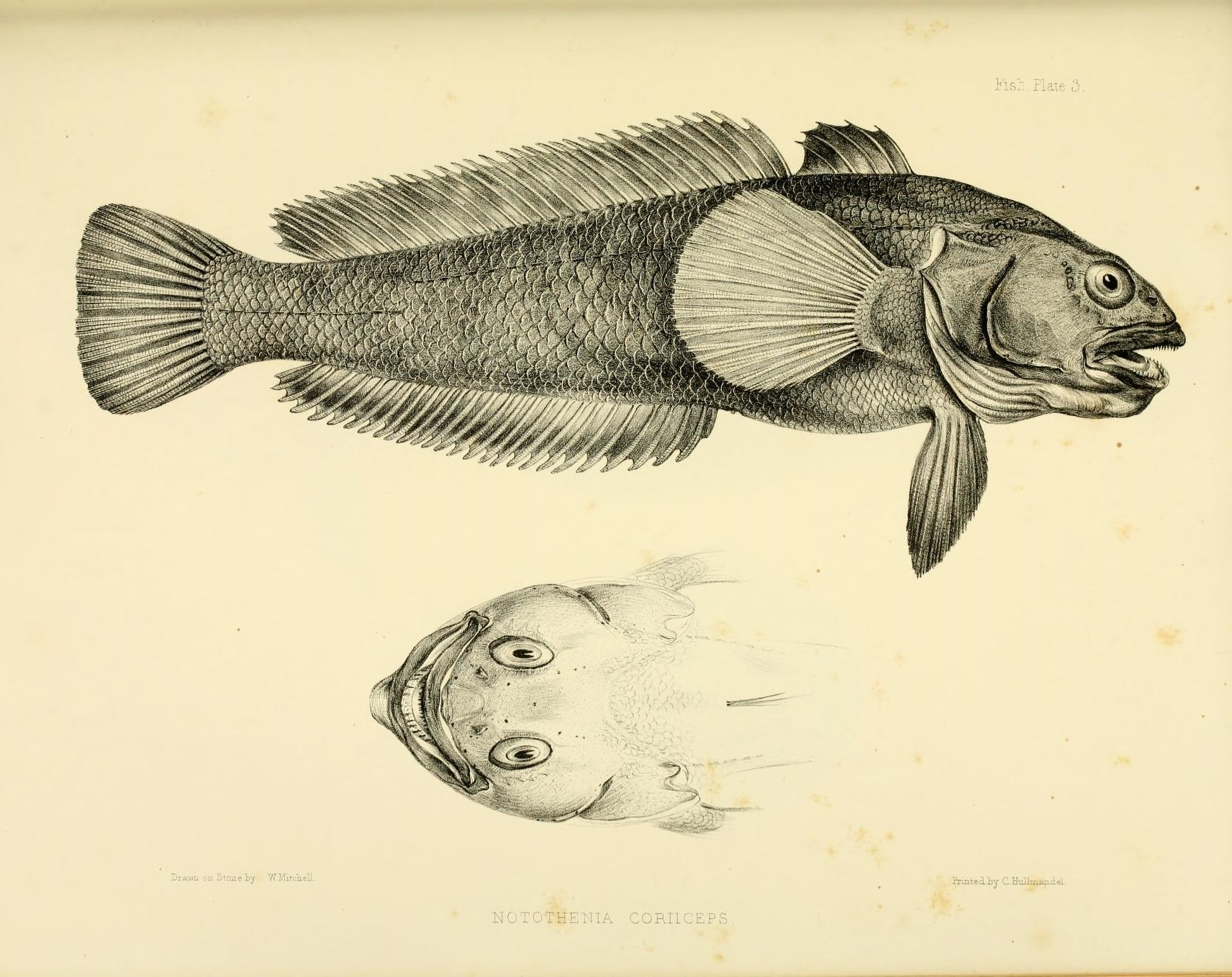
- Biodiversity Heritage Library

Scientific classification
- Kingdom: Animalia
- Phylum: Chordata
- Class: Actinopterygii
- Order: Perciformes
- Family: Nototheniidae
- Genus: Notothenia
- Species: N. coriiceps

Binomial name
- Notothenia coriiceps J. Richardson, 1844

Synonyms
- Indonotothenia cyanobrancha (Richardson, 1844); Notothenia purpuriceps Richardson, 1844

= Notothenia coriiceps =

Species of fish

Notothenia coriiceps, also known as the black rockcod, Antarctic yellowbelly rockcod, or Antarctic bullhead notothen, is a species of marine ray-finned fish, belonging to the family Nototheniidae, the notothens or cod icefishes. It is widely spread around the Antarctic continent. Like other Antarctic notothenioid fishes, N. coriiceps evolved in the stable, ice-cold environment of the Southern Ocean. It is not currently targeted by commercial fisheries.

== Taxonomy ==
Notothenia coriiceps was first formally described in 1844 by the Scottish naval surgeon, naturalist and Arctic explorer John Richardson with the type locality given as the coasts of the Kerguelen Islands and the Auckland Islands. Richardson named a new genus, Notothenia, in his description and this species was designated as its type species by Theodore Nicholas Gill in 1862. The specific name is a compound of corium meaning "skin" or "leather" and ceps which means "head", a reference to the scaleless head with its rough, conical sensory papillae.

== Distribution and diet ==
N. coriiceps maintains a circum-Antarctic distribution that is likely governed at least in part by the presence of the Antarctic Circumpolar Current (ACC) as well as its egg dispersal patterns. Populations of this species have been recorded at sites in the western Ross Sea, the Weddell Sea, the Western Antarctic Peninsula, the islands of the Scotia Arc to South Georgia, the Balleny Islands, and the sub-Antarctic islands of the Indian Ocean sector. N. coriiceps feeds on macroalgae amphipods and euphausiids. It appears to feed year-round, although diet composition likely varies seasonally.

== Morphology ==
N. coriiceps members have scales that typically appear brown or gray in color. Its teeth consist of a multi-row tooth plate and caniform teeth, which are located in the outer portion of the jaw. Adults males typically reach a length of approximately 50 cm (20 in).

Like many other notothenioid fishes, it lacks a swim bladder. Bone density increases during maturation, resulting in reduced buoyancy and the transition from pelagic to demersal swimming behavior. Adults N. coriiceps possess a dense, well-developed skeleton compared to its congener Notothenia rossii, accounting for its reduced buoyancy.

Its epithelium is characterized by the presence of fat droplets, which serve as a storage mechanism for dietary lipids. Fat droplets are also stored in bone tissue.

== Physiology ==
Like most other Antarctic notothenioids, N. coriiceps exhibits several adaptations that optimize organismal performance at subzero temperatures. These include a modified heat shock response, the production of antifreeze glycoproteins that prevent ice crystallization of body fluids at subzero temperatures, and the abundance of polyunsaturated fatty acids that allow cells to maintain membrane fluidity. N. coriiceps has a limited tolerance for acute temperature change but has demonstrated the capacity to extend its thermal limits upon long-term acclimation to warmer temperatures.

== Genome ==
The N. coriiceps genome was sequenced in 2014. Results indicated rapid evolution of genes during speciation, especially in proteins that code for mitochondrial proteins and hemoglobin. In addition, the authors found that many N. coriiceps genes are reflective of adaptation to cold temperatures, with specialized genes related to the species' modified heat shock response as well as enhanced oxidative phosphorylation at cold temperatures.
