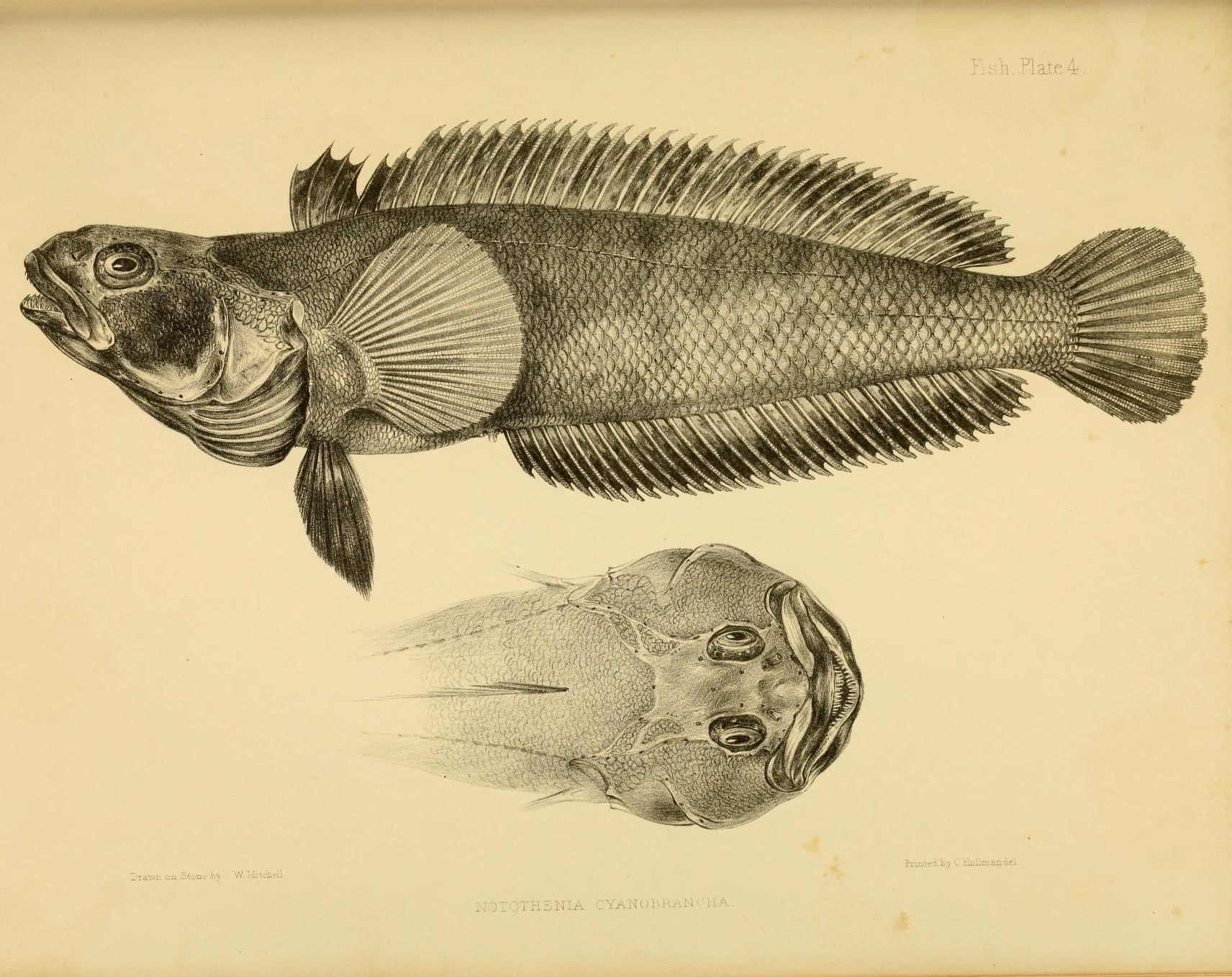
- Illustration of a specimen collected during the voyage of HMS Erebus (1826) and HMS Terror

Scientific classification
- Kingdom: Animalia
- Phylum: Chordata
- Class: Actinopterygii
- Order: Perciformes
- Family: Nototheniidae
- Genus: Notothenia
- Species: N. cyanobrancha

Binomial name
- Notothenia cyanobrancha J. Richardson, 1844

Synonyms
- Indonotothenia cyanobrancha (Richardson, 1844); Notothenia purpuriceps Richardson, 1844

= Notothenia cyanobrancha =

Species of fish

Notothenia cyanobrancha, the blue rockcod, bluegill notothen, or bluegill rockcod, is a species of marine ray-finned fish, belonging to the family Nototheniidae, the notothens or cod icefishes. It is native to the Kerguelen and Heard Islands in the Southern Ocean.

== Taxonomy ==
Notothenia cyanobrancha was first formally described in 1844 by the Scottish naval surgeon, naturalist and Arctic explorer John Richardson with the type locality given as Kerguelen Island. This species was placed in its own genus Indonotothenia by Russian ichthyologist A.V. Balushkin in 1984. This classification was repeated in 2011, when W.N. Eschmeyer and Ronald Fricke classified N. cyanobrancha in their Catalog of Fishes, but this was not used in Ofer Gon and Phillip C. Heemstra's Fishes of the Southern Ocean (in which Indonotothenia is classified as a subgenus of Notothenia), R.G. Miller's A History and Atlas of Fishes of the Antarctic Ocean, or W. Fischer and J.-C. Hureau's FAO species identification sheets for fishery purposes, Southern Ocean (Fishing areas 48, 58 and 88) (CCAMLR Convention Area), three major books on the fishes of the Southern Ocean. However, more research is needed to determine whether this species should be placed in its own genus; as of 2021, FishBase considers Indonotothenia cyanobrancha a junior synonym of N. cyanobrancha. The specific name is a compound of cyano meaning "blue" and branchus which means "gill", a reference to the band of deep purple or blue colour skirting the edge of the gill membrane.

== Etymology ==
Described by Sir John Richardson in 1844, its species name (cyanobrancha) is derived from the Greek words 'cyano' and 'branchia', meaning 'blue' and 'gills' respectively, in reference to the distinctive blue gills of this species.

== Description ==
In life, this species is uniformly brownish to blackish. In brownish-colored specimens, darker markings may be present on the body, in both color forms, the ventral areas are paler than the body. The margin of the opercular membrane (near the gills) is distinctively dark blue, hence the name of this species. The maximum reported length is 30 cm (11.8 in); however, lengths of up to 20 cm (7.9 in) are more common.

== Ecology ==
This species is demersal, inhabits relatively shallow waters of 0－27 m (0－89 ft), and is predatory, feeding mainly feeding on amphipods, isopods (Exsosphaeroma gigas and Serolis spp.), the decapod Halicarcinus planatus, and gastropods of the Nacella genus. It is itself preyed on by the black-browed albatross (Thalassarche melanophris).

Sexual maturity is reached at 3－4 years old and at length of 10 cm (3.9 inches). Spawning takes place in April each year, however, first-time spawners spawn in January. 20,000-30,000 eggs of diameter 1.3-1.6 mm are laid. These hatch into larvae with a year-long pelagic phase that are the most abundant inshore larval fish species around the Kerguelen Islands, where they are present year-round, but most common in February.

== Commercial importance ==
Although this species is caught as bycatch (largely in bottom trawls) for commercially important species in the Kerguelen Islands such as Champsocephalus gunnari, it is of no importance to commercial fisheries.
