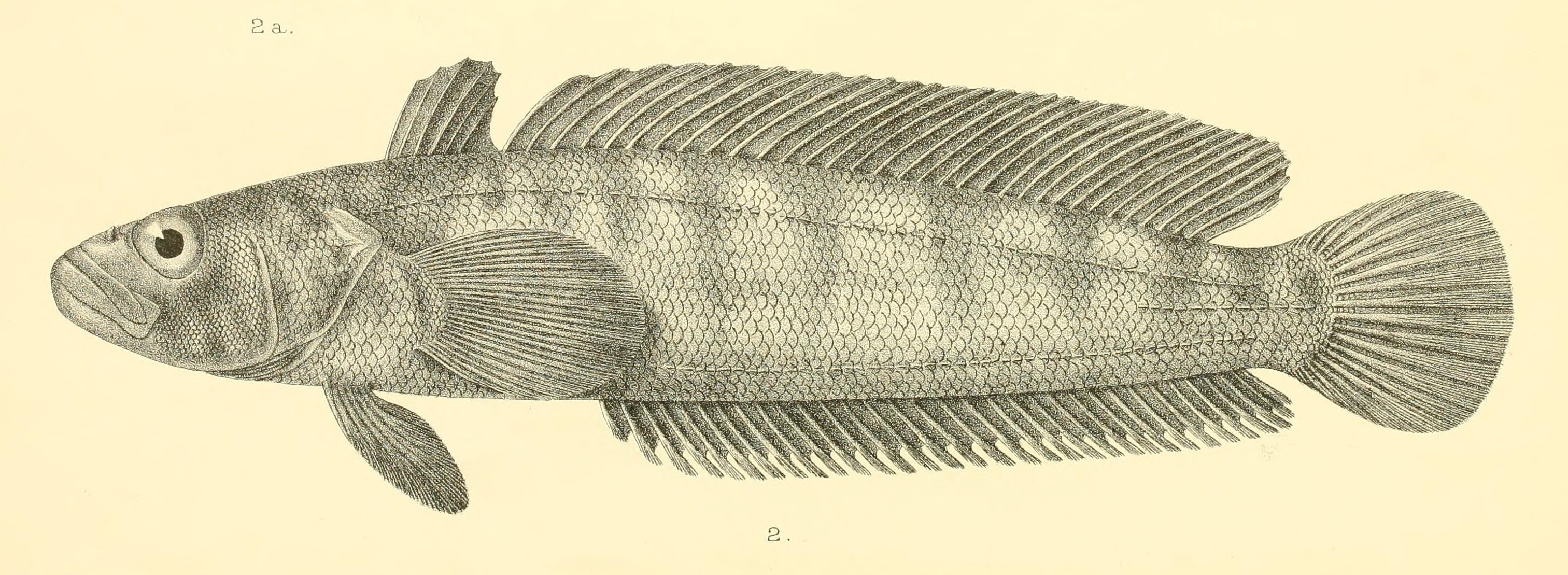

Scientific classification
- Kingdom: Animalia
- Phylum: Chordata
- Class: Actinopterygii
- Order: Perciformes
- Family: Nototheniidae
- Genus: Notothenia
- Species: N. trigramma

Binomial name
- Notothenia trigramma Regan, 1913

Synonyms
- Paranotothenia trigramma (Regan, 1913)

= Notothenia trigramma =

Species of fish

Notothenia trigramma is a species of marine ray-finned fish, belonging to the family Nototheniidae, the notothens or cod icefishes. It occurs in the southwestern Atlantic Ocean.

== Taxonomy ==
Notothenia trigramma was first formally described in 1913 by the English ichthyologist Charles Tate Regan with the type locality given as the harbour at Port Stanley in the Falkland Islands, the type specimen being collected on the Scottish National Antarctic Expedition. Some authorities classify this species in the genus Paranotothenia, although FishBase has retained it in the genus Notothenia pending further studies. Other authorities have placed this species in the genus Patagonotothen and some have regarded it as a synonym of Patagonotothen canina. The specific name trigramma means "three lined", a reference to the three lateral lines possessed by this species.

== Description ==
Notothenia trigramma has a body which has a standard length which is five times its depth. It has a projecting lower jaw and the maxilla reaches the front third of the eye. The head is scaly except for the snout, nose and gill covers. The first dorsal fin has 6 spines, the second dorsal fin has 34 rays while the anal fin has 32 rays. The caudal fin is rounded. There are three lateral lines, upper, middle and lower. The overall colour is brownish with darker fins. The total length of the holotype was 280 mm (11 in).

== Distribution, habitat and biology ==
Notothenia trigramma is found in the southwestern Atlantic around the Falkland Islands. This is a little known demersal species which is thought to have benthic habits.
