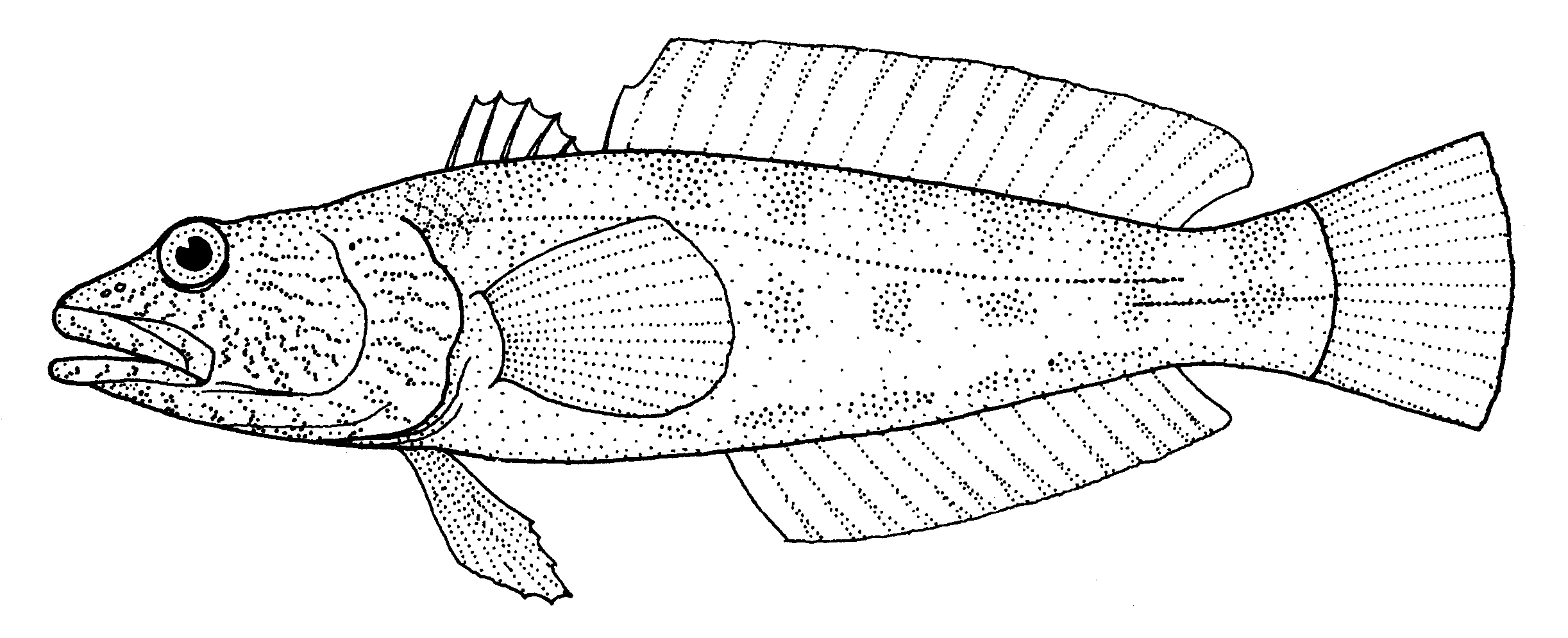
- Drawing by Dr Tony Ayling

Scientific classification
- Kingdom: Animalia
- Phylum: Chordata
- Class: Actinopterygii
- Order: Perciformes
- Family: Nototheniidae
- Genus: Notothenia
- Species: N. angustata

Binomial name
- Notothenia angustata F. W. Hutton, 1875

Synonyms
- Paranotothenia angustata (F. W. Hutton, 1875)

= Notothenia angustata =

Maori chief

Species of fish

Notothenia angustata, the Maori chief or black cod, is a species of marine ray-finned fish, belonging to the family Nototheniidae, the notothens or cod icefishes. It is native to the Southern Ocean

== Taxonomy ==
Notothenia angustata was first formally described in 1875 by the English-born New Zealand scientist Frederick Wollaston Hutton with the type locality given as Dunedin in New Zealand. The specific name angustata means "narrowed" a reference to the relatively narrow head of this species.

== Description ==
Notothenia angustata is a large demersal fish which is quite similar in shape and colour to the Maori cod (Paranotothen magellanica). The mouth is large and there are obvious bony ridge over each eye. They have a rounded caudal fin and slightly overlapping lateral lines. The small first dorsal fin has six spines. The colour is dark grey or green on the upper body with blue-black mottling and it has a yellow abdomen. There are many small grey spots and streaks on the head and the grey fins have dark mottling. This species attains a maximum total length of 41 cm (16 in).

== Distribution and habitat ==
Notothenia angustata is found in the Southern Ocean and the Southern Pacific Ocean. It is found from New Zealand and Chile south and throughout the Subantarctic, at depths to 100 m (330 ft). The juveniles are often found in tide pools, with the adults on rocky reefs.

== Biology ==
Notothenia angustata feeds on cephalopods, benthic invertrebrates and small fishes. However, in Chile, a study found that the main component of their diet was algae. This species has some of the same genes as its more southerly relatives for the production of antifreeze proteins in its blood. The Chilean study referenced above found 11 taxa of parasites living in specimens of this species including digeneans, cestodes and nematodes.

== Utilisation ==
Nothotenia angustata is caught using hook and lines and the flesh is edible but not highly regarded and any caught tend to be used as bait in lobster fisheries.
