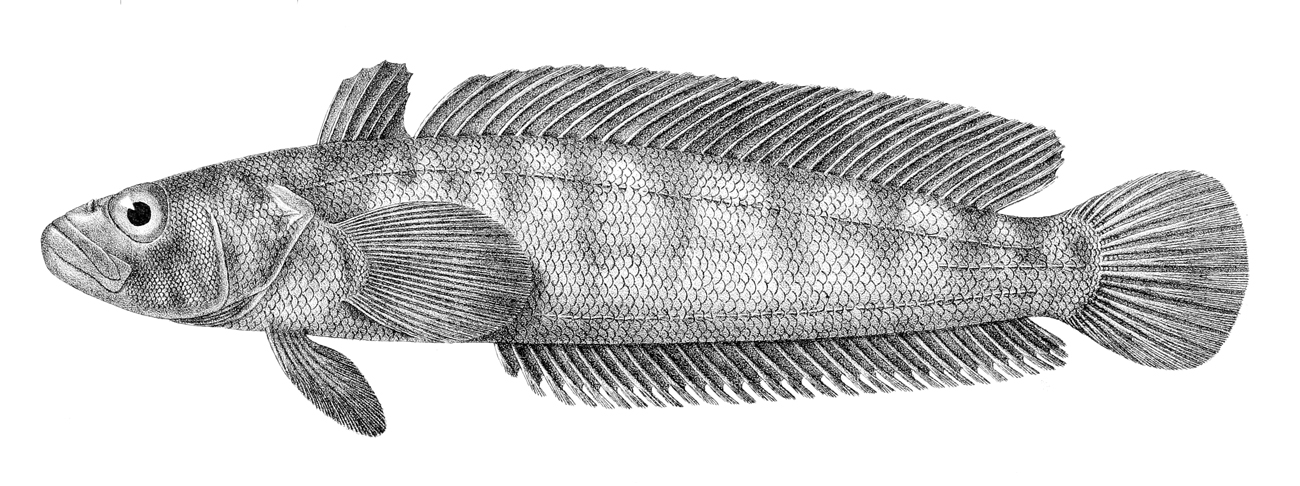

Scientific classification
- Kingdom: Animalia
- Phylum: Chordata
- Class: Actinopterygii
- Order: Perciformes
- Family: Nototheniidae
- Genus: Notothenia
- Species: N. rossii

Binomial name
- Notothenia rossii J. Richardson, 1844

Synonyms
- Notothenia rossii rossii J. Richardson, 1844; Notothenia marmorata J. G. Fischer, 1885; Notothenia rossii marmorata J. G. Fischer, 1885; Notothenia coriiceps macquariensis Waite, 1916

= Marbled rockcod =

Species of fish

The marbled rockcod (Notothenia rossii) is a species of marine ray-finned fish, belonging to the family Nototheniidae, the notothens or cod icefishes. It is native to the Southern Ocean, where it can be found at depths from 5 to 350 m (16 to 1,148 ft). This is a commercially important species.

== Taxonomy ==
The marbled rockcod was first formally described in 1844 by the Scottish naval surgeon, naturalist and Arctic explorer John Richardson with no type locality given, although it is thought likely to be Kerguelen Island. Richardson gave it the specific name rossii which honours James Clark Ross, the leader of the Ross expedition, a scientific expedition by the vessels HMS Erebus and HMS Terror to survey and explore the coasts of Antarctica.

== Description ==
The marbled rockcod can reach a length of 92 cm (36 in), though a more common length is around 50 cm (20 in). The greatest recorded weight for this species is 10 kg (22 lb). The dorsal fin is divided in two parts, with four to seven spines in the front portion and 32 to 36 soft rays in the long, back portion. The anal fin has 26 to 30 soft rays. The colour and pattern varies but it is typically dark brown with dark marbling on the upper body, paler on the lower body. The first dorsal fin has a dark spot in the membrane between each spine. The juveniles are yellowish or golden in colour during their benthic phase while the pelagic juveniles are silvery.

== Distribution ==
The marbled rockcod's range includes the northern end of the Antarctic Peninsula, the Scotia Arc, Prince Edward Islands, Crozet Islands, Kerguelen Islands, Heard Island and Macquarie Island, as well as the Ob Bank, and Lena Bank.

== Biology ==
Marbled rockcod females become sexually mature at about six years of age. Along with mature males they move into the deeper water of the continental shelf. Spawning takes place once a year and the young fish stay mostly in shallow water in the fiords and bays, feeding mainly on zooplankton. Males can live for up to twelve years.

== Fisheries ==
The marbled rockcod was heavily fished by Soviet fishers during the 1960s and 1970s, with catches exceeding 100,000 tonnes in some seasons; it almost disappeared from around South Georgia Island, and by 1980, was depleted throughout the Southern Ocean. It took the population 20 years to show signs of recovery.
