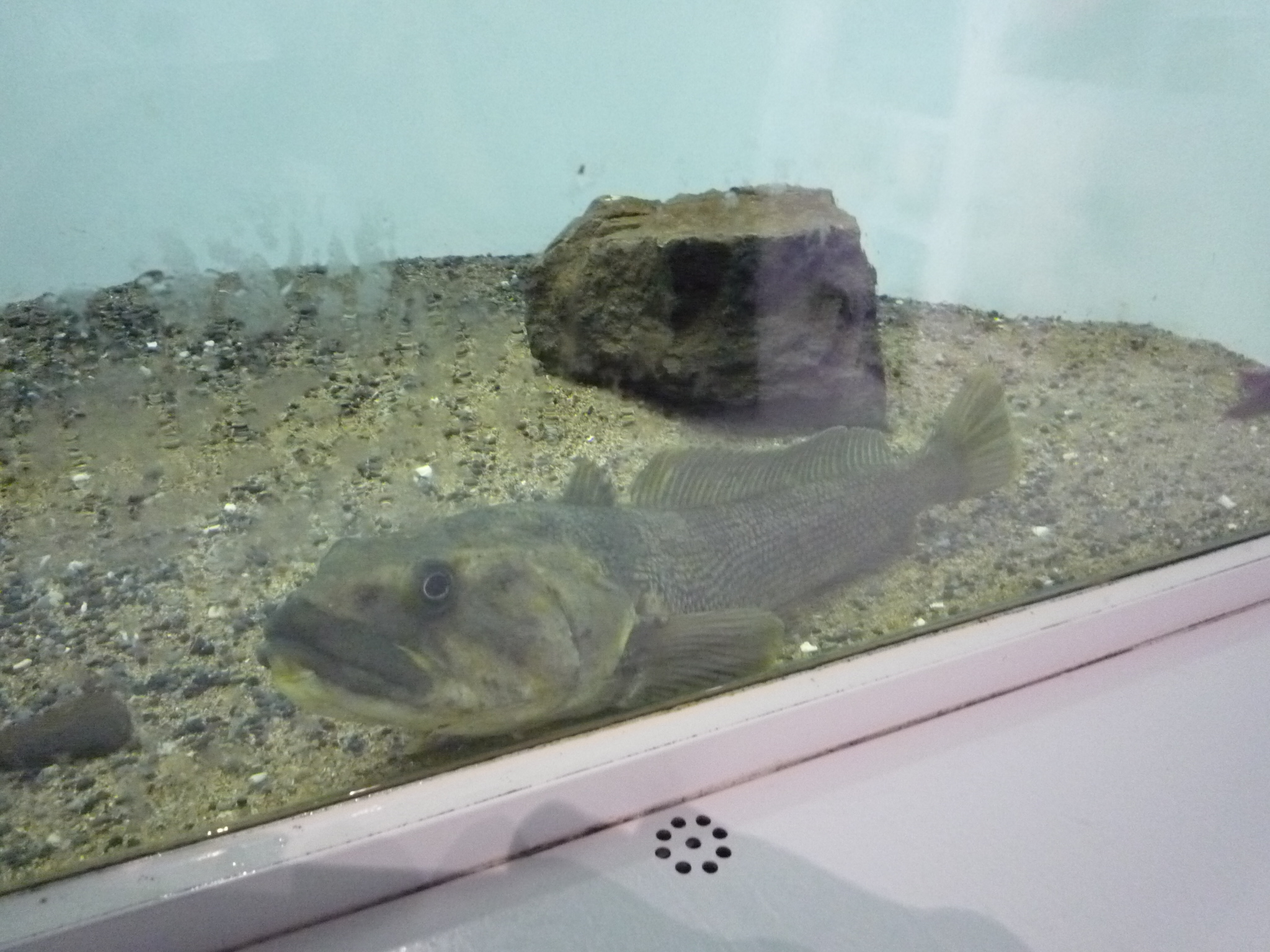
- Notothenia coriiceps

Scientific classification
- Kingdom: Animalia
- Phylum: Chordata
- Class: Actinopterygii
- Order: Perciformes
- Family: Nototheniidae
- Genus: Notothenia; J. Richardson, 1844

Type species
- Notothenia coriiceps J. Richardson, 1844

Synonyms
- Indonotothenia Balushkin, 1984; Macronotothen T.N. Gill, 1862

= Notothenia =

Genus of fishes

Notothenia is a genus of marine ray-finned fishes belonging to the family Nototheniidae, the notothens or cod icefishes with the species in this genus often having the common name of rockcod. They are native to the Southern Ocean and other waters around Antarctica.

== Taxonomy ==
Notothenia was first formally described as a genus in 1844 by the Scottish naval surgeon, naturalist and Arctic explorer John Richardson when he described N. coriiceps which was later designated as the type species of the genus. Some authorities place this taxon in the subfamily Nototheniinae, but the 5th edition of Fishes of the World does not include subfamilies in the Nototheniidae. The name of the genus is a compound of notos meaning "south" and thenia which means "coming from", an allusion to the high southern latitudes these fishes are found at.

== Species ==
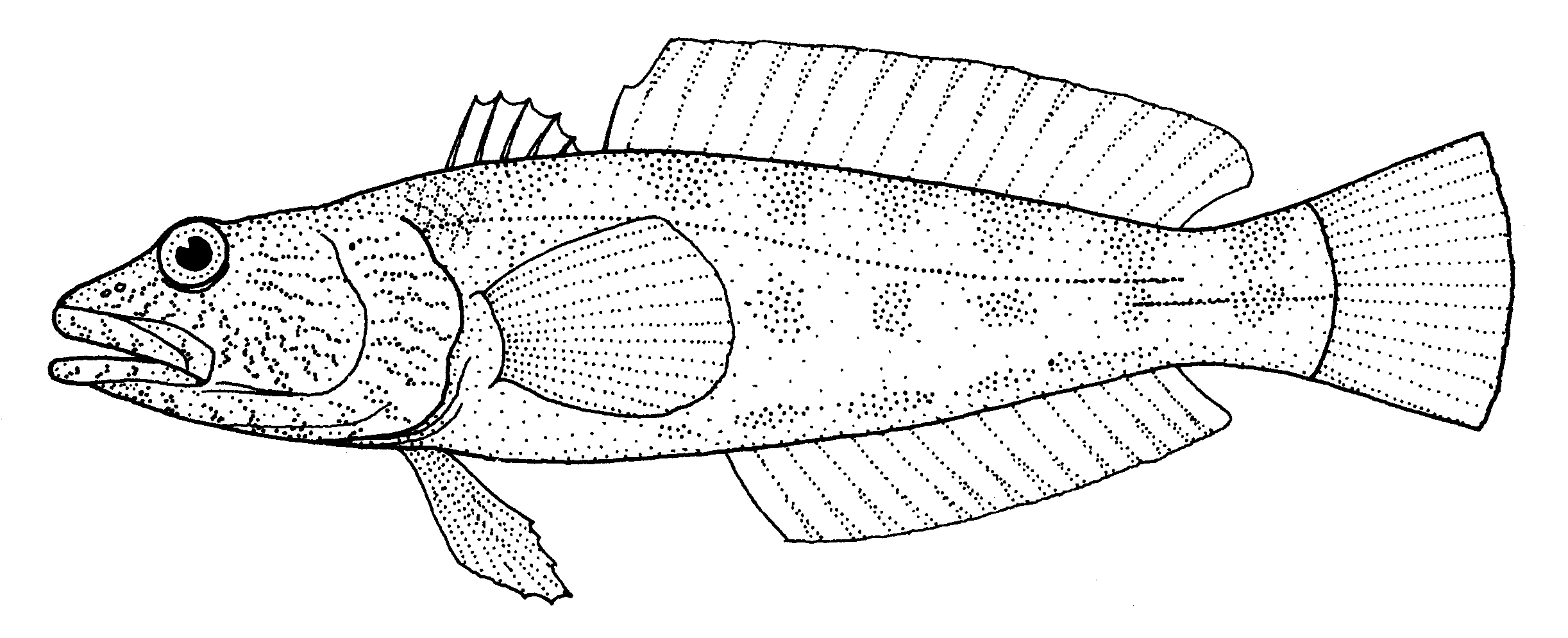
Notothenia angustata (Maori chief)

Seven recognized species are in this genus:

- Notothenia angustata F. W. Hutton, 1875 (Maori chief)
- Notothenia coriiceps J. Richardson, 1844 (black rockcod)
- Notothenia cyanobrancha J. Richardson, 1844 (blue rockcod)
- Notothenia microlepidota F. W. Hutton, 1875 (black cod)
- Notothenia neglecta Nybelin, 1951 (yellowbelly rockcod)
- Notothenia rossii J. Richardson, 1844 (marbled rockcod)
- Notothenia trigramma Regan, 1913

== Characteristics ==
Notothenia fishes have oblong bodies which are compressed towards the tail with a large head, small eyes and a large mouth. The lower jaw does not protrude and the mouth extends as far back as the middle of the eye. There are moderately sized teeth in the jaws with no large canine-like teeth. There are two lateral lines consisting of tubed scales, one on the upper body and the other on the mid-flank. Most of the scales on the body are smooth while much of the head is naked. The pectoral fins are notably larger than the pelvic fins while the caudal fin may be rounded, truncate one emarginate. They vary in maximum total length from 30 cm (12 in) in the blue rockcod to 92 cm (36 in) in the marbled rockcod.

== Distribution and habitat ==
Notothenia rockcods are found in the Southern Ocean where there are four species with two species in the southwestern Pacific Ocean and a single species in the southwestern Atlantic Ocean. The young fish are pelagic and the adults are benthic.

== Biology ==
Notothenia rockcods have some adaptations that allow them to thrive in such inhospitable habitat, like antifreeze proteins in their blood and ample fat to insulate them against heat loss and to offset their lack of a swim bladder. They are benthic predators feeding on invertebrates and smaller fishes, although algae are consumed in large quantities too. The pelagic fingerlings allow the wide dispersal of the species around the Southern Ocean.

== Fisheries ==
Notothenia rockcods are targeted by some fisheries, with N. rossi being an important commercially fished species.
