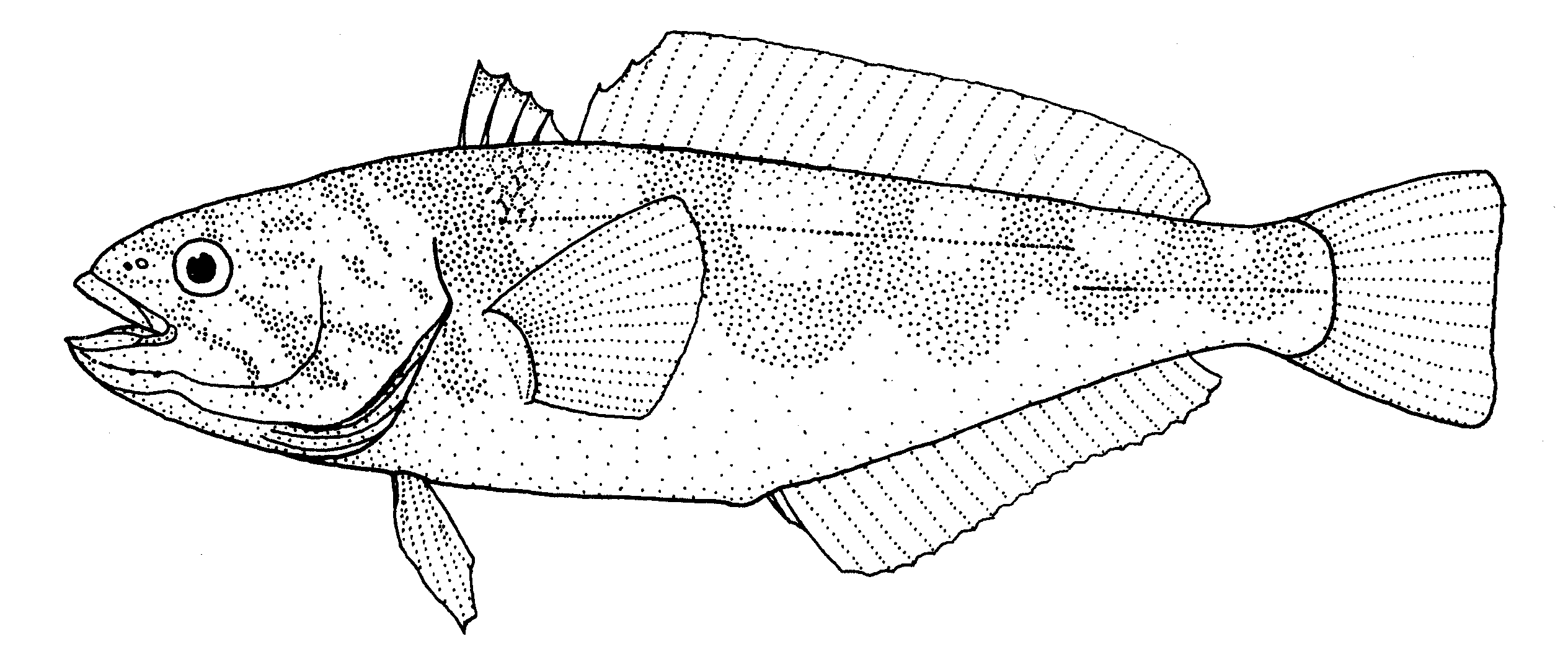
- Drawing by Dr Tony Ayling

Scientific classification
- Kingdom: Animalia
- Phylum: Chordata
- Class: Actinopterygii
- Order: Perciformes
- Family: Nototheniidae
- Genus: Paranotothenia
- Species: P. magellanica

Binomial name
- Paranotothenia magellanica (J. R. Forster, 1801)

Synonyms
- Gadus magellanicus J. R. Forster, 1801; Notothenia magellanica (J. R. Forster, 1801); Notothenia macrocephalus Günther, 1860; Notothenia maoriensis Haast, 1873

= Paranotothenia magellanica =

Species of fish

Paranotothenia magellanica, also known as Magellanic rockcod, Maori cod, blue notothenia or orange throat notothen, is a species of marine ray-finned fish, belonging to the family Nototheniidae, the notothens or cod icefishes. It is native to the Southern Ocean. "Maori chief" and "black cod", sometimes used for this species, usually refer to fishes from the related genus Notothenia. Being a perciform fish, it is unrelated to the true cods of the order Gadiformes. This species is commercially important as a food fish.

== Taxonomy ==
Paranotothenia magellanica was first formally described as Gadus magellanicus in 1801 by the German naturalist Johann Reinhold Forster with the type locality given as the Straits of Magellan. The Russian ichthyologist Arkadii Vladimirovich Balushkin placed it in its own monotypic genus, Paranotothenia, in 1976. A second species P. dewitti was described by Balushkin in 1990. The specific name refers to the type locality.

== Description ==
Paranotothenis magellanica has a wide head with a short snout and a mouth which reaches as far back as the middle of the eye. The front part of the snout is steep, with a prominent bulge before the eye. The eyes are noticeable more widely spaced than those of Notothenia. The wide cranium has a rough upper surface with lots of crests, bumps and pits. The crest over the eye extends rearwards quite far. The head is largely unscaled, although there are small patches of scales to the rear of the eyes. The majority of the body scales are non-ctenoid. The caudal fin ranges from forked in juveniles, emarginate or infrequently slightly rounded in larger individuals to emarginate in the largest fishes found off Antarctica. They have large scales large with the upper lateral line having 36 to 46 tubed scales and the middle lateral line having 5 to 14 tubed scales. There are two dorsal fins, the first is short-based and contains 3 to 6 spines, the second dorsal fin has 28-31 soft rays while the anal fin has 22-25 soft rays. This species attains a maximum total length of 38 cm (15 in), although 45 cm (18 in) has been reported. The upper body is dark blue, greyish-green, brown or black while the abdomen is cream, gold-yellow or reddish. The gill membranes can be orange or red.

== Distribution and habitat ==
Paranotothenia magellanica is found in the Southern Ocean. It occurs off the southern tip of South America and off the Falkland Islands, South Georgia, South Orkney, South Shetland, Prince Edward, Crozet, Kerguelen, Heard and Macquarie islands as well as around southern New Zealand as far north as Kaikōura and around associated islands, it is rare in the Ross Sea. It is found from the surface down to 250 m (820 ft). Large individuals in Antarctic waters are apparently pelagic. Adults elsewhere appear to stay close to shore and may also be pelagic in habit to some extent as they are rarely captured in large bottom trawls.

== Biology ==
Paranotothenia magellanica has pelagic fingerlings which have been captured some distance from land over deep water. Off the Kerguelen Islands spawning appears to occur in April and May, a female may lay 60,000-70,000 pelagic eggs which are about 0.8 mm in diameter. Magellanic rockcod feed have been recorded to eat the algae, amphiipos, the crab Halicarcinus planatus, the squat lobster Munida gregaria, copepods, isopods, hydrozoans, larval crustaceans and molluscs, including the bivalve Gaimardia trapesina. The Magellanic cod is the most abundant inshore fish in the waters off Marion Island and off Macquarie Island.

== Fisheries ==
Paranotothenia magellanica is caught as a foodfish.
