= CarA ncRNA motif =

carA
- Consensus secondary structure and sequence conservation of carA ncRNA motif

Identifiers
- Symbol: carA
- Rfam: RF04192

Other data
- RNA type: Cis-reg
- GO: GO:0010468
- SO: SO:0000370
- PDB structures: PDBe

The carA non-coding RNA (ncRNA) is an RNA motif proposed as a Strong Riboswitch Candidate (SRC). CarA ncRNA has been recognized by a comparative sequence analysis in GC-rich intergenic regions (IGR) of bacteria, using a pipeline call Discovery of Intergenic Motifs PipeLine (DIMPL). CarA ncRNA was located upstream of carA gene which codes for the small subunit of carbamoyl phosphate synthase, which is an enzyme that catalyzes the first committed step in pyrimidine and arginine biosynthesis. CarA ncRNA has been found in bacteria of the class beta proteobacteria, particularly in Polynucleobacter genus. Its proposed secondary structure consists of an extended imperfect hairpin that is immediately upstream of the predicted ribosome binding site (RBS) of the adjacent open reading frame (ORF) suggesting a possible cis-regulatory function where ligand binding regulates translation initiation. CarA ncRNA motif, was reported twice, carA was recognised in Polynucleobacter necessarius genome, and carA-2 in a genome of Beta proteobacterium CB.
