= Cryothenia =

Scientific classification
- Kingdom: Animalia
- Phylum: Chordata
- Class: Actinopterygii
- Order: Perciformes
- Family: Nototheniidae
- Genus: Cryothenia; Daniels, 1981

Type species
- Cryothenia peninsulae Daniels, 1981

Genus of fishes

Cryothenia is a genus of marine ray-finned fishes, belonging to the family Nototheniidae, the notothens or cod icefishes. They are native to the Southern Ocean.

== Taxonomy ==
Cryothenia was first formally described as a genus in 1981 by Robert A. Daniels when he was describing the new species Cryothenia peninsulae, which he designated as the type species as well as being the only species in the genus then known. Some authorities place this genus in the subfamily Trematominae, but the 5th edition of Fishes of the World does not include subfamilies in the Nototheniidae. The genus name is a compound of cryo, meaning "ice", and thenia, which means "coming from", that is an "icefish".

== Species ==
The recognized species in this genus are:

- Cryothenia amphitreta Cziko & C. H. C. Cheng, 2006
- Cryothenia peninsulae Daniels, 1981 (pithead)

== Characteristics ==
Cryothenia fishes have an elongate, fusiform body with a flattened head and a large mouth which has the lower jaw protruding and the maxilla extending beyond the front of the eye. The sensory canal on the head have large and obvious pores. There are no tubular scales in either of the two lateral lines, the upper lateral line consists of pored scales and follows the dorsal profile of the body from gill opening to underneath the rear part of the second dorsal fin. A middle lateral line also comprises pored scales and runs along the middle of the flanks from the pectoral fin to base of the caudal fin. Front part of the head does not have scales. They do not have any elongated fin spines or rays. The rounded caudal fin rounded contains 12 branched rays. The maximum recorded total length on this genus was the holotype of C. amphitreta which had a standard length of 261 mm (10.3 in).

== Distribution, habitat and biology ==
Cryothenia are found in the Southern Ocean, with C. peninsulae being found along the west coast Antarctic Peninsula and C. amphitreta only being recorded in the McMurdo Sound, C. peninsulae feed on krill and these fishes are regarded as pelagic or epibenthic. C. amphitreta was found to have blood which contained a high level of antifreeze proteins, but this has not been tested for C. peninsulae.
