= Icd-II ncRNA motif =

icd-II

Identifiers
- Symbol: icd-II
- Rfam: RF04189

Other data
- RNA type: Cis-reg
- GO: GO:0010468
- SO: SO:0000370
- PDB structures: PDBe

The icd-II non-coding RNA (ncRNA) is an RNA motif proposed as a Strong Riboswitch Candidate (SRC). Icd-II ncRNA has been recognized by a comparative sequence analysis in GC-rich intergenic regions (IGR) of bacteria, using a pipeline call Discovery of Intergenic Motifs PipeLine (DIMPL). Icd-II ncRNA has been located upstream of the icd gene, which codes for an NADP^{+}-dependent isocitrate dehydrogenase (IDH) enzyme. IDH is part of the citric acid cycle, and thus it participates in managing the carbon flux through this energy metabolism pathway. Icd-II ncRNA has been found in bacteria of the class beta proteobacteria, particularly in Polynucleobacter genus. Icd-II RNA secondary structure consists of a three-stem junction, where the ribosome binding site (RBS) of the adjacent open reading frame (ORF) is predicted to be involved in the first base-paired stem. It has been proposed that icd-II ncRNA can function as a riboswitch that regulates translation initiation of its associate ORF.
