= Cryothenia amphitreta =

Scientific classification
- Kingdom: Animalia
- Phylum: Chordata
- Class: Actinopterygii
- Order: Perciformes
- Family: Nototheniidae
- Genus: Cryothenia
- Species: C. amphitreta

Binomial name
- Cryothenia amphitreta Cziko & C. H. C. Cheng, 2006

Species of fish

Cryothenia amphitreta is a species of marine ray-finned fish, belonging to the family Nototheniidae, the notothens or cod icefishes. It is found in the Antarctic Ross Sea.

== Taxonomy ==
Cryothenia amphitreta was first formally described in 2006 by Paul A. Cziko and Chi-Hing "Christina" Cheng with the type locality given as the saltwater intake jetty of the McMurdo Station, located at 77°51.033'S, 166°39.759'W, on the eastern McMurdo Sound part of the Ross Sea off Antarctica. It was the second species to be classified within the genus Cryothenia. The specific name amphitreta means an orifice with two openings, an allusion to the morphology of the sensory pits between the eyes, being a feature that identifies C. amphitreta compared to C. peninsulae.

== Description ==
Cryothenia amphitreta is distinguished from C. peninsulae by the shorter pelvic fins which extend only as far as roughly halfway from the pelvic-fin base to origin of the anal fin, and the second dorsal fin being inserted to the front of the anal fin origin. It has large pores on the lateral lines of the head. The fourth pore of the supraorbital canal opens into a central, clearly defined, depressed pit between the eyes which is divided through its centre by a slightly raised ridge. The width of the concave interorbital area is greater than its length which does not extend further forward than the third supraorbital canal pore. The lining of the mouth, gill cavities, and peritoneum are black. The first dorsal fin has six spines, the second dorsal fin has 38 rays and the anal fin has 35 rays. The holotype had a standard length of261 mm (10.3 in) suggesting that this is a larger species than C. peninsulae. The living holotype was overall bronze-coloured with silver undertones and an obvious iridescence. There were a small number of vague darker blotches on the back and underneath the pectoral fin. The first dorsal fin is blackish while the caudal fin and pectoral fins are plain and dark. The remaining fins become blackish towards their margins and the anal fin has irregular dark blotches.

== Distribution, habitat and biology ==
Cryothenia amphitreta has only being recorded in the McMurdo Sound and it is regarded as likely to be pelagic or epibenthic. This species was found to have blood which contained a high level of antifreeze proteins, but this has not been tested for C. peninsulae.
