= Arthur DeVries =

American cryobiologist

- Education: B.S. University of Montana; Ph.D. Stanford University
- Scientific career
- Fields: Biology; Cryobiology
- Workplaces: University of California, Davis; University of California, San Diego; University of Illinois Urbana-Champaign

Arthur DeVries is an American cryobiologist whose research focuses on antifreeze glycoproteins found in the bodily fluids of fish. DeVries is noted for his discovery of antifreeze proteins within Antarctic notothenioids, such as toothfish and icefish.

== Education ==
DeVries received his B.S. in zoology in 1960 from the University of Montana, and later received his Ph.D. in biology from Stanford University in 1968 following his research on Antarctic notothenioids.

== Career and impact ==
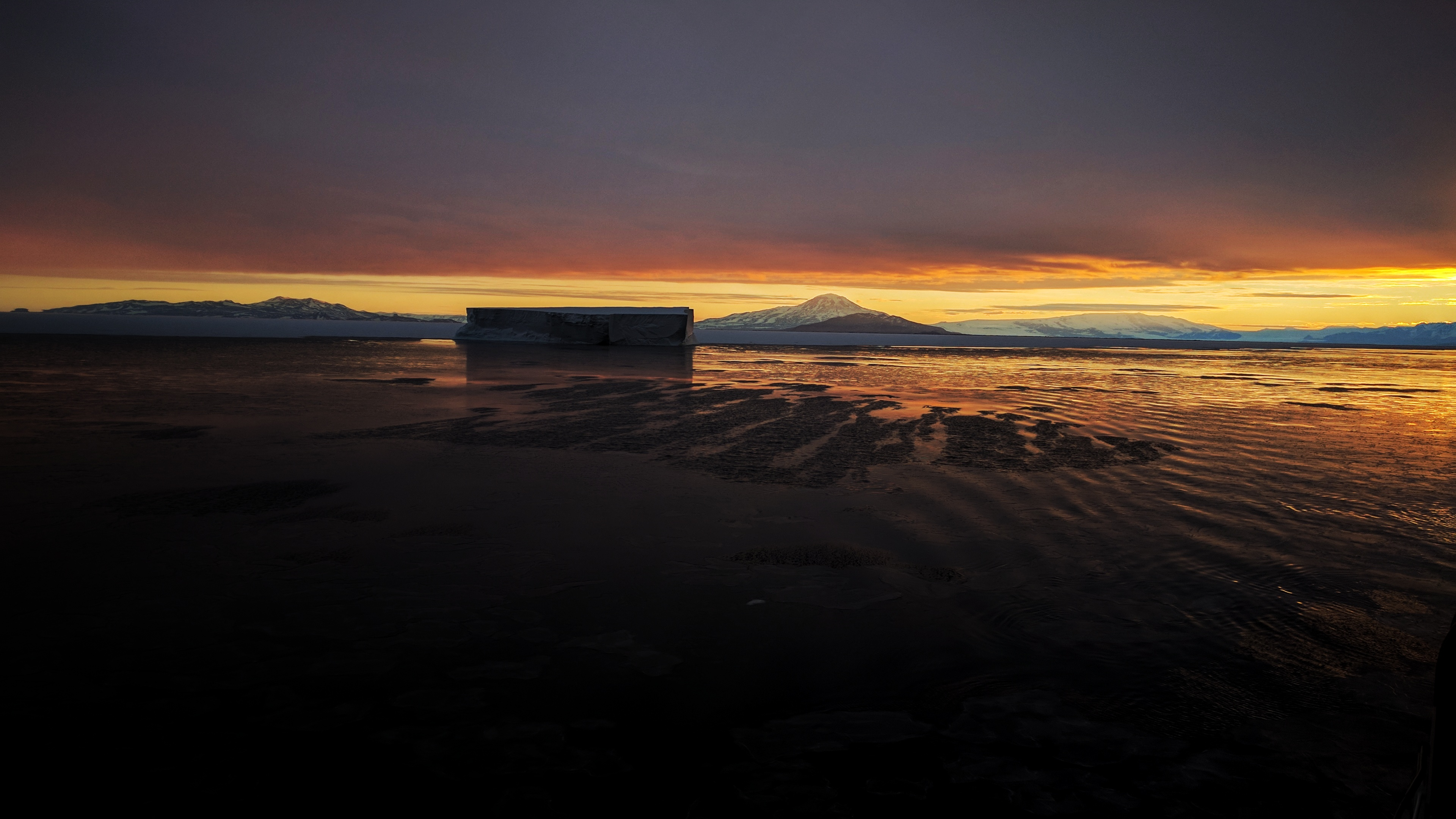
McMurdo Sound, Antarctica

In 1961, following his graduation from the University of Montana, DeVries spent thirteen months at McMurdo Station conducting research regarding the respiratory metabolism of notothenioid fishes within McMurdo Sound. While conducting this research, DeVries observed that some species of notothenioid fishes, such as icefish had the capacity to survive water temperatures of -1.9℃. DeVries' Ph.D. research thesis consisted of an investigation of this phenomenon, resulting in the discovery of antifreeze glycoproteins.

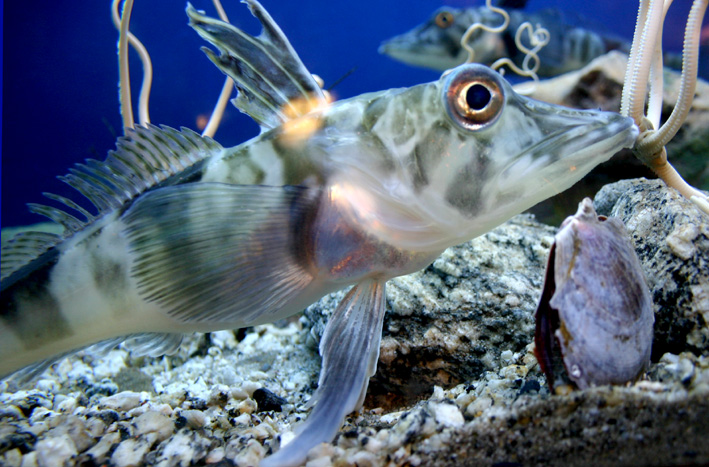
Chionodraco hamatus, a species of icefish found within Antarctica's continental shelf.

In 1997, in collaboration with his spouse and fellow biologist Chi-Hing "Christina" Cheng, DeVries researched the evolutionary history of the gene which results in the production of antifreeze proteins in Antarctic notothenioids. DeVries and Cheng found that a portion of DNA within a gene responsible for the production of a digestive enzyme was duplicated about fourteen million years ago, resulting in the production of an antifreeze protein rather than a digestive enzyme. In their research of the evolutionary history of antifreeze proteins, DeVries and Cheng found evidence of the convergent evolution of antifreeze proteins within Arctic cod, in which they observed a nearly identical antifreeze protein despite a lack of genetic similarity with Antarctic notothenioids.

DeVries has been affiliated with the University of California, San Diego and the University of California, Davis. DeVries is professor emeritus of Molecular & Integrative Physiology at the University of Illinois Urbana-Champaign following his retirement in 2011.

DeVries' discovery and research of antifreeze proteins in fish has facilitated the discovery of antifreeze proteins in other organisms, such as Arctic insects and Antarctic microorganisms. Further examination of the properties of antifreeze proteins by other researchers has resulted in the development of commercial and medical applications of fish antifreeze proteins, such as the preservation of cells during cryosurgery.

== Awards and honors ==
The American Association for the Advancement of Science named DeVries a Fellow of the American Association for the Advancement of Science in recognition of his discovery of antifreeze proteins. At the first Ice-Binding Protein Conference in 2011, DeVries was awarded the Lifetime Achievement Award. In 2014, DeVries was awarded an honorary Doctorate of Science degree from Roskilde University.

In 1980, the Antarctic fish Paraliparis devriesi was named after DeVries.

== Selected works ==
- DeVries, A. L., & Wohlschlag, D. E. (1969). Freezing Resistance in Some Antarctic Fishes. Science, 163(3871), 1073–1075. http://www.jstor.org/stable/1726105
- DeVries, A. L. (1971). Glycoproteins as Biological Antifreeze Agents in Antarctic Fishes. Science, 172(3988), 1152–1155. http://www.jstor.org/stable/1731864
- L. Chen, A.L. DeVries, & C.C. Cheng, Convergent evolution of antifreeze glycoproteins in Antarctic notothenioid fish and Arctic cod, Proc. Natl. Acad. Sci. U.S.A. 94 (8) 3817–3822, https://doi.org/10.1073/pnas.94.8.3817 (1997).
