= Chi-Hing "Christina" Cheng =

Biology researcher

- Education: Texas A&M University (B.S., 1977), University of Illinois at Urbana-Champaign (M.S., 1989), University of Illinois at Urbana-Champaign (Ph.D., 1989)
- Employer: University of Illinois at Urbana-Champaign
- Known for: Cryobiology, anti-freeze glycoproteins (AFGP), Evolution, Molecular Biology

Chi-Hing "Christina" Cheng is a professor at the University of Illinois Urbana-Champaign, under the Department of Evolution, Ecology, and Behavior. She is notable for her research focuses and expertise on the evolutionary origins of anti-freeze glycoproteins (AFGP) found in Antarctic notothenioids.

== Early life and education ==
In 1975, Cheng earned a bachelor's degree in zoology at Texas A&M University. In 1977, she earned her master's degree in Physiology and Biophysics the University of Illinois at Urbana-Champaign, and in 1989, she earned her Ph.D. in Molecular and Integrative Physiology, at the same university. She met her husband, Arthur DeVries, as a grad student working in a radiation biology lab, researching radiation's effects on flour beetle mortality, where he invited her to McMurdo Station to work as a field assistant. In 1984, during her first expedition to Antarctica, she extracted and purified AFGP, determined its protein sequence, and categorized various anti-freeze proteins from other fishes. Cheng taught herself how to clone and analyze genes using Polymerase Chain Reaction (PCR) to find the evolutionary origin of AFGP. Since then, she has been to the continent 19 times. Cheng also studied the effects of climate change on Antarctic Notothenioid populations by raising their body temperature.

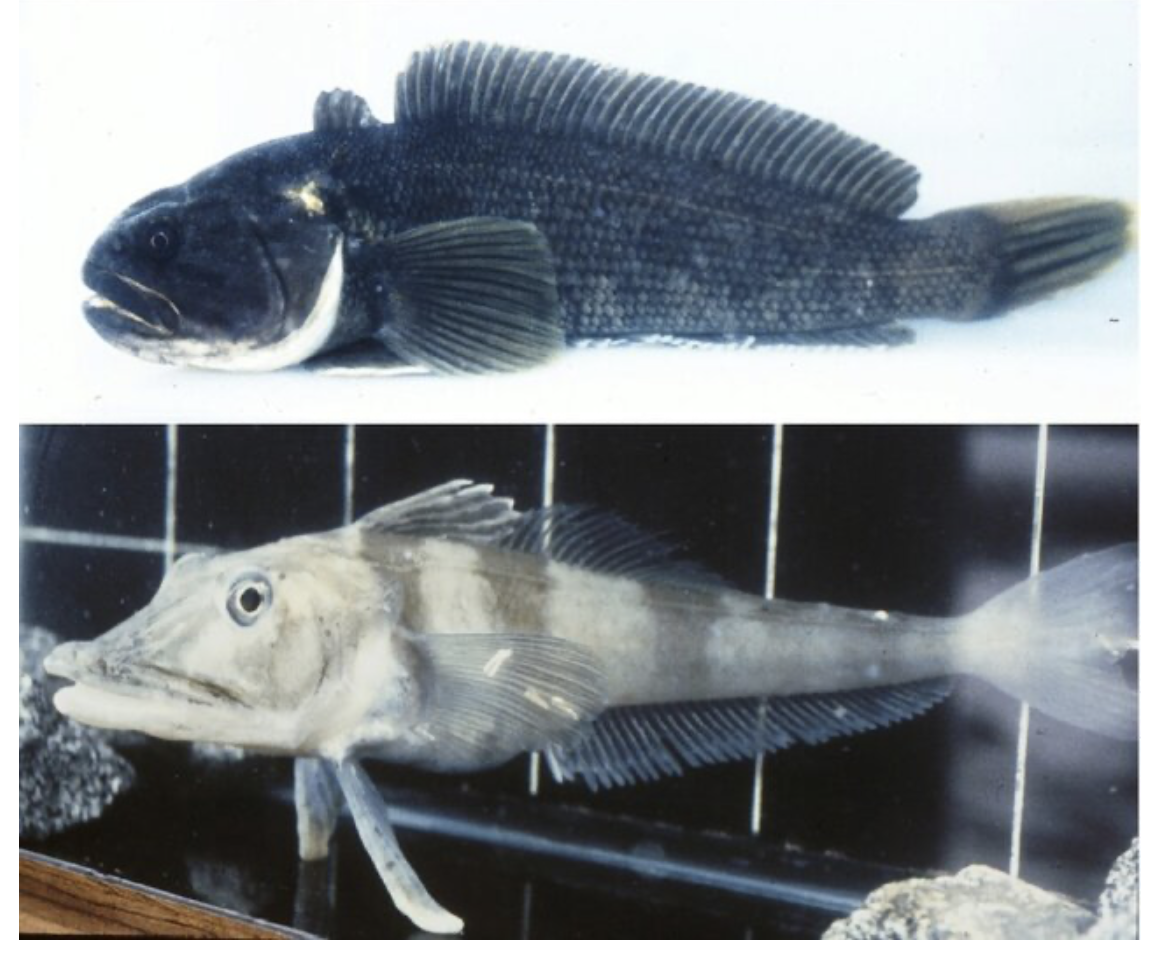
Representative Antarctic notothenioid fish (top). 90% of the fish biomass of the entire Southern Ocean is notothenioids. Photographs provided by H. William Detrich (Northeastern University, Boston).

== Career and impact ==
After two years of research, she discovered that AFGP is synthesized in the Antarctic Nototheioid's exocrine pancreas. Prior to her discovery, it was assumed AFGP was produced in the liver, the organ responsible for producing nearly all plasma proteins in vertebrates. With her husband, they discovered the evolutionary origins of AFGP: a mutation in a protease gene called trypsin. She estimated AFGP evolved seven to fifteen million years ago, during the mid-Miocene cooling, when the Southern Ocean started forming glaciers. Cheng also discovered that AFGP arose from trypsin through de novo gene evolution. This was the first discovered example of de novo gene evolution. To this day, school textbooks covering de novo genes use AFGP-production in Antarctic Notothenioid fish as their prime example. Cheng was the senior author in the discovery that AFGP inside Antarctic notothenioid fishes also prevents ice from melting, even in temperatures above its freezing point, a phenomenon called superheating. This finding may be the first example of ice superheating in nature.

In 2004,Cheng along with colleague Paul A. Cziko discovered and described a new species of fish, Cryothenia amphitreta, in McMurdo Sound, Antarctica. She was selected by the National Academies of Sciences Engineering and Medicine to serve on the committee developing the consensus report A Strategic Vision for NSF Investments in Antarctica and Southern Ocean Research which was published in 2015. In this report, Cheng successfully advocated for genomics as a priority initiative, arguing that it would reveal how climate change has affected organisms throughout the past and present. She currently serves as a member of the US National Academies Polar Research Board with tenure.

== Selected publications ==
1. Chen, Liangbiao; Devries, Arthur L.; Cheng, Chi Hing C. (1997-04-15). "Evolution of antifreeze glycoprotein gene from a trypsinogen gene in Antarctic notothenioid fish". Proceedings of the National Academy of Sciences of the United States of America. 94 (8): 3811–3816. doi:10.1073/pnas.94.8.3811. ISSN 0027-8424.
2. Chen, Liangbiao; Devries, Arthur L.; Cheng, Chi Hing C. (1997-04-15). "Convergent evolution of antifreeze glycoproteins in Antarctic notothenioid fish and Arctic cod". Proceedings of the National Academy of Sciences of the United States of America. 94 (8): 3817–3822. doi:10.1073/pnas.94.8.3817. ISSN 0027-8424.
3. Cziko, Paul A.; DeVries, Arthur L.; Evans, Clive W.; Christina Cheng, Chi Hing (2014-10-07). "Antifreeze protein-induced superheating of ice inside Antarctic notothenioid fishes inhibits melting during summer warming". Proceedings of the National Academy of Sciences of the United States of America. 111 (40): 14583–14588. doi:10.1073/pnas.1410256111. ISSN 0027-8424.
4. Cheng, Chi Hing C.; Cziko, Paul A.; Evans, Clive W. (2006-07-04). "Nonhepatic origin of notothenioid antifreeze reveals pancreatic synthesis as common mechanism in polar fish freezing avoidance". Proceedings of the National Academy of Sciences of the United States of America. 103 (27): 10491–10496. doi:10.1073/pnas.0603796103. ISSN 0027-8424.
5. Cheng, Chi Hing C.; Chen, Liangbiao; Near, Thomas J.; Jin, Yumi (2003–11). "Functional Antifreeze Glycoprotein Genes in Temperate-Water New Zealand Nototheniid Fish Infer an Antarctic Evolutionary Origin". Molecular biology and evolution. 20 (11): 1897–1908. doi:10.1093/molbev/msg208. ISSN 0737-4038.
