= Intergenic region =

In genetics, a stretch of DNA sequences located between genes

An intergenic region is a stretch of DNA sequences located between genes. Intergenic regions may contain functional elements and junk DNA.

== Properties and functions ==
Intergenic regions may contain a number of functional DNA sequences such as promoters and regulatory elements, enhancers, spacers, and (in eukaryotes) centromeres. They may also contain origins of replication, scaffold attachment regions, and transposons and viruses.

Non-functional DNA elements such as pseudogenes and repetitive DNA, both of which are types of junk DNA, can also be found in intergenic regions—although they may also be located within genes in introns. It is possible that these regions contain as of yet unidentified functional elements, such as non-coding genes or regulatory sequences. This indeed occurs occasionally, but the amount of functional DNA discovered usually constitute only a tiny fraction of the overall amount of intergenic or intronic DNA.

== Intergenic regions in different organisms ==
In humans, intergenic regions comprise about 50% of the genome, whereas this number is much less in bacteria (15%) and yeast (30%).

As with most other non-coding DNA, the GC-content of intergenic regions vary considerably among species. For example in Plasmodium falciparum, many intergenic regions have an AT content of 90%.

== Molecular evolution of intergenic regions ==
Functional elements in intergenic regions will evolve slowly because their sequence is maintained by negative selection. In species with very large genomes, a large percentage of intergenic regions is probably junk DNA and it will evolve at the neutral rate of evolution. Junk DNA sequences are not maintained by purifying selection but gain-of-function mutations with deleterious fitness effects can occur.

Phylostratigraphic inference and bioinformatics methods have shown that intergenic regions can—on geological timescales—transiently evolve into open reading frame sequences that mimic those of protein coding genes, and can therefore lead to the evolution of novel protein-coding genes in a process known as de novo gene birth.

== See also ==
- Exon
- Promoter (biology)
- ENCODE
- Heterochromatin
- Noncoding DNA
- Repetitive DNA
- Regulator gene
- Whole genome sequencing
