= Phylostratum =

Phylostratum is a set of genes from an organism that coalesce to founder genes having common phylogenetic origin. This term was coined by Domazet and Tautz to describe the gene origination.
